= Rita Lee albums discography =

Albums by Brazilian singer

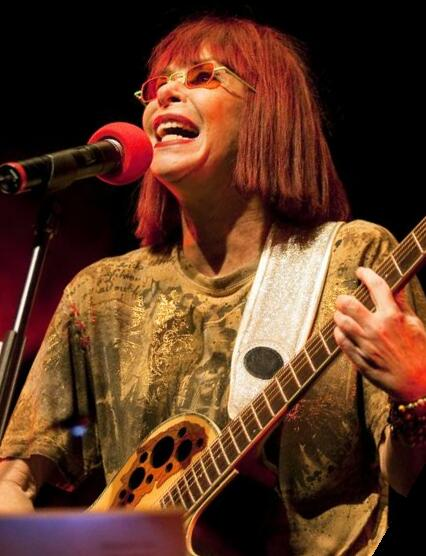
- Lee in 2010
- Studio albums: 22
- Live albums: 7
- Compilation albums: 7
- Spoken word albums: 2
- Other releases: 25

Brazilian singer-songwriter Rita Lee (31 December 1947 – 8 May 2023) released 22 studio albums, seven live albums, seven compilation albums, two spoken word albums, 32 singles, 29 promotional singles, and 25 other releases. With over 55 million units sold worldwide, Lee is the most successful Brazilian female artist of all time in record sales.

In 1970, she began her solo career by signing with Polydor Records. Her first release under the label was her debut album, Build Up (1970), recorded jointly with the Tropicália band Os Mutantes. This partnership was repeated on her following record, Hoje É o Primeiro Dia do Resto da Sua Vida (1972). Her subsequent release, Atrás do Porto Tem uma Cidade (1974)—issued in conjunction with the group Tutti Frutti through PolyGram—sold a modest 9,000 copies. Lee's fourth studio album and her first under Som Livre, Fruto Proibido (1975), peaked at number seven on the IBOPE albums chart and sold 700,000 copies. It became the best-selling album by a female artist in Brazil that year and was the first Brazilian rock release to achieve high sales, helping to popularize the genre in the country. She followed this with her fifth and sixth studio albums, Entradas e Bandeiras (1976) and Babilônia (1978), which sold 90,000 and 150,000 copies respectively during their first years of release; the latter reached number five on the IBOPE chart and marked her final project with Tutti Frutti.

In the late 1970s, Lee established a prolific songwriting and stage partnership with her husband, composer and guitarist Roberto de Carvalho. The duo's first release, Rita Lee (1979), sold 800,000 copies. Their following project, also titled Rita Lee (1980), achieved widespread commercial success; it reached the top 10 on the charts in France, Belgium, Switzerland, and Argentina, and peaked at number one in Brazil, where it sold over one million copies. Eight subsequent records resulted from this partnership: Saúde (1981); Rita Lee & Roberto de Carvalho (1982), which sold two million units and became one of the best-selling Brazilian albums of all time; Baila Conmigo (1983); Bombom (1983); and Rita e Roberto (1985), which concluded her contract with Som Livre. Flerte Fatal (1987), Zona Zen (1988), and Rita Lee & Roberto de Carvalho (1990) were released through EMI. The latter two achieved less commercial prominence, signaling the decline and eventual end of the credited partnership.

During the 1990s, Lee released only two studio albums, Rita Lee (1993, through Som Livre) and Santa Rita de Sampa (1997, through Universal Music), both of which generated little popular appeal. However, the decade stood out for her live releases: Bossa 'n Roll (1991), A Marca da Zorra (1995), and Acústico MTV (1998), which sold 650,000 copies across CD and DVD formats. Lee entered the 2000s with 3001 (2000), which garnered excellent critical reception and won the Latin Grammy Award for Best Brazilian Rock Album, marking her first victory at the ceremony. Her subsequent work, Bossa 'n Beatles (2001), issued by Deckdisc, was highly successful in Argentina, reaching number two and receiving a platinum certification from CAPIF, alongside selling 250,000 copies within a few months. Lee's penultimate album of original material, Balacobaco (2003), marked her return to Som Livre; it sold 550,000 copies, reached number eight on the IstoÉ albums chart, and peaked at number 17 in Portugal. During the promotional tour for this record, she released MTV ao Vivo (2004), which was followed by another live recording, Multishow ao Vivo, in 2009. Her final studio album, Reza, was released in 2012 by Biscoito Fino.

== Studio albums ==
Title	Album details	Peak chart positions							Sales	Certifications (Note: Not all certifications in Brazil were awarded exclusively by Pro-Música Brasil (PMB). In the 1980s, for example, the organization awarded only one gold or platinum record per release, whereas some of Lee's albums from that period hold double platinum certifications.)
Title	Album details	BRA	POR	ARG	URU	FRA	BEL	SWI	Sales	Certifications
Build Up	Released: 1970; Label: Polydor; Formats: LP; CD	—	—	—	—	—	—	—		
Hoje É o Primeiro Dia do Resto da Sua Vida	Released: September 1972; Label: Polydor; Formats: LP; CD	—	—	—	—	—	—	—	BRA: 1,000	
Atrás do Porto Tem uma Cidade	Released: June 1974; Label: PolyGram; Formats: Cassette; LP; CD	—	—	—	—	—	—	—	BRA: 9,000	
Fruto Proibido	Released: 30 June 1975; Label: Som Livre; Formats: Cassette; LP; CD	7	—	—	—	—	—	—	BRA: 700,000 (Note: Estimated sales of Fruto Proibido in Brazil as of December 2015.)	
Entradas e Bandeiras	Released: July 1976; Label: Som Livre; Formats: Cassette; LP; CD	—	—	—	—	—	—	—	BRA: 90,000 (Note: Sales of Entradas e Bandeiras in Brazil in the first full year after release.)	
Babilônia	Released: April 1978; Label: Som Livre; Formats: Cassette; LP; CD	5	—	—	—	—	—	—	BRA: 150,000 (Note: Sales of Babilônia in Brazil in the first full year after release.)	
Rita Lee (Mania de Você)	Released: August 1979; Label: Som Livre; Formats: Cassette; LP; CD	—	—	—	—	—	—	—	BRA: 800,000 (Note: Estimated sales of Mania de Você in Brazil as of May 2023.)	PMB: 2× Platinum
Rita Lee (Lança Perfume)	Released: 25 September 1980; Label: Som Livre; Formats: Cassette; LP; CD	1	—	7	—	10	10	10	BRA: 1,000,000 (Note: Estimated sales of Lança Perfume in Brazil as of October 2020.); FRA: 60,000 (Note: Sales of Lança Perfume in France as of March 1982.); ARG: 30,000 (Note: Sales of Lança Perfume in Argentina as of April 1981.)	PMB: 2× Platinum
Saúde	Released: 4 November 1981; Label: Som Livre; Formats: Cassette; LP; CD	—	4	—	14	—	—	—	BRA: 430,000 (Note: Sales of Saúde in Brazil as of October 1982.)	PMB: Platinum
Rita Lee & Roberto de Carvalho (Flagra)	Released: November 1982; Label: Som Livre; Formats: Cassette; LP; CD	—	—	—	—	—	—	—	BRA: 2,000,000 (Note: Estimated sales of Flagra in Brazil as of July 2016.)	PMB: 2× Platinum; GPPFV: Silver
Baila Conmigo	Released: April 1983; Label: EMI; Formats: Cassette; LP	—	—	8	—	—	—	—	MEX: 80,000 (Note: Sales of Baila Conmigo in Mexico as of May 1983.)	
Bombom	Released: November 1983; Label: Som Livre; Formats: Cassette; LP; CD	—	—	—	—	—	—	—		PMB: 2× Platinum
Rita e Roberto	Released: 7 September 1985; Label: Som Livre; Formats: Cassette; LP; CD	10	—	—	—	—	—	—	BRA: 500,000 (Note: Estimated sales of Rita e Roberto in Brazil as of November 2020.)	PMB: Gold
Flerte Fatal	Released: 12 May 1987; Label: EMI; Formats: Cassette; LP; CD	5	—	—	—	—	—	—	BRA: 500,000 (Note: Estimated sales of Flerte Fatal in Brazil as of April 2023.)	PMB: Platinum
Zona Zen	Released: 5 December 1988; Label: EMI; Formats: Cassette; LP; CD	—	—	—	—	—	—	—	BRA: 130,000 (Note: Number of copies of Zona Zen shipped to stores in the pre-release period.)	PMB: Gold
Rita Lee & Roberto de Carvalho (Perto do Fogo)	Released: November 1990; Label: EMI; Formats: Cassette; LP; CD	—	—	—	—	—	—	—	BRA: 100,000 (Note: Number of copies of Perto do Fogo shipped to stores in the pre-release period.)	AFP: Silver
Rita Lee (Todas as Mulheres do Mundo)	Released: 26 July 1993; Label: Som Livre; Formats: Cassette; LP; CD	—	—	—	—	—	—	—		
Santa Rita de Sampa	Released: 4 September 1997; Label: Universal Music; Formats: Cassette; LP; CD	38	—	—	—	—	—	—		PMB: Gold
3001	Released: 17 July 2000; Label: Universal Music; Formats: Cassette; LP; CD	—	—	—	—	—	—	—	BRA: 300,000 (Note: Number of copies of 3001 shipped to stores in the pre-release period.)	PMB: Gold
Bossa 'n Beatles (Aqui, Ali, em Qualquer Lugar)	Released: October 2001; Label: Deckdisc; Formats: LP; CD	—	—	2	—	—	—	—	BRA: 250,000 (Note: Sales of Bossa 'n Beatles in Brazil as of February 2002.)	CAPIF: Platinum; PMB: Gold
Balacobaco	Released: 27 October 2003; Label: Som Livre; Formats: LP; CD	8	17	—	—	—	—	—	BRA: 550,000 (Note: Sales of Balacobaco in Brazil as of February 2012.); POR: 9,000 (Note: Sales of Balacobaco in Portugal as of February 2009.)	PMB: Platinum
Reza	Released: 30 April 2012; Label: Biscoito Fino; Formats: LP; CD; digital download	—	—	—	—	—	—	—		
"—" denotes items that were not released in that territory or have no available records for a specific chart.

== Live albums ==
Title	Album details	Peak chart positions	Sales	Certifications
Title	Album details	BRA	Sales	Certifications
Refestança (with Gilberto Gil and Tutti Frutti)	Released: November 1977; Label: Som Livre; Formats: Cassette; LP; CD	—	BRA: 200,000 (Note: Estimated sales of Refestança in Brazil as of January 2012.)	
Rita Lee em Bossa 'n Roll	Released: August 1991; Label: Som Livre; Formats: Cassette; LP; CD	5	BRA: 400,000 (Note: Sales of Rita Lee em Bossa 'n Roll in Brazil in the first full year after release.)	
A Marca da Zorra	Released: 1995; Label: Som Livre; Formats: Cassette; LP; CD	—		
Acústico MTV: Rita Lee	Released: 3 September 1998; Label: Universal Music; Formats: Cassette; LP; CD+VHS; DVD	4	BRA: 650,000 (Note: Sales of Acústico MTV: Rita Lee in Brazil as of July 2000.)	PMB: Platinum (CD) + Platinum (DVD)
MTV ao Vivo: Rita Lee	Released: 6 December 2004; Label: EMI; Formats: LP; CD+DVD	—		PMB: Gold (CD) + Gold (DVD)
Multishow ao Vivo: Rita Lee	Released: 22 May 2009; Label: Biscoito Fino; Formats: CD+DVD; digital download	—		
Uma Noite no Luna Park (ao Vivo)	Released: 31 October 2024; Label: Universal Music; Formats: LP; streaming; digital download	—		
"—" denotes items that were not released in that territory or have no available records for a specific chart.

== Compilation albums ==
Title	Album details	Notes
O Melhor de Rita Lee	Released: 1976; Label: Fontana; Formats: LP	A 12-track compilation released in Brazil in 1976, including the previously unreleased song "E Você Ainda Duvida? / Tutti Frutti".
Os Grandes Sucessos de Ritta Lee	Released: 1981; Label: Fontana; Formats: Cassette; LP	A 14-track compilation released in Brazil in 1981 and in France in 1982, including the previously unreleased tracks "Nessas Alturas dos Acontecimentos" and "Paixão da Minha Existência Atribulada".
Rita Hits	Released: 1984; Label: Som Livre; Formats: Cassette; LP	
Rita ReLEEda	Released: 2000; Label: EMI; Formats: LP; CD	
Rita Lee & Roberto - Classix Remix Vol. I	Released: 9 April 2021; Label: Universal Music; Formats: Streaming; digital download	
Rita Lee & Roberto - Classix Remix Vol. II	Released: 14 May 2021; Label: Universal Music; Formats: Streaming; digital download	
Rita Lee & Roberto - Classix Remix Vol. III	Released: 25 June 2021; Label: Universal Music; Formats: Streaming; digital download	

== Spoken word albums ==
Title	Album details	Notes
Pedro e o Lobo	Released: 1989; Label: EMI; Formats: LP; CD	A narration of the story Peter and the Wolf in collaboration with Roberto Tibiriçá and the Orquestra Nova Sinfonieta.
Tutu, o Menino Índio	Released: 1996; Label: Velas; Formats: CD	A narration of the story Tutu, o Menino Índio by Toni Brandão, shared with Gerson de Abreu, Marisa Orth, Vânia Bastos, André Abujamra, Felipe Gaudêncio, Ulisses Cohen, and Lígia Cortez.

== Other releases ==
The following albums were only released in limited availability (certain territories or formats); do not contain any unreleased material or new recordings; and are not part of Lee's core discography.
Title	Album details	Peak chart positions	Certifications	Notes
Title	Album details	POR	Certifications	Notes
Rita Lee	Type: Promotional EP; Released: 1979; Label: Som Livre; Formats: 7"	—		A four-track EP containing tracks from the album Mania de Você, including the title track, "Corre-Corre", "Chega Mais", and "Maria Mole".
Gala Apresenta: O Melhor de Rita Lee	Type: Compilation album; Released: 1979; Label: Gala; Formats: LP	—		
Rita Lee	Type: Promotional EP; Released: 1981; Label: Som Livre; Formats: 7"	—		A four-track EP containing tracks from the album Lança Perfume, including the title track, "Baila Comigo", "Nem Luxo, Nem Lixo", and "Caso Sério".
Saúde	Type: Promotional EP; Released: 1982; Label: Som Livre; Formats: 7"	—		A four-track EP containing tracks from the album Saúde, including "Banho de Espuma", "Atlântida", "Mutante", and "Favorita".
Baila Brazil	Type: Compilation album; Released: 1983; Label: EMI; Formats: LP	—		An 11-track compilation released in Italy in 1983 featuring the same cover artwork as Baila Conmigo. The release occurred after Lee performed on the RAI program Te lo do io il Brasile.
O Brilho do Encontro	Released: 1983; Label: RGE; Formats: LP	—		A 14-track compilation of songs by Rita Lee and Erasmo Carlos released in Brazil in 1983, featuring a duet between the two for the song "Minha Fama de Mau".
Rita Lee: Tratos à Bola	Type: Compilation album; Released: 1986; Label: Philips; Formats: Cassette; LP	—		
Grandes Sucessos de Rita Lee & Roberto	Type: Compilation album; Released: 1988; Label: Som Livre; Formats: Cassette; LP	—		
Rita Lee: Lança Perfume e Outras Manias	Type: Compilation album; Released: 1992; Label: EMI; Formats: LP; CD	—	PMB: Gold	
Meus Momentos	Type: Compilation album; Released: 1994; Label: EMI; Formats: CD	—	PMB: Platinum	
Performance: Rita Lee	Type: Compilation album; Released: 1996; Label: EMI; Formats: CD	—		
Meus Momentos (Volume 2)	Type: Compilation album; Released: 1997; Label: EMI; Formats: CD	—		A 14-track compilation released in Brazil in 1997, with the majority of tracks considered rarities as they are not present on any album in Lee's official discography.
MPB Compositores: Rita Lee	Type: Compilation album; Released: 1997; Label: SGE; Formats: CD	—		
Os Grandes da MPB: Rita Lee	Type: Compilation album; Released: 1997; Label: Gala; Formats: CD	—		
Para Sempre	Type: Compilation album; Released: 2001; Label: EMI; Formats: CD	—		
Novelas	Type: Compilation album; Released: 2002; Label: Som Livre; Formats: CD	—		A 16-track compilation released in Brazil in 2002 containing songs featured on telenovela soundtracks, including the pop version of "Minha Vida (In My Life)".
Rita Lee Hits Volume I	Type: Compilation album; Released: 2005; Label: EMI; Formats: CD	—		
O Melhor de Rita Lee	Type: Compilation album; Released: 19 September 2005; Label: EMI; Formats: CD	2	AFP: Platinum	A Portugal-only 17-track compilation released in 2005.
Perfil	Type: Compilation album; Released: 2007; Label: Som Livre; Formats: CD	—		
Três Tons de Rita Lee	Type: Box set; Released: 2013; Label: Universal Music; Formats: 3×CD	—		A Brazil-only 3-disc box set containing Build Up, Hoje É o Primeiro Dia do Resto da Sua Vida, and Atrás do Porto Tem uma Cidade.
Discografia	Type: Box set; Released: 2015; Label: Universal Music; Formats: 21×CD	—		A Brazil-only 21-disc box set containing 20 remastered CDs and one CD of rare songs by the singer: Build Up, Hoje É o Primeiro Dia do Resto da Sua Vida, Atrás do Porto Tem uma Cidade, Fruto Proibido, Entradas e Bandeiras, Babilônia, Mania de Você, Lança Perfume, Saúde, Flagra, Bombom, Rita e Roberto, Flerte Fatal, Zona Zen, Perto do Fogo, Santa Rita de Sampa, Acústico MTV: Rita Lee, 3001, MTV ao Vivo, and Pérolas.
Feliz que Está Tudo Blue	Type: Compilation album; Released: 28 June 2024; Label: Universal Music; Formats: Streaming; digital download	—		
Tudo Blue em 2024	Type: Compilation album; Released: 17 December 2024; Label: Universal Music; Formats: Streaming; digital download	—		
Chega Mais com Rita Lee	Type: Compilation album; Released: 11 March 2025; Label: Universal Music; Formats: Streaming; digital download	—		
Fruto Proibido	Type: Box set; Released: 18 December 2025; Label: Universal Music; Formats: LP+7"	—		A Brazil-exclusive set released for the 50th anniversary of Fruto Proibido containing the album on LP and the Rita Lee & Tutti Frutti double EP originally released in 1976, which includes "Lá Vou Eu", "Caçador de Aventuras", "Status", and a radio edit of "Ovelha Negra".

== See also ==
- Rita Lee singles discography
- List of best-selling albums in Brazil
