= Lança Perfume =

1980 single by Rita Lee

Single by Rita Lee

from the album Rita Lee
- B-side: "Lança Perfume (instrumental)"
- Released: 1980
- Recorded: 1980
- Studio: Sigla, Rio de Janeiro
- Genre: Disco
- Length: 5:15
- Label: Barclay
- Songwriters: Rita Lee; Roberto de Carvalho
- Producer: Guto Graça Mello

Rita Lee singles chronology
"Arrombou a Festa" (1976)	"Lança Perfume" (1980)	"Tatibitati" (1982)

"Lança Perfume" is a song by Rita Lee, released in 1980 from her self-titled album, written by Lee and her husband Roberto de Carvalho.

Despite being banned in her native Brazil by the Divisão de Censura de Diversões Públicas, the song was a top 3 hit in São Paulo. It was also an international hit in several countries.

== Composition ==
In an interview with Papo com Clê, Roberto de Carvalho explained on how the song was written, "I did it on the piano. I remember I was on the piano in the dining room, and my father was there listening. Rita hadn't written the lyrics yet, but she wrote the melody. Once I finished writing the song, my father said this song is going to be a hit.

In an interview with GNZ News, Lee explained that the song's title was inspired by her childhood, where everytime the SC Corinthians Paulista won a tournament, her father Charles distributed inhalable perfume throwers to the entire family. The song is otherwise an ode to her love for Carvalho, including racy lyrics like "Put me in all fours, fill me with love". The introduction of the track came about after Carvalho and Lincoln Olivetti presented two introductions. Eventually, Guto Graça Mello, the album's producer, chose to use both.

In 2020, Rita told Veja magazine that she barely had any memory recording the song, but remembers the ambience in the studio at that time.

== Release and reception ==
Upon the song's release, "Lança Perfume" was banned by the Divisão de Censura de Diversões Públicas because of the title being named after an inhalant drug. This didn't stop the song from reaching the top 3 in her native Brazil.

It was also a hit in France, where it peaked at number one. It was released in the United States in July 1981 and was a minor hit in the disco chart, peaking at No. 70. The song sold more than 200,000 copies in France and 800,000 copies worldwide.

It is one of Charles III's favorite songs.

== Awards ==
Year	Award	Category	Result
1980	Troféu Imprensa	Best Song	Won

== Charts ==
=== Weekly charts ===
Chart (1981)	Peak position
Argentina (CAPIF)	2
France (SNEP)	1
Germany (BVMI)	3
São Paulo (Rádio América)	3
Spain (PROMUSICAE)	27
Uruguay (CUD)	3
US Disco Top 80 (Billboard)	70

=== Decade-end charts ===
Chart (1980–1989)	Position
Brazil (Pro-Música Brasil)	76
