= Rita ReLEEda =

Remix album by Rita Lee
- Released: 2000
- Recorded: 1970–1980
- Genre: Pop rock, MPB
- Label: EMI

Rita Lee chronology
3001 (2000)	Rita ReLEEda (2000)	Aqui, Ali, Em Qualquer Lugar (2001)

Rita ReLEEda is a remix album, by Brazilian rock singer Rita Lee, It was released in 2000.

== Track listing ==
1. "Saúde" (Alessandro Tausz)
2. "Mania De Você" (Meme)
3. "Banho De Espuma" (Meme & Nino Carlo)
4. "Doce Vampiro" (Dl Mau Mau & M4j)
5. "Nem Luxo Nem Lixo" (Bossacucanova)
6. "On The Rocks" (Kid Abelha)
7. "Tatibitati" (Alessandro Tausz)
8. "Baila Comigo" (Rodrigo Kuster and Fabio Tabach)
9. "Bem Me Quer" (Paulo Jeveaux)
10. "Mutante" (Apollo 9)
11. "Caso Sério" (Dj Marky and Ricardo Pinda)
12. "Atlântida" (Embrio)
13. "Brasyx Muamba" (Embrio)
14. "Lança Perfume" (Ricardo Pinda and Dudu Marote)
15. "Lança Perfume" (Meme)
16. "Lança Perfume" (Dudu Marote)
