= List of best-selling music artists in Brazil =

The following is a list of the best-selling music artists in Brazil, and the best-selling Brazilian artists worldwide. Most figures are provided by Pro-Música Brasil.

== Best-selling Brazilian artists worldwide ==
A list of the best-selling Brazilian artists, with over 40 million on claimed sales.

Artists	Period active	Genre	Sales
Roberto Carlos	1951–present	MPB; rock	120,000,000
Nelson Gonçalves	1941–1998	Samba	78,000,000
Angela Maria	1948–2018	MPB; samba	60,000,000
Rita Lee	1963–2023	Rock; MPB	55,000,000
Tonico & Tinoco	1930–1994	Sertanejo	50,000,000
Xuxa	1984–present	Pop; children's music	45,000,000
Benito di Paula	1966–present	Samba	45,000,000
Nelson Ned	1960–2014	Brega	45,000,000
Raça Negra	1983–present	Pagode	40,000,000
Chitãozinho & Xororó	1970–present	Sertanejo	40,000,000

== Best-selling foreign music artists in Brazil ==
A list of the best-selling international acts in Brazil with record certifications or sales up to 2 million copies.

*Updated as of June 28, 2026

Artists	Country	Period active	Genre	Certified units/sales
Julio Iglesias	Spain	1968–present	Latin pop	15,000,000 (Note: Julio Iglesias has 1,575,000 certified units by Pro-Música Brasil, as of April 2024. Up to 2000, he sold an estimated 15 million record sales in the country, according to Folha de São Paulo.)
Rihanna	Barbados	2003–present	Pop; Country; R&B	14,730,000
Ariana Grande	United States	2008–present	Pop; R&B	12,850,000
Taylor Swift	United States	2006–present	Pop; Country; Folk	12,330,000
Lady Gaga	United States	2008–present	Pop; Dance; Electronic; Jazz	11,650,000
Billie Eilish	United States	2015–present	Pop; alternative pop; electropop; indie pop	10,380,000
Beyoncé	United States	1997–present	R&B; Pop; Hip-Hop	8,790,000
Katy Perry	United States	2008–present	Pop; Rock; Disco	8,455,000
Adele	United Kingdom	2006–present	Pop; Soul	6,610,000
Shakira	Colombia	2005–present	Latin; Pop; Dance; Rock	6,125,000
Calvin Harris	Scotland	2002–present	EDM	5,790,000
Doja Cat	United States	2012–present	Hip-Hop; Pop; R&B	5,320,000
Michael Jackson	United States	1971–2009	Pop	4,340,000 (Note: According to reports by some Brazilian media outlets, Michael Jackson has sold more than 4 million copies of 6 albums alone up to 2008. The current total of over 4.34 million corresponds to his certified works (Love Never Felt So Good with 180,000 units, 30,000 copies of Thriller 25, and 50,000 copies of History on Film, Volume II) at the Pro-Música Brasil's database.)
Olivia Rodrigo	United States	2015–present	Pop; rock; folk	4,220,000
Madonna	United States	1982–present	Pop	4,200,000 (Note: According to reports by some Brazilian media outlets, including Jornal do Brasil, Madonna sold 3,7 million sales of 9 albums alone up to 1993. The current over 4.2 million corresponds to her certified works (singles and albums) at the Pro-Música Brasil's database.)
Dua Lipa	United Kingdom	2014–present	Pop; disco; house	4,000,000
U2	Ireland	1976–present	Rock	2,675,000
Sabrina Carpenter	United States	2008–present	Pop; Dance; R&B	2,510,000

== See also ==
- List of best-selling singles in Brazil
- List of best-selling albums by country
