= Rita Lee (1980 album) =

Studio album by Rita Lee
- Released: 25 September 1980
- Recorded: 1980
- Venue: São Paulo
- Genres: Pop rock, disco
- Length: 36:07
- Label: Som Livre
- Producers: Guto Graça Mello, Roberto de Carvalho

Rita Lee chronology
Rita Lee (1979)	Rita Lee (1980)	Saúde (1981)

Singles from Rita Lee
- 1. "Lança-perfume" Released: 1980

Rita Lee is the fourth solo album by Rita Lee, released in 1980.

A continuation of her self-titled album released the previous year, Rita Lee gained international success through her single "Lança-perfume". It sold a million copies in her native Brazil.

== Track listing ==
All tracks are written by Rita Lee and Roberto de Carvalho, except where noted.

Side A
No.	Title	Writer(s)	Length
1.	"Lança-perfume"		5:15
2.	"Bem-me-quer"		4:19
3.	"Baila comigo"	Rita Lee	5:30
4.	"Shangrilá"		2:53

Side B
No.	Title	Writer(s)	Length
5.	"Caso sério"		5:31
6.	"Nem luxo nem lixo"		5:05
7.	"João Ninguém"		3:38
8.	"Ôrra meu"	Rita Lee	3:56

== Charts ==
=== Weekly charts ===
Chart (1981)	Peak position
Argentine Albums (CAPIF)	7
Belgian Albums (Ultratop)	10
Brazilian Albums (Pro-Música Brasil)	1
French Albums (SNEP)	10
Swiss Albums (Swiss Hitparade)	10

=== Year-end charts ===
Chart (1981)	Position
Brazilian Top 50 LPs, Cassettes, and CDs (NOPEM)	7

== Certifications and sales ==
Certifications for Lança Perfume
Region	Certification	Certified units/sales
Argentina	—	30,000
Brazil (Pro-Música Brasil)	2× Platinum	1,000,000
France	—	60,000
