= Rock in São Paulo =

Rock entered the São Paulo state music scene in the 1950s, at the same time as in the Brazilian music scene. It had its best moment in the 1980s.

== 1950s and 1960s ==
In the beginning few singers recorded rock songs, but they are not considered rock singers. In 1958 Tony Campello recorded a single and released his álbum in 1959 at the same time that his sister Celly Campello released her single called Estúpido Cupido that was a great success with one hundred and twenty thousand copies. It was also made a doll of Celly because of her great talent and charisma.
Among other groups we had Os Incríveis that released “Era um Garoto Que Como Eu Amava os Beatles e os Rolling Stones” and Jerry Adriani who was a singer and a TV presenter.
In the late sixties we had Os Mutantes with its psychedelic rock formed by Arnaldo Baptista, Rita Lee and Sérgio Dias, the first show was at the Ronnie Von program at TV Record, the same where the Campellos also had a TV Music Show.

== 1970s ==
In the 1970s there was less support from TV and media for rock. There was time of dictatorship and police repression. Os Mutantes continues until 1978 even with the departure of Rita Lee for a solo career with the band Tutti Frutti. In 1976 she met Roberto de Carvalho who would become her husband and music partner, but without the Tutti Frutti band.
We had also Secos & Molhados that released their first album in 1973 and appeared at Fantastico TV show at Rede Globo. The album sold over a million copies. The group split up in 1974 after a new album.
Other groups from the decade were Made in Brazil, Som Nosso de Cada Dia, Joelho de Porco, Casa das Máquinas and Moto Perpétuo. In the end of the decade in the North Area of the capital and the ABC area, it appears the punks. Young people started to listen to punk music records from Europe and USA and soon they started to make their own songs. We had the groups Restos de Nada, AI-5, Cólera and Condutores de Cadáver.

== 1980s ==
Many bands and rock singers started not only in São Paulo but nationwide. Names like Titãs, Ira!, RPM and Ultraje a Rigor among others started in the eighties. Some of them are playing until now. TV shows like Cassino do Chacrinha and Perdidos na Noite and radios like 89 FM started to support Rock. Nightclubs like Aeroanta, Area, Cave, Dama Xoc, Latitude 3001, Madame Satã, Napalm, Paulicéia Desvairada, Rose Bom Bom and Woodstock started playing all types of Rock even with live shows. In the decade Titãs sold 500 thousands copies from on album, while Ira! sold 285 thousand copies, Ultraje a Rigor 250 thousand copies and Rita Lee achieved 2 million and 200 thousand copies from one album. The record was from RPM with 2 million and 500 thousand copies but like Secos & Molhados in the previous decade the group split up soon. In 1985 we had the Rock in Rio with Rita Lee. In São Paulo we had the Hollywood Rock with Ira!, Ultraje a Rigor and Titãs. In 1981 we had a Punk Festival with Inocentes, Ratos de Porão e Cólera. Other groups from the decade were Metrô, Magazine(Kid Vinil), Fellini, Voluntários da Pátria, Mercenárias, Zero, Akira S e As Garotas Que Erraram, Korzus and Viper.

== 1990s ==
In 1990 we had the start of MTV Brasil and the increase of video industry that had started in the previous decade with MTV in the USA. We had Titãs and Rita Lee with many albums including the Acoustics from MTV. We had the return of RPM but without the same success. Nightclubs started to play other kinds of music. We had two festivals in São Paulo, the Hollywood Rock and the Monsters of Rock. There were four editions of the Hollywood Rock with Titãs twice and Dr. Sin once. We had the started of Angra, a power metal band that played in the first Monsters of Rock and then played in the shows of AC/DC in Brazil and achieved great success abroad, especially in France and Japan. In the city of Santos we had Charlie Brown Jr. with a mix of styles like hardcore, rap, skate punk creating a unique style. The phenom of the decade was the boys from Mamonas Assassinas with much fun on stage and in the lyrics, playing parodies of Heavy Metal and Brazilian Country Music and sold over a million and a half copies until the air accident that killed all the band. In the decade we had the start of Rap Rock, with Pavilhão 9 and Rappin' Hood. Other groups from the period were Dr. Sin, Hateen, WRY, CPM 22, Quatro Fatos, Efeito Garage, Forgotten Boys, Virgulóides, Eclyptika and Tihuana.

== 2000s ==
Metrô, Ultraje a Rigor, RPM and Os Mutantes. These groups returned to play in this decade. Ira! split up but returned again soon. Titãs never stopped even with the departure of some members and the death of Marcelo Frommer in 2001. In the decade we had the beginning of the Emotional Hardcore with simple lyrics about emotions and groups like CPM 22 and NX Zero with the help of Internet and social medias. Heavy Metal also continues outside the main media, but with stars like Shaman, Shadowside and Mindflow. Rita Lee won the Latin Grammy of best Rock Album of 2001. In 2008 we had the Maquinaria Rock Festival with Korzus and Ratos de Porão among international stars. We had three editions of Rock in Rio at Rio de Janeiro with Ira! and Ultraje a Rigor together in a jam at Rock in Rio 3, Angra at Rock in Rio 4 and Kiara Rocks at Rock in Rio 5. We had the beginning of the Virada Cultural in the city of São Paulo, a multi cultural event with many kind of events including Rock and Roll. Angra and Charlie Brown Jr. released many albums in the period until 2013 when Charlie Brown Jr lost his main member and singer Chorão. The band Restos de Nada also finished with the death of vocalist Douglas Alves Viscaino. In 2001 we had the start of Kiss FM, a radio station that play Classic Rock, but with two programs for Brazilian Rock. In 2011 Brasil 2000 FM quit playing rock. In 2013 we had the end of MTV Brasil. In the decade we had celebrations albums of Ultraje a Rigor and Ratos de Porão. In 2013 Rita Lee started a tour celebrating 50 years of career. Other groups from the period were Aliados, Rancore, Project46, Aditive, Dynastia, Cérebro Eletrônico, Cansei de Ser Sexy, Gloria, Envydust, Garotas Suecas, Almah, Fake, Nove Mil Anjos, Kiara Rocks, Vespas Mandarinas and A Banca.
