= Rita Lee =

Brazilian musician, author, actress and television host (1947–2023)

Rita Lee OMC ORB
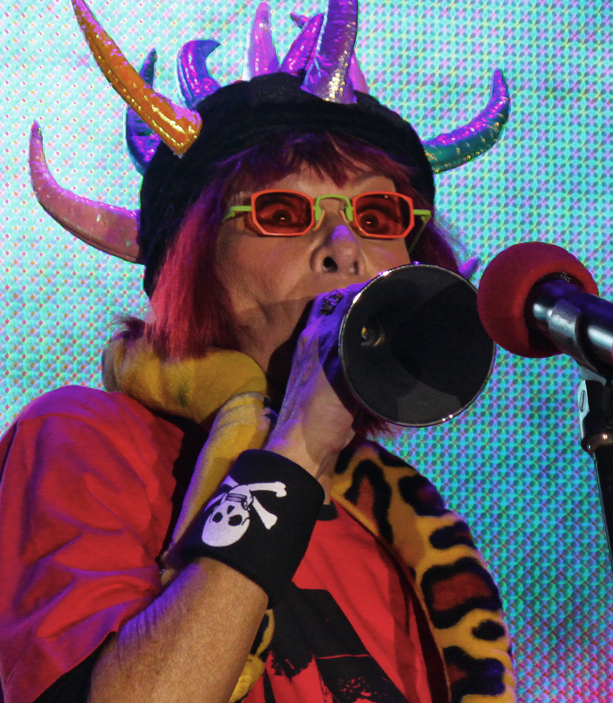
- Lee in 2011
- Born: Rita Lee Jones; 31 December 1947; São Paulo, Brazil
- Died: 8 May 2023 (aged 75); São Paulo, Brazil
- Occupations: Singer; songwriter; author; actress; television host
- Years active: 1966–2023
- Spouses: Arnaldo Baptista (m. 1968; div. 1977) Roberto de Carvalho (m. 1996)
- Children: 3, including Beto
- Musical career
- Genres: Pop rock; glam rock; MPB; tropicália; psychedelia; disco; new wave
- Instruments: Vocals; guitar; flute; percussion; keyboards; autoharp; banjo; harmonica
- Labels: Philips; Phonogram; Som Livre; EMI; Universal Music; Deckdisc; Biscoito Fino
- Formerly of: Os Mutantes; Tutti Frutti

Rita Lee Jones de Carvalho (31 December 1947 – 8 May 2023) (Note: Brazilian Portuguese pronunciation: [ˈʁi.tɐ ˈli] HEE-tah-LEE) was a Brazilian singer, songwriter, author, actress and television host. Dubbed the "Queen of Brazilian Rock", (Note: Lee was also referred to as the "Queen of Pop" due to her commercial phase in the 1980s, while "Queen of Pop Rock" emphasizes the hybrid nature of her music between the two styles.) she became one of the most influential figures in the country's popular music. Renowned for her constant reinvention and versatility across musical and audiovisual production, Lee was a pioneer of both rock and pop in Brazil. She blended international and national styles, creating a distinctive hybrid sound. Her songs and performances celebrated pleasure and female agency, establishing her as a cornerstone of artistic resistance during the military dictatorship. Lee remains a major influence on multiple generations of artists, particularly women.

Born and raised in São Paulo, she began her musical career in 1963 with Tulio's Trio and later the Teenage Singers, which evolved into Os Seis. She rose to national prominence as vocalist and multi-instrumentalist for the tropicalist group Os Mutantes. Solo stardom came with the album Fruto Proibido (1975), recorded with the band Tutti Frutti and regarded as a landmark of Brazilian rock. Her popularity continued to grow through a string of successful albums that helped popularize pop music in Brazil, most of them created in partnership with her husband Roberto de Carvalho, with whom she co-wrote much of her repertoire. Key releases include Rita Lee (1979), Rita Lee (1980), Saúde (1981), and Rita Lee & Roberto de Carvalho (1982), the latter one of the best-selling albums in Brazilian music history. Her songs became staples on the charts.

Lee's visibility increased through year-end TV specials on TV Globo, such as Rita Lee Jones (1980), Rita Lee Jones (1981), O Circo (1982), Rita Lee e Roberto de Carvalho (1985), and Rita Lee Especial (1995). She also worked as a host on programs including TVLeezão (1991), Saia Justa (2002), and Madame Lee (2005). As a writer, she published 11 books during her lifetime and two posthumously, most notably her first autobiography, which sold 70 times the average print run of a book in Brazil in its first year. She also acted in films and series and hosted radio programs. Her acting work earned awards such as Best Male Performer at the Rio Cine Festival and the Troféu Calunga for Best Supporting Actress. A committed vegan, she advocated for animal rights, women's rights, and the LGBT community.

With more than 55 million records sold, Lee is the best-selling female singer in Brazilian history and one of the highest-selling Latin music artists of all time. A pioneer of large-scale national tours, she became the first Brazilian artist to tour gymnasiums and stadiums, drawing 500,000 spectators during the highly successful Tour Brasil 83; the Tour 87/88 enjoyed similar acclaim. Among her honors are 12 Brazilian Music Awards, four APCA Awards, three Troféus Imprensa, two Latin Grammys, the Shell Music Award, and an honorary award from the União Brasileira de Compositores (UBC). Rolling Stone Brasil also ranked her among the greatest Brazilian voices and artists of all time.

== Life and career ==
=== Early life and career beginnings ===
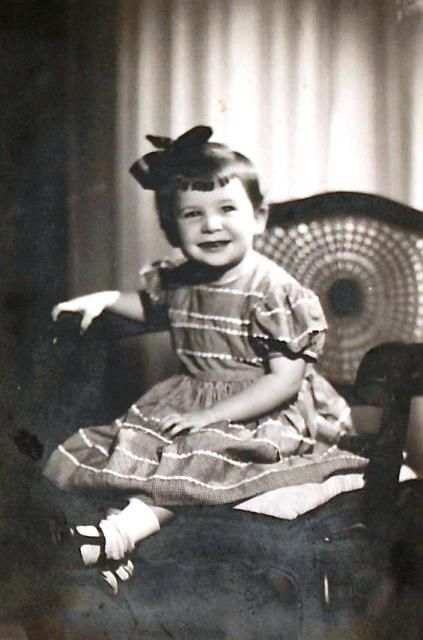
Lee as a child, in a family photo.

Rita Lee Jones was born on 31 December 1947 in São Paulo, the youngest daughter of Charles Fenley Jones, a Brazilian-born dentist of American descent—his Confederate ancestors from Alabama and Tennessee had settled in Santa Bárbara d'Oeste after the US Civil War—and Romilda Padula, a pianist of Italian origin from Molise. Her two older sisters were Mary Lee and Virgínia Lee Jones; their father gave all three daughters the compound middle name "Lee" in honor of Confederate general Robert E. Lee. Although her parents initially intended to name her Bárbara after Saint Barbara, at the baptism they chose Rita to honour her maternal grandmother Clorinda, who was known as Rita.

Lee grew up in the middle-class Vila Mariana neighbourhood, where she lived until the birth of her first child. She later described the area as holding many of her fondest memories. She attended the French-Brazilian Liceu Pasteur, becoming fluent in Portuguese, English, French, Spanish, and Italian. In 1968 she briefly enrolled in the Social Communication course at the University of São Paulo alongside the future actress Regina Duarte, but dropped out the following year.

As a child she studied classical piano with Magda Tagliaferro. Initially she dreamed of becoming an actress or veterinarian; her father hoped she would follow him into dentistry. Her early musical tastes were shaped by both US rock and roll—particularly Elvis Presley, the Beatles, and the Rolling Stones—and the Brazilian classics her parents played at home, including João Gilberto, Cauby Peixoto, Angela Maria, Maysa Matarazzo, and Carmen Miranda.

In her teens Lee began writing songs and performing. She first sang in public with Tulio's Trio, then formed an all-female vocal group, the Teenage Singers, who appeared at school parties. In 1964 they merged with a male trio, the Wooden Faces, to create the Six Sided Rockers; the band soon changed its name to Os Seis and released a single. After three members left, Lee and brothers Arnaldo and Sérgio Dias Baptista continued as Os Bruxos. In 1966, shortly before their television debut on O Pequeno Mundo de Ronnie Von (TV Record), presenter Ronnie Von—prompted by a suggestion from producer Alberto Helena Júnior inspired by the science-fiction novel O Império dos Mutantes by Stefan Wul—proposed the name Os Mutantes. The trio immediately adopted it.

=== 1966–72: Os Mutantes and early solo albums ===
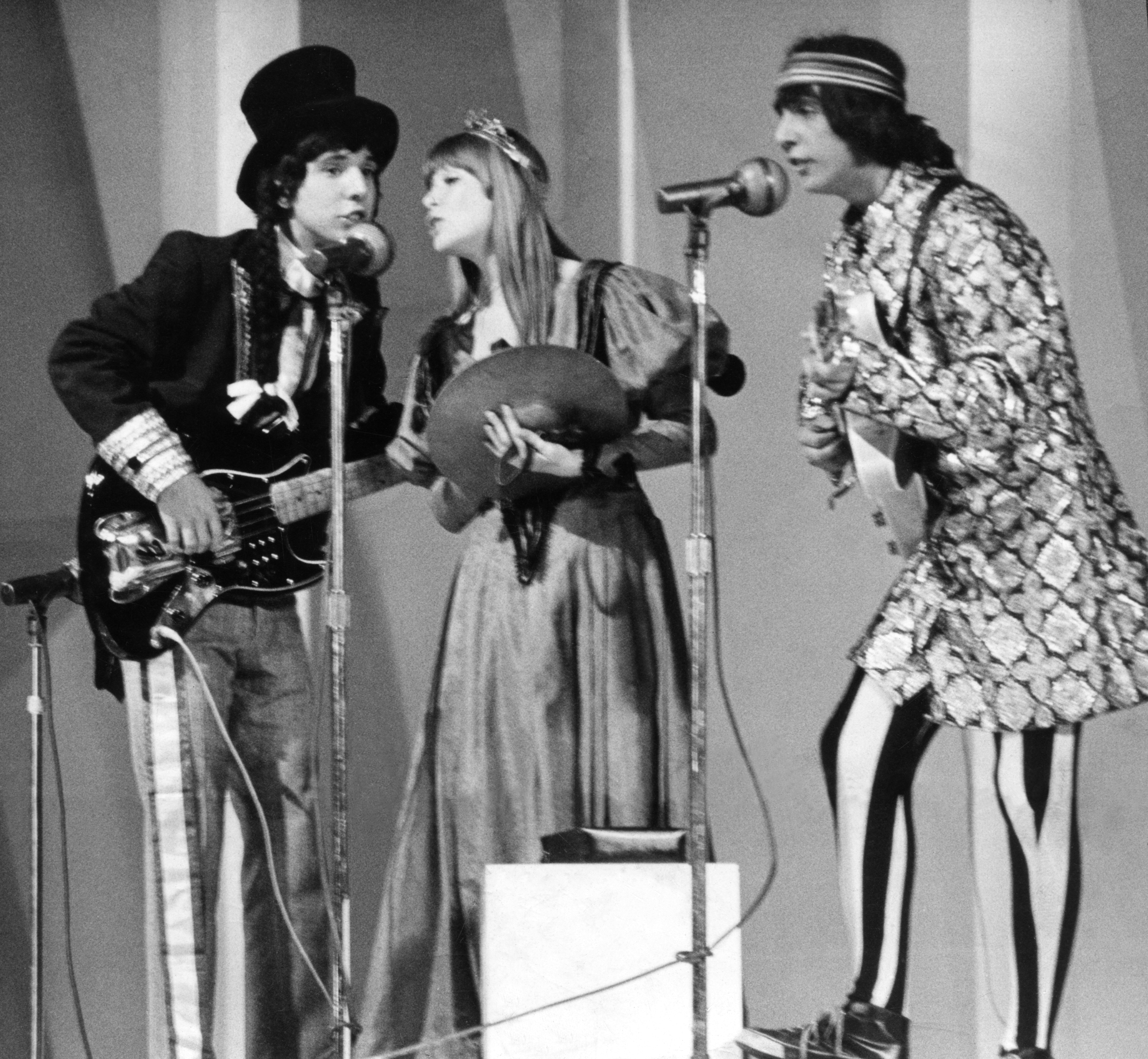
Os Mutantes in 1969; from left: Arnaldo Baptista, Lee and Sérgio Dias.

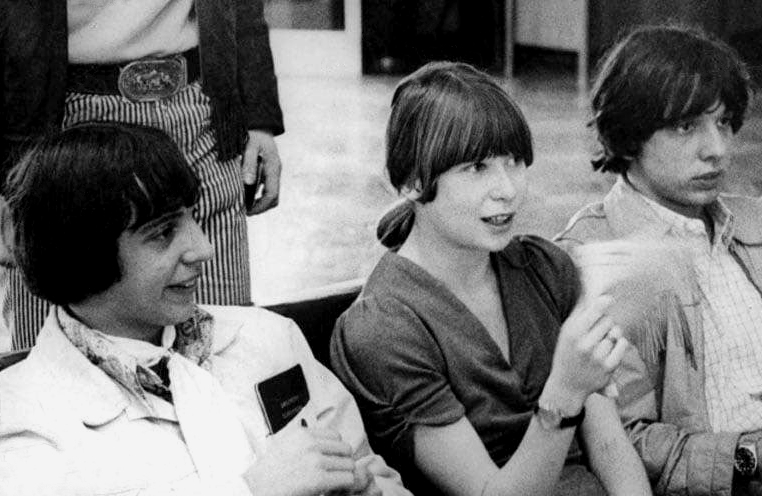
Os Mutantes in 1971

For six years, Lee was a core member of the pioneering tropicalista band Os Mutantes, alongside Arnaldo Baptista and Sérgio Dias. She contributed lead vocals, flute, and percussion, while occasionally playing synthesizer, banjo, and autoharp. Lee also experimented with unconventional sound sources, such as a pest-control spray pump to create effects in the track "Le premier bonheur du jour", and served as the group's primary lyricist. In 1967, Os Mutantes backed Gilberto Gil at the III Festival de Música Popular Brasileira on TV Record, performing his composition "Domingo no parque".

The band released six studio albums between 1968 and 1972. Their self-titled debut (1968) is widely regarded as a landmark of Brazilian music, blending psychedelia, tropicalismo, and avant-garde elements to produce enduring hits including "A minha menina", "Dom Quixote", "Balada do louco", "2001 (Dois mil e um)", and "Ando meio desligado". Lee married bandmate Arnaldo Baptista in 1968; the couple separated in 1972, with their divorce finalized in 1977.

While still with Os Mutantes, Lee recorded two solo albums featuring backing from her bandmates. Build Up (1970), her debut, included several songs co-written with Arnaldo; it originated as the setlist for a private corporate event organized by the Fenit company in São Paulo. The album yielded her first solo single, "José", a Portuguese-language cover of Georges Moustaki's "Joseph" (previously recorded by Nara Leão). Her second effort, Hoje É o Primeiro Dia do Resto da Sua Vida (1972), was credited solely to Lee because Os Mutantes had already released an album that year, and their Philips contract prohibited additional releases under the band name. Os Mutantes performed and recorded the material, but only Lee appeared on the cover and received billing.

Tensions arose from the dissolution of her marriage and disagreements over the band's shift toward progressive rock. Lee was expelled from Os Mutantes by Arnaldo in 1972. Accounts of the departure vary, with some early reports suggesting she left voluntarily. Lee later described the moment in her 2016 autobiography Rita Lee: uma autobiografia:

My exit from the group happened in the classic style of "the groom is the last to know"—in this case, the bride. After spending the day out, I arrived at rehearsal to find a tense, heavy atmosphere. One would look away, another stared at the ceiling, fiddling with their instrument and such. Finally, Arnaldo broke the ice, took the floor, and informed me—not in these exact words, but the meaning was the same—that I was the corpse at this funeral. "We've decided that from now on, you're out of Os Mutantes because we're going in a progressive-virtuoso direction, and you don't have the chops as an instrumentalist." A spit in the face would have been less humiliating. Instead of falling to my knees, crying and begging forgiveness for being born a woman, I made a silent, elegant exit. I left the room in dramatic fashion, packed my bags, grabbed Danny (the dog), and adiós.

In a 2007 interview, Arnaldo confirmed: "I kicked Rita out of Os Mutantes."

=== 1973–78: Tutti Frutti and national recognition ===
In 1973, Lee formed the folk rock duo Cilibrinas do Éden with guitarist Lúcia Turnbull. They performed only once at the Phono 73 festival before disbanding. Lee then joined Lisergia, featuring guitarist Luis Sérgio Carlini, bassist Lee Marcucci, drummer Paulinho Braga, and Turnbull. In addition to lead vocals, she played piano, synthesizer, harmonica, and guitar. In August, the band premiered Tutti Frutti, her first solo show, in the basement of Teatro Ruth Escobar in São Paulo, directed by Antônio Bivar. Its success with underground rock audiences quickly grew crowds to around 200 people per night, inspiring the group's new name.

Signed by Philips, they recorded their debut album, which the label withheld for being excessively alternative and due to censorship. Forced by contract to return to the studio, the group released Atrás do Porto Tem uma Cidade in 1974. Producer Marco Mazzola, hired without the band's approval, heavily altered the arrangements, causing widespread dissatisfaction. During a meeting at Phonogram, after an internal report noted poor commercial performance despite promotion, Lee insulted the executives and was expelled from the label.

Fruto Proibido reached stores in June 1975 through Som Livre, blending hard rock, blues, and glam rock. Widely regarded as one of Lee's masterpieces and a landmark of Brazilian rock, the album was ranked by Paste as the 12th best of 1975. Rolling Stone Brasil called it "the first Brazilian rock album that did not sound like a version of its English source material" and placed it 15th among the "100 Greatest Brazilian Music Records" list. It became the first Brazilian rock record to achieve major sales, peaking at number six between LPs on the year-end NOPEM chart, with over 700,000 copies sold to date. Four singles received videos on TV Globo's Fantástico—"Ovelha negra", "Agora só falta você", "Esse tal de Roque Enrow", and "Dançar pra não dançar"—turning the first three into major hits. The album enabled Brazil's first major rock tour, which crossed the country from north to south. Its innovative staging and striking costumes further distinguished the shows.

In 1976, the band released Entradas e Bandeiras, produced by Pena Schmidt, with singles "Coisas da vida" and "Corista de rock". Absent during mixing, Lee was displeased by the album's heavy emphasis on Carlini's guitars. While writing "Bandido corazón" for Ney Matogrosso, she met guitarist Roberto de Carvalho, beginning a personal and professional partnership and bringing him into Tutti Frutti. In August, while pregnant with her first child, Beto Lee, she was arrested for marijuana possession with her manager and bandmates. The incident was seen as a military dictatorship effort to make an example of the youth. Lee claimed she had quit drugs due to her pregnancy and alleged the substances were planted by police. Transferred to Hipódromo women's prison, she was visited by Elis Regina, who demanded medical care for pregnancy complications and stayed until the bleeding stopped. After a month and a half in detention, she received a one-year house arrest sentence and a fine. She served it at her parents' home in Vila Mariana, permitted only to perform at night. Upon returning to the stage at Ginásio do Palmeiras, she wore a caricatural prisoner outfit inspired by the Beagle Boys and was greeted with strong support from the young audience.

[Regina] stayed on duty there until I was medicated and the bleeding had stopped. She even ordered some food from a restaurant because she thought I was way too skinny for a pregnant woman.

— Lee recounts Elis Regina visiting her in prison in her first autobiography.

After house arrest ended, Lee joined Gilberto Gil on the Refestança tour, which visited eight state capitals and ended at Maracanãzinho in Rio de Janeiro, where the stage collapsed. A live album documented the shows. In 1978, Babilônia was released as the fourth and final Rita Lee & Tutti Frutti album, producing singles "Jardins da Babilônia", "Eu e meu gato", and "Miss Brasil 2000" and selling 150,000 copies. Internal conflicts led to the band's breakup. Dissatisfied with his diminished role, Carlini left and took the Tutti Frutti name with him. The remaining members continued with Lee, who renamed the group Rita Lee & Cães e Gatos for the promotional tour.

=== 1979–83: Pop phase and partnership with Roberto de Carvalho ===
In 1979, following the end of the band Tutti Frutti, Lee formed a compositional and stage partnership with Carvalho. The collaboration marked her definitive transition from rock to a more accessible, commercial pop sound. In August that year, the first album of the partnership, Rita Lee—popularly known as Mania de Você—was released while Lee was pregnant with the couple's second child, João Lee. The record sold approximately 800,000 copies and established Lee as Brazil's first pop superstar. The title track became a massive hit after featuring in a commercial for Ellus jeans, while "Chega mais" served as the opening theme for the telenovela of the same name. That same year, Lee appeared on the TV Globo special Mulher 80, which celebrated the leading female singers of Brazilian music.

Her popularity surged further with the September 1980 release of the next album, also titled Rita Lee but widely known as Lança-perfume. The record brought Lee her first significant international breakthrough, particularly in French-speaking countries, where it reached the top 10 in Switzerland, Belgium, and France, selling more than 60,000 copies in the latter. It also performed strongly in Argentina, selling 200,000 copies and peaking at number seven, while in Brazil sales exceeded one million. By the end of 1981, Lee was featured on the cover of Exame magazine for her success amid the Brazilian music industry's crisis and was recognized as the country's best-selling female artist. The album earned double platinum certification from the ABPD and ranked third among the year's best-selling records in Brazil. The title track topped charts on France's three main radio stations and became the most popular Brazilian song of the year, later being re-recorded by various artists in French, Italian, Spanish, German, and Hebrew. "Baila comigo" gained further prominence as the opening theme of the telenovela of the same name. At the 17th Troféu Imprensa, Lee won awards for Best Female Singer and Best Song ("Lança-perfume"), while the promotional tour received the Best Show award from the APCA Popular Music Award.

At the end of 1981, strategically timed for the Christmas shopping season, the album Saúde was released. It was the first credited directly to the duo Rita Lee & Roberto de Carvalho. The record faced censorship for lyrics deemed contrary to "good morals" and criticism for its New York mixing and heavy use of electronic drums. Despite this, Veja magazine described it as "the most intriguing and innovative album of her career." Recorded during Lee's pregnancy with the couple's third child, Antônio Lee, the album featured the characteristic carnival-influenced style of the partnership. It produced major national hits with the title track and "Banho de espuma", the latter among the most played songs in Brazil that year. The release reinforced Lee's position as the dominant figure in Brazilian pop and earned her another Troféu Imprensa for Best Female Singer. Although it received 400,000 pre-orders and was supported by a year-end TV Globo special, sales were lower than expected, with only about 30,000 additional copies sold by October 1982. The album still achieved platinum certification, charted in Uruguay, and reached the top five in Portugal. Lee later attributed the comparatively weaker commercial performance to the absence of a major promotional tour, noting that illness had prevented her from traveling to state capitals for shows.

In 1982, the duo released their self-titled album Rita Lee & Roberto de Carvalho, commonly known as Flagra. Its two singles had strong success: "Flagra" served as the opening theme for the telenovela Final Feliz, while "Cor-de-rosa choque" was written for the Globo program TV Mulher and required revision by federal censorship due to references to menstruation. The album achieved exceptional commercial success, earning double platinum certification in Brazil and silver in Portugal. It sold two million copies overall and ranked as the second best-selling album in Brazil in 1983. This success positioned Lee as the biggest record seller in the country after Roberto Carlos and the artist with the highest earnings per copy sold.

At the end of 1982, Lee and Carvalho previewed their upcoming tour with two shows at Ginásio do Ibirapuera in São Paulo, which were recorded for TV Globo's year-end special O Circo. The Tour Brasil 83, held in gymnasiums and stadiums across the country, was inspired by the Rolling Stones' 1981 American tour, which the couple had attended. The tour inaugurated the era of Brazilian megashows, attracting 500,000 spectators in just three months—a record for national tours at the time. The production featured sophisticated set design, elaborate lighting, and multiple costume changes, making it the largest spectacle ever produced in Brazil up to that point. Due to the high costs, the final revenue was considered disappointing, totaling around 80 million cruzeiros.

During the tour, the duo released the international album Baila Conmigo in April 1983, consisting of Spanish-language versions of their biggest hits. The album sold 80,000 copies in Mexico within one month and reached eighth place in Argentina. A music video for the title track was filmed in Mexico, and the song climbed into the top five in Argentine singles sales.

=== 1983–90: Post-commercial peak and decline of the duo ===
After the most successful tour of her career, Lee and Carvalho released their third duo album, Bombom, in 1983. Recorded with contributions from Toto members Steve Lukather and Mike Porcaro, the album contained explicit content that provoked strict censorship from Brazil's military regime. Two tracks were scratched on initial vinyl pressings to prevent playback, public performances and radio airplay were banned, and sales were restricted to buyers over 18. Despite poor reception from the duo themselves and from critics, who labeled it a fiasco, Bombom still achieved double platinum certification in less than four months. At the height of the negative reception, Lee announced she would not release a new album in 1984. The label responded with Rita Hits, a collection of remixes, to prevent a full hiatus.

In 1985, the duo performed at the Viña del Mar International Song Festival in Chile, winning the Silver Torch, and at the inaugural Rock in Rio. Lee only agreed to go to the latter to quash rumors she had leukemia. Lee criticized the Rock in Rio organization for giving limited time to the Brazilian acts for their soundchecks compared to the international ones, which Lee saw as disrespectful to local rock pioneers, the theft of her Fender Telecaster during the event, and her own performance, which she blamed on a hangover after celebrating overnight with Carvalho at the Copacabana Palace. Lee refused to return for the second weekend. Following her father's death and a period of alcohol and drug use, she released Rita e Roberto in September 1985. The album adopted a darker, more cinematic tone. Instead of a traditional concert special, Lee pioneered visual albums in Brazil, aired during a year-end TV Globo special in which she played tragicomic characters. Though better received than Bombom, it sold just over 500,000 copies and ended the duo's streak of major radio hits. Years later, "Vítima" found new success as the theme for the telenovela A Próxima Vítima.

After leaving Som Livre in 1986, Lee created the radio program Radioamador on 89 FM A Rádio Rock with Antônio Bivar. Using the pseudonym Lita Ree, she hosted the show and performed multiple characters. Concerned that children's media ignored issues such as global warming, animal protection, and mining dangers, she began writing children's books. Her first, Dr. Alex, launched a series using stories to introduce these topics. She then signed with EMI and released Flerte Fatal in May 1987. The album sold better than its predecessor, with 500,000 pre-orders and platinum certification. Its lead single "Pega rapaz" restored her radio presence. After Estadão suggested she was in "creative menopause," Lee cut all ties with the press. She and Carvalho then embarked on what would be her last all-gymnasium tour, which drew around 250,000 spectators. A recording from the Maracanãzinho in Rio de Janeiro, directed by Nelson Motta, aired as a year-end special on Rede Manchete. The show featured banners reading "Camisinha já" and "Diretas ontem" descending to the stage.

In 1988, Lee published her second children's book, Dr. Alex e os Reis de Angra, about villains kidnapping a princess to build nuclear power plants. She and Carvalho released Zona Zen in December. Poorly received by critics, the album reflected strain in their partnership and saw sales drop to pre-1979 levels. Lee later said she was not proud of it and wished it had never been made. Despite the lukewarm response, she won the first Sharp Music Award for Best Pop/Rock Female Singer. In May 1989, she contributed the title song to the film Better Days Ahead, winning a Sharp Award for Best Film Soundtrack. That year, she made a brief appearance in the telenovela Top Model as Maria Regina, a character who arrived and left via flying saucer. In 1990, she published Dr. Alex na Amazônia, in which the character fights rainforest destruction, fires, and threats to animals and indigenous communities. To fulfill her contract, the duo ended the decade with a self-titled album known as Perto do Fogo. Its title track was co-written with Cazuza, while "La Miranda" won the Sharp Award for Best Pop/Rock Song and served as the theme for the telenovela Lua Cheia de Amor.

=== 1991–04: Carvalho's return and critical acclaim ===
In 1991, Lee temporarily suspended her professional partnership with Carvalho. While he traveled to London to study astrology and Kabbalah, she remained in São Paulo, dedicating herself to the acoustic guitar. Invited by radio host Tutti Maravilha to participate in a tribute concert to Elis Regina in Belo Horizonte, she approved the result and launched the acoustic show Bossa 'n' Roll. Beginning in small venues, the tour quickly expanded to larger gymnasiums and reached international stages, including a performance at the Montreux Jazz Festival in Switzerland. During the excursion, her struggles with alcoholism—already apparent within the family—intensified. After Carvalho warned her that such behavior would not be tolerated around their children, she moved to an apartment in Pinheiros and deepened her addiction, supported by her eldest son, Beto, who had just finished high school and came to live with her to provide care.

Recorded live in Campinas, the self-titled album became one of Brazil's first major unplugged successes, anticipating the Acústico MTV phenomenon by several years. It sold 400,000 copies, peaked at number five on the national best-sellers chart in 1992, and earned Lee the Sharp Awards for Best Female Singer and Best Pop/Rock Album, along with the APCA Popular Music Award for Best Show. Still during the tour, in June 1991, she signed with MTV Brasil to co-host the weekly program TVLeezão with Bivar. The show brought characters from their earlier radio program Radioamador to television, blending music videos, sketches, and interviews. One character, Lita Ree—described as "an even more sincere version" of Lee—appeared in an episode of the telenovela Vamp. The program ended in September of that year after a fire destroyed the studio.

In 1992, Lee portrayed Raul Seixas in the short film Tanta Estrela por Aí…, directed by Tadeu Knudsen. Her performance earned her first acting award: Best Male Performer at the 10th Rio Cine Festival.

Returning to Som Livre, Lee embraced rock 'n' roll again with her self-titled 1993 album, popularly known as Todas as Mulheres do Mundo. The release won her the Sharp Award for Best Pop/Rock Female Singer; at the ceremony, she received a standing ovation and emerged as the most discussed personality of the night. For three months, she also served as a columnist for Jornal da Tarde of the Grupo Estadão. In 1995, preparing to open for the Rolling Stones at Hollywood Rock, she underwent emergency detoxification treatment. During the Rio de Janeiro performance, she appeared dressed as Mary, mother of Jesus, and sang an Ave Maria while performing the title track, as a homage to the band's first show in Brazil. The gesture provoked nationwide controversy for its use of Catholic imagery in a song about female empowerment, drawing condemnation from the Archdiocese of Rio de Janeiro, which called it an affront to the population's religious sentiments. Later that year, she resumed her collaboration with Carvalho on the A Marca da Zorra show—the duo's first major production since the late 1980s.

In 1996, Lee swept three Sharp Awards in one evening: Best Female Singer, Best Pop/Rock Album (for the live recording of the previous tour), and Best Show. Speaking to the press, she said: "Deep down, for someone whose work has always been heavily criticized, it feels really good to finally be recognized." She also became the first woman to win the Shell Music Award in the prize's 16-year history. A planned performance at the ceremony was canceled after she suffered a serious fracture in her right mandibular condyle from falling off the balcony of her country house in Caucaia do Alto while under the influence of alcohol. Surgery involving titanium pins in the jaw and silicone implants in the lips resolved the injury, but it initially impaired her speech, threatened her singing voice, and caused a permanent 40% hearing loss in her right ear. In the wake of the accident, the couple formalized their civil marriage; Lee began signing as Rita Lee Jones de Carvalho and appeared with her husband and children on the cover of Caras magazine.

In 1997, she was the main honoree at the tenth Sharp Awards—sharing the spotlight with Fernanda Montenegro at the Shell Theater Awards—in a tribute featuring performances by Caetano Veloso, Gilberto Gil, Ney Matogrosso, Zélia Duncan, Fernanda Abreu, and Joyce, who composed the new song "Minha gata Rita Lee" for the occasion. The album Santa Rita de Sampa represented one of the most anticipated comebacks of the 1990s; its title derived from Lee's self-description as "the patron saint of unusual things, often considered profane." The music video for "Obrigado não" sparked controversy by broadcasting the first same-sex kiss on national television, shown on MTV and Fantástico despite attempts to restrict its slot. Lee once again took home the Sharp Award for Best Pop/Rock Female Singer.

In September 1998, she released her third live album, Acústico MTV, which featured reinterpretations of earlier hits and two new tracks. Certified platinum for both CD and DVD, with 650,000 copies sold, it was widely regarded as one of the strongest entries in the series. Promotion included appearances on Programa Livre and Hebe, along with the Meio Desleegada tour, which visited multiple states and concluded in May 1999 with a performance for 100,000 spectators at Ibirapuera Park in São Paulo.

3001 (2000), featuring collaborations with Tom Zé and Itamar Assumpção, won the Latin Grammy Award for Best Portuguese Language Rock or Alternative Album. An international tour (2000–2001) aired as a Rede Bandeirantes special with guests Caetano Veloso, Zélia Duncan, Paula Toller, and Pato Fu. Lee recorded Beatles covers for Aqui, Ali, Em Qualquer Lugar (2001; released internationally as Bossa 'n Beatles), blending bossa nova, rock, and forró. The record reached number one in Argentina, earned platinum certification there, and led to a sold-out concert at Buenos Aires' Luna Park that was widely regarded as her consecration in the country.

Compilation albums Para Sempre and Novelas (2001–2002) followed, the latter collecting her telenovela themes. Lee joined GNT's Saia Justa (2002) alongside Fernanda Young and Marisa Orth. Balacobaco (2003) sold 550,000 copies behind the hit "Amor e sexo" and marked her return to major commercial success with a studio album of entirely new material—her first major seller since the late 1980s. In 2004, she performed for over 200,000 at São Paulo's Vale do Anhangabaú during the city's 450th-anniversary celebrations.

=== 2010–2019: Retirement from touring, Reza, and literary career ===
In October 2010, Lee premiered her Etc... show, opening in Belo Horizonte and reviving several hits that had long disappeared from her repertoire. The tour traveled across Brazil and extended to Buenos Aires, where she performed at the Teatro Gran Rex. Around this time, after receiving a cell phone as a gift from one of her sons, she joined Twitter and quickly became an active user, amassing some 670,000 followers. Her sharp, humorous posts earned her the nickname "the crazy woman of Twitter" in the press. After a controversial tweet criticizing the Arena Corinthians drew threats from fans, she left the platform, stating: "The fear that something could happen to me and my family is real."

In January 2012, during an Etc... concert at Circo Voador in Rio de Janeiro, Lee announced her retirement from live shows, citing physical fragility. When asked about the decision, she explained: "It was 47 years nonstop on the road, I deserve to slack off […]." Her farewell concert took place the following week at the Projeto Verão festival in Aracaju. During the show, she publicly criticized the military police for their aggressive crowd control. Accused of disrespecting authority, she was briefly detained after the performance but was soon released. In a later interview with Fantástico, Lee revealed she had been diagnosed with bipolar disorder. Carvalho noted that the condition, which was still not properly treated at the time, had contributed to the incident, explaining that "it was a phase when the right medication was still being sought."

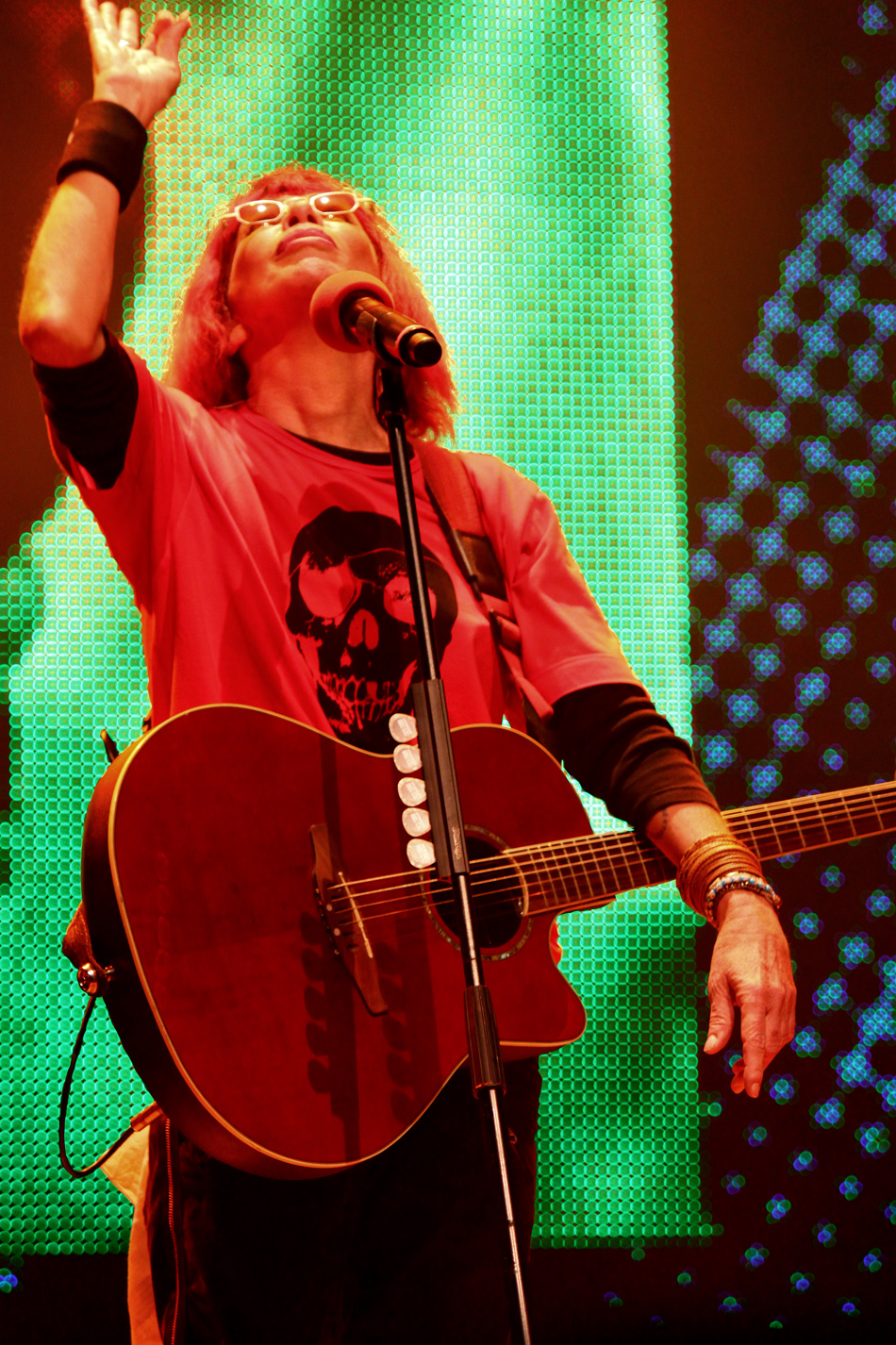
Lee during the Etc... show, May 2011

After nine years without new studio material—her last album had been Balacobaco (2003)—Lee released Reza in April 2012. The album received a modest critical response; O Grito! observed that "the Rita from Mutantes, Tutti Frutti and the 80s no longer exists, but the living red-haired legend still has history, talent and fans who deserve better work." Commercially, however, it performed strongly: the title track swiftly overtook Michel Teló's "Ai, se eu te pego" as the top-selling song on the Brazilian iTunes Store, joined the soundtrack of the telenovela Avenida Brasil, and ranked among the year's most consumed albums in the country. In November, Lee returned to the stage for a one-off performance at the Green Move Festival in Belo Horizonte, where she briefly lowered her pants and turned her back to the audience, sparking widespread controversy. Her final concert came in early 2013 before an audience of around 35,000 at Vale do Anhangabaú in São Paulo, during celebrations for the city's 459th anniversary. Later that year, she featured on Sérgio Britto's "Purabossanova", which won her the Contigo! Music Award for Best Song. From then on, she focused primarily on literary work.

To mark 50 years in her career, she published Storynhas with Companhia das Letras, in collaboration with cartoonist Laerte Coutinho. The book collected 76 short stories inspired by her Twitter posts. At the book-signing event at Shopping Iguatemi in São Paulo, she appeared with short, choppy hair showing gray strands, having abandoned her signature red dye. She said she was "loving being a homemaker" and wanted to "stay anonymous."

In 2016, she released her first autobiography, Rita Lee: uma autobiografia, through Globo Livros. The book sold more than 200,000 copies—roughly seventy times the average print run for a book in Brazil—and received unanimous critical acclaim. It won the APCA Literature Award in the Biography/Autobiography/Memoir category, while Lee herself received the Grand Prize of the Critics for her overall contribution to Popular Music. The autobiography ultimately sold over 350,000 copies. In 2017, she published the children's and young adult collection Dropz, featuring 61 illustrated stories on diverse themes. She said the book was written in just three months, without pressure or a fixed routine. In 2018, she released FavoRita, co-authored with Guilherme Samora, which gathered rare photographs, documents of songs censored during the military dictatorship, fashion highlights, and a new cover photo essay. In 2019, she returned to children's literature 27 years after Dr. Alex e o Oráculo de Quartz (1992) with Amiga ursa: uma história triste, mas com final feliz.

=== 2020–2023: Final years ===
In May 2020, a scheduled special appearance at her son Beto's show in São Paulo was canceled due to health restrictions imposed by the COVID-19 pandemic. During this period, Lee immersed herself in composition and announced plans for a new studio album—her first since Reza (2012)—which would include the punk rock track "Vírus do horror", inspired by the pandemic. The project ultimately did not materialize, although she reiterated her intention to record a new album, describing it as "a good idea." In 2021, the duo Anavitória featured Lee on their album Cor, where she recited a passage by Simone de Beauvoir on the track "Amarelo, azul e branco". That May, at age 73, she received a routine medical examination and was diagnosed with a primary tumor in her left lung. Doctors initially gave her three to four months to live. As treatment progressed, the cancer metastasized, and she began chemotherapy.

Still in 2021, her son João curated three volumes of the project Rita Lee & Roberto – Classix Remix, which compiled 42 tracks remixed by various DJs from her original repertoire. The volumes were released between April and June. Around the same time, she released "Change", a collaboration with Carvalho and electronic producer Gui Boratto. The dance-pop song, sung in English and French, marked her first release in nine years and was later included in the soundtrack of the telenovela Um Lugar ao Sol. Reflecting on the single, Lee said: "[…] enough of suffering, it is time to spread our little wings and attract joy."

At the beginning of 2022, Lee continued her children's book series Dr. Alex with the fifth installment, Dr. Alex & Vovó Ritinha: uma aventura no espaço, which explored themes of religiosity and the importance of the planet. After 11 months of treatment, involving more than 30 sessions of radiotherapy and chemotherapy, April examinations revealed that one of the tumors—which she had nicknamed "Jair" in reference to then-president Jair Bolsonaro, a frequent target of her criticism — had disappeared. It was also announced that she was writing Rita Lee: outra autobiografia, the second volume of her memoirs, covering her experiences during the pandemic and cancer treatment. From then on, Lee's public appearances were limited to occasional photos shared by her husband and sons on social media, along with brief interactions with fans.

In November 2022, Lee received the Lifetime Achievement Award at the 23rd Latin Grammy Awards. Tributes were performed by Luísa Sonza, Giulia Be, Paula Lima, and Manu Gavassi, but on medical advice she did not attend the ceremony. That same month, she appeared on the cover of Rolling Stone Brasil's digital edition, which included an exclusive photo shoot by Samora and an unpublished interview. In it, she declared: "I prefer to be called 'patron saint of freedom' rather than 'queen of rock,' which I find somewhat tacky." In February 2023, Lee was hospitalized at Albert Einstein Hospital in São Paulo. Hours after the news broke, Carvalho asked for privacy on social media, explaining that she had been admitted for examinations and evaluations. She was discharged the following month and began receiving palliative care at home, supported by two nurses. By this stage she had lost the ability to walk and lived in a hospital room adapted within her São Paulo apartment. It was then announced that Rita Lee: outra autobiografia would be released on 22 May by Globo Livros. In the book, Lee detailed her cancer treatment. Her final public appearance on social media came in April, when her husband and son João shared photos of her watching the "Palco Rita Lee" tribute episode of the television program Altas Horas, which featured performances by Céu, Paulo Ricardo, Tiago Iorc, Zezé Motta, and her son Beto.

== Death ==
Around the night of 8 May 2023, Lee's condition worsened again, and she died surrounded by family at her home, at the age of 75, from lung cancer. The following morning, the family publicly confirmed her death.

Following the announcement, numerous artists paid her tribute, including Pitty, Gilberto Gil, Milton Nascimento, Ney Matogrosso, Fafá de Belém, Carlinhos Brown, and Fito Páez. President Luiz Inácio Lula da Silva decreed three days of national mourning, stating in a note: "An artist ahead of her time. She considered the title of queen of rock inappropriate, but the nickname does justice to her trajectory." Her death spurred a resurgence of her albums and books on the charts. The wake took place on 10 May 2023 at the Professor Aristóteles Orsini Planetarium in Ibirapuera Park—a location that symbolized Lee's longstanding connection to the space, making her the first person to be waked there. The farewell was planned by Lee herself, who specified the venue, the decoration, its open-to-the-public nature, and the color of her attire. Family members, close friends, and public figures such as Xuxa, Serginho Groisman, Pedro Bial, and Maria Rita offered condolences on site. The event drew approximately 6,000 fans, who lined up to pay their final personal respects, many carrying items associated with the artist, such as vinyl records and her own books. During the transfer of her body for cremation later that night, admirers chanted "Rita, eu te amo" ("Rita, I love you") and sang the classic "Ovelha negra" in farewell.

Lee had expressed a wish for her body to be cremated and her ashes scattered in her garden. Carvalho chose, however, not to fully honor this request during his lifetime, intending instead for their ashes to be mixed together; currently, they are kept at the couple's residence in a spherical urn placed atop a kind of domestic shrine.

A prophecy recorded by the artist herself on the final page of her first autobiography drew media attention:

"When I die, I can imagine the words of affection from those who detest me. Some radio stations will play my songs without demanding payola, colleagues will say I'll be missed in the music world, maybe they'll even name a dead-end street after me. The fans, those sincere ones, will wave my album covers and sing 'Ovelha negra', the TVs will already have a summary of my career ready to air on the news and a little note in some magazines' obits. On social media, some will say: 'Huh, I thought the old lady had already died, lol.' No politician will dare show up at my wake, since I never appeared on any of their platforms and I'd rise from the coffin to boo them. Meanwhile, there I'll be, soul present in heaven, playing my autoharp and singing to God: 'Thank you Lord, finally sedated.'"

According to the newspaper Correio Braziliense, Lee left an estate estimated at around 30 million reais, consisting of assets that generate copyright royalties, along with businesses, real estate, and various investments.

=== Repercussion ===
Lee's death received international coverage, appearing in English-, Spanish-, French-, and German-language newspapers, and triggered a significant surge in demand for her recorded and literary works. On the day her passing was announced, she became the most-searched personality globally on YouTube, with notable interest in Portugal, Uruguay, Paraguay, and Argentina. The following day—10 May—Lee ranked as the fourth most-streamed artist in Brazil and the sixth in Portugal on Spotify, with twelve tracks entering the top 50 of the platform's Daily Viral Songs in Brazil. The song "Ovelha negra" reached sixth place—marking her highest-ever position on the chart—followed, in descending order, by "Mania de você", "Coisas da vida", "Desculpe o auê", "Minha vida", "Saúde", "Agora só falta você", "Lança-perfume", "Doce vampiro", "Reza", and "Coisas da vida (ao Vivo)". In the week of 5 to 11 May, four albums from Lee's discography entered the Weekly Top Albums Brazil on Spotify: the compilation Lança Perfume e Outras Manias led at 17th place, followed by Mania de Você at 39th, while Acústico MTV and Fruto Proibido made the top 200.

In the publishing sphere, Rita Lee: uma autobiografia (2016) became the best-selling book in Brazil between 8 and 14 May 2023, according to BookInfo data. The work also topped the overall Amazon list—the country's leading book retail platform—and the nonfiction category in Veja magazine, with FavoRita (2018) ranking in the top 10. On the PublishNews list—which tracks sales exclusively in physical bookstores—the 2016 volume reached first place in the week of 15 to 21 May. On 22 May 2023, Globo Livros released Rita Lee: outra autobiografia, which, still in pre-sale, hit fifth place among Amazon's best-sellers and rose to the top of the overall list within just three days. In Veja magazine's annual 2023 retrospective, Rita Lee: outra autobiografia headed the list of the year's best-selling nonfiction books, while the previous autobiography placed sixth. Overall, the artist's literary works have sold more than one million copies.

=== Posthumous releases ===
In January 2011—one year before announcing her retirement from live performances—Lee began work on the album Bossa 'n Movies. Intended as a sequel to her 1991 live album Bossa 'n Roll, it was to feature Portuguese-language versions, written by Lee herself, of famous movie themes reinterpreted in bossa nova style. However, she prioritized the original-songs album Reza (2012) and set Bossa 'n Movies aside after recording vocals for just two tracks.

One of them, "Voando"—Lee's Portuguese version of Domenico Modugno and Franco Migliacci's Italian song "Volare"—was premiered by Globo's Fantástico program on 9 June 2024, thirteen years after recording. The single was released the following day, credited to Lee and Roberto de Carvalho, who served as musical producer, arranger, and sole performer on guitar, bass, programming, and keyboards. It won the 2025 Brazilian Music Awards in the Audiovisual Project category.

On 8 May 2025—two years after Lee's death—the documentary Rita Lee: Mania de Você premiered on HBO Max. Directed by Guido Goldberg and produced by Argentina's Mandarina Contenidos, the film presents an intimate portrait of Lee's life and career through exclusive interviews, archival footage, and testimonies from family, musicians, and celebrities including Gilberto Gil and Ney Matogrosso. A highlight is the reading of a letter Lee wrote to her family shortly before her death, reflecting on her journey and legacy.

Less than two weeks later, on 22 May—the feast day of Saint Rita of Cascia, which Lee had symbolically adopted as her "new birthday" and which São Paulo had officially designated as Rita Lee Day—the documentary Ritas opened in Brazilian cinemas. Directed by Oswaldo Santana and co-directed by Karen Harley, the film eschews celebrity interviews and biographical narration in favor of Lee's own voice, drawn from her career-spanning interviews and self-filmed home videos. It offers a personal glimpse into her reclusive later years, showcasing her garden (tended by Roberto de Carvalho), miniature collection, paintings, pet marmosets, dog, and cats. The film quickly became the most-viewed Brazilian documentary in cinemas for the year, surpassing 50,000 admissions.

== Legacy ==
By refusing to remain confined to rock and venturing into other rhythms such as samba, pop, and disco music, Rita broadened the horizons of her original genre and expanded her popular reach. She composed indispensable songs in Brazilian music that helped revolutionize the national pop scene. Her output featured countless gems with sophisticated arrangements and lyrics that were still accessible enough to captivate the general public. […] The greatest irony is that the once-transgressive Rita no longer provoked fear or anger, but widespread excitement: her audience ranged from grandmothers to grandchildren. She was signed by Som Livre and, coinciding with the golden age of telenovelas, her songs appeared in practically every Globo production.

— Assessment by Felipe Branco Cruz, of Veja magazine, on the impact of Lee.

Lee is widely regarded as one of the most influential and successful Brazilian female artists of all time, and several journalists, music critics, and academics have highlighted her legacy. Manuel Abud, president and CEO of the Latin Recording Academy, described her as "a visionary artist whose singular sound identity blends her rock and psychedelic vein with pop, carnival, bossa nova and Latin elements. […] Her music transcends generations and serves as an inspiration for music creators around the world." Thales de Menezes of Folha de S.Paulo wrote that she was fundamental to the development of rock in Brazil, emerging during a troubled period when the genre was viewed as a "cultural villain" by many leading figures in Brazilian music and arts. Editors of the blog Ao Redor noted that "rock found in Lee a voice that echoes freedom, innovation and resistance. She not only adapted rock to the Brazilian cultural scene but also enriched it with her own influences and perspectives."

Alexandre Figueirôa of O Grito! pushed back against the "Queen of Rock" label, arguing that she represented the opposite: "she was 'roque enrow' itself, the black sheep of the family, rebellious, irreverent, and never one to hold back when she had the chance to deliver sharp jabs at square-mindedness." Pedro Ibarra of Correio Braziliense wrote that she "not only illuminated national rock but the entire musical, philosophical and behavioral scene of the country" and that "Rita Lee Jones is gone, but her work remains as a legacy and reference for many generations who will be influenced by her voice and feminist militancy."

In the pop sphere, Isabela Pétala of Billboard Brasil called Lee the "first popstar of Brazil." The partnership with Carvalho introduced the style to the country and executed it with international-level mastery. As Amauri Arrais wrote for BBC News Brasil:

"The end of house arrest and of Tutti Frutti, shortly afterward, led the couple to begin the partnership that established her as a popular artist, stringing together one success after another while blurring the boundaries between rock and pop for good."

As André Barcinski recalled in his 2014 book Pavões misteriosos 1974–1983: a explosão da música pop no Brasil, even her earlier work with Os Mutantes and Tutti Frutti had not brought mainstream chart success outside the rock niche. Professor Naira Marcatto observed that few musicians have built a body of work that has "remained almost untouched by the passage of time," noting that even more than a decade after she retired, very young artists continue to listen to, sing, play, and study her songs with immense identification. Leonardo Torres of Popline described her as the "favorite singer of female pop" and a key reference for artists such as Anitta, Paula Toller, Daniela Mercury, Duda Beat, and Ana Caetano of Anavitória. She also inspired male rock figures, including Renato Russo of Legião Urbana and Cazuza of Barão Vermelho, both of whom wrote songs in her honor.

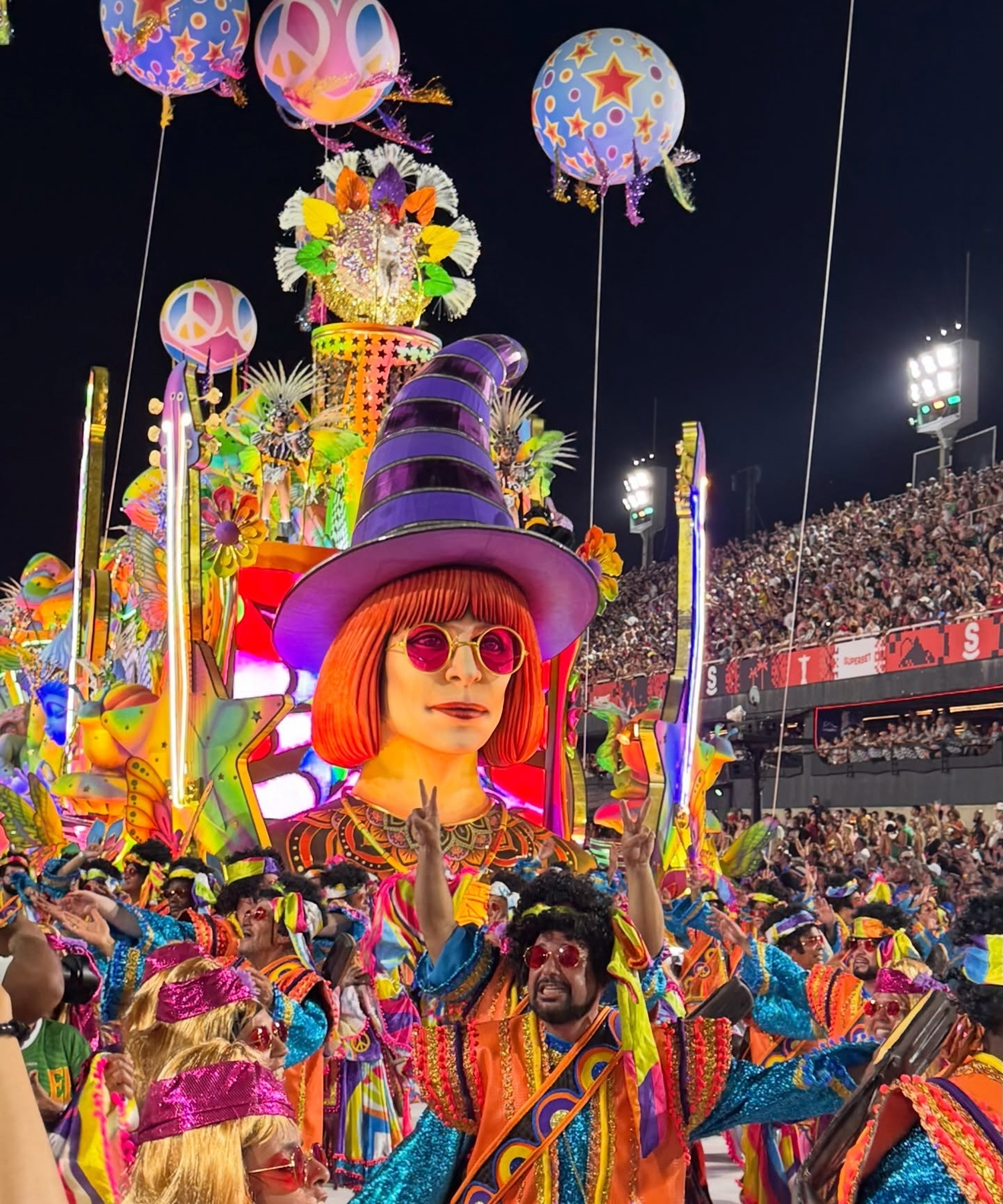
Sculpture in homage to Lee by the Mocidade Independente de Padre Miguel samba school, during the Rio Carnival.

Lee's songwriting brought new perspectives to Brazilian popular music. As documented by Jéssica Rodrigues Araújo Cunha, her lyrics demonstrated that "sex can be sought by women for the purpose of pleasure," challenging the prevailing morality around sex and women in Brazilian society. José Antônio Barbosa noted that songs such as "Mania de você" (1979) addressed love, marital relations, and sexual desire in a direct and unprecedented way for a female Brazilian singer-songwriter. Feminist academic Ana Karla Marcelino described her as "a notable musical representative of the struggle against the dominant patriarchal ideology," citing tracks like "Elvira Pagã" as examples of her critique of female stereotypes.

Artists influenced by Lee include Marisa Monte, Paula Lima, Preta Gil, Ana Carolina, Maria Rita, Zezé Motta, Cássia Eller, Claudia Leitte, Wanessa Camargo, Julia Mestre, Fernanda Takai, Badi Assad, Larissa Manoela, Iza, Adriana Calcanhoto, Paulo Ricardo, Catto, Dinho Ouro Preto, Titãs, and Chitãozinho & Xororó.

=== Relation with São Paulo ===
Lee was born and raised in the Vila Mariana neighbourhood of São Paulo's South Zone, where she lived until age 19 in a large house on Rua Joaquim Távora. She often described the area as holding her fondest memories. During her youth she explored the city extensively—from Rua Augusta and Ibirapuera Park to Pacaembu Stadium and Interlagos—places that frequently appeared in her songs. In "Mania de Você", performed live in São Paulo, she sang "Sampa, você me dá água na boca" ("Sampa, you make my mouth water"), expressing her affection for the metropolis. For a time she lived in the Serra da Cantareira, attempting a hippie commune with her sisters.

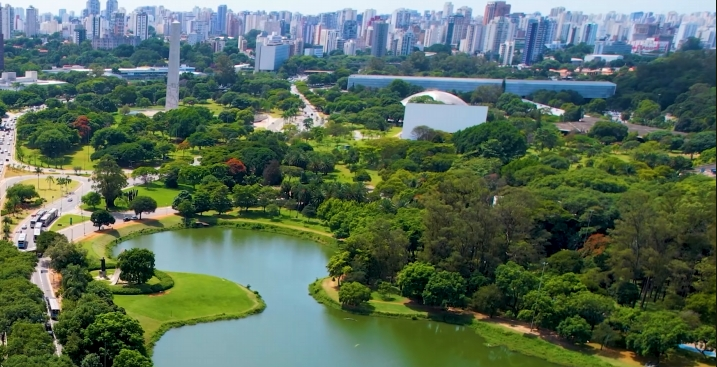
Frequently mentioned in her songs, Ibirapuera Park has a square named in honor of Lee.

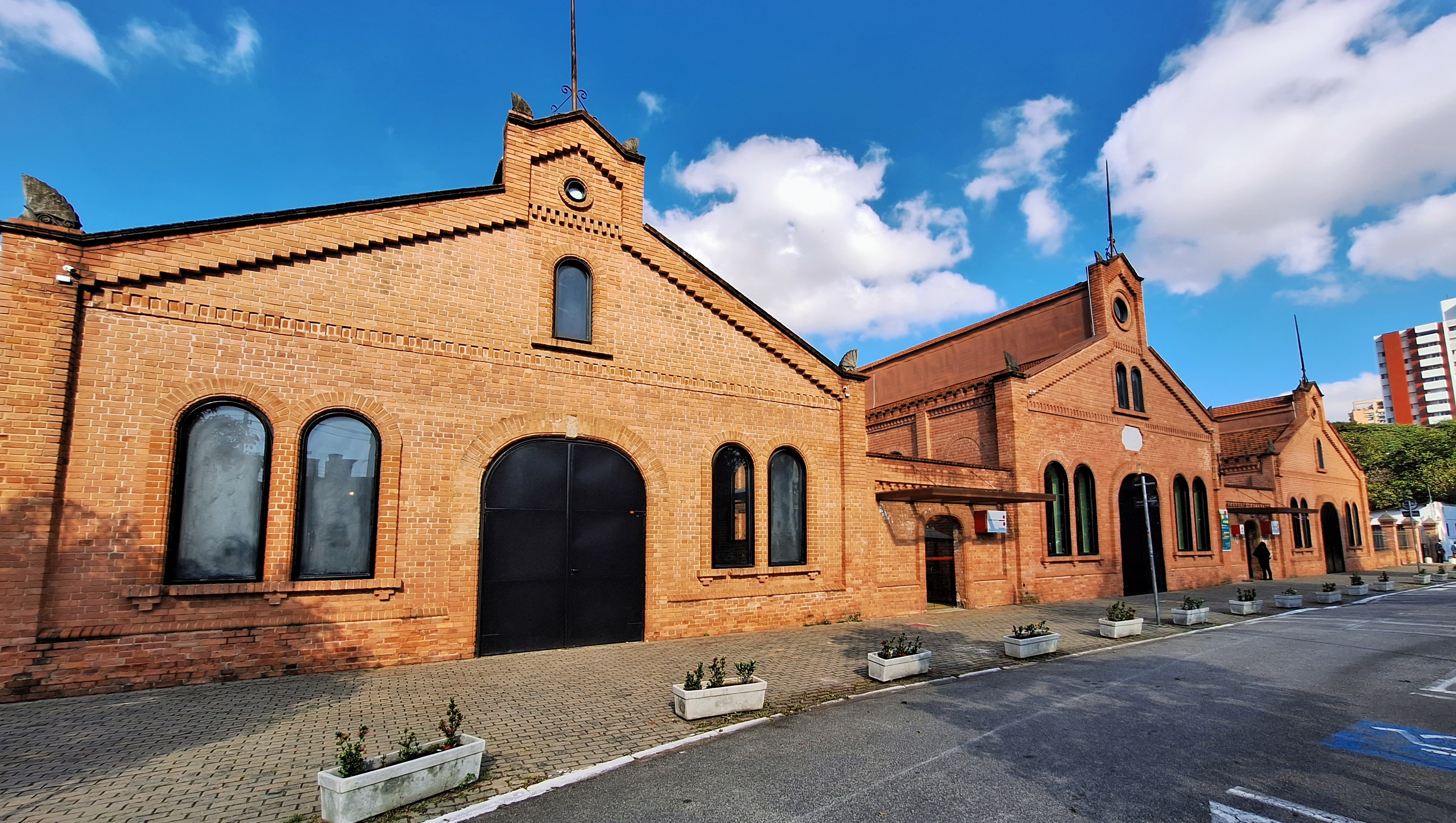
In the Vila Mariana district, Lee grew up and lived until she was 19; it was also there that she was arrested during the Brazilian military dictatorship.

Lee also resided in Pompeia, where Os Mutantes formed on Rua Venâncio Aires; the neighbourhood is referenced in "Ôrra Meu" ("I grab the guitar and won't let go until Pompeia screams"). Other São Paulo-inspired songs include "Caminhante noturno" (1969), "José" (1972), "Lá vou eu" (1976), "Lady Babel" (1976), "Vírus do amor" (1985), "Vítima" (1985), "Gloria F" (1985), "Brazix muamba" (1987), "Venha até São Paulo" (1993), and "Santa Rita de Sampa" (1997), evoking landmarks such as Largo do Arouche, Liberdade, Praça da Sé, the Tietê River, Sport Club Corinthians Paulista, and Viaduto do Chá.

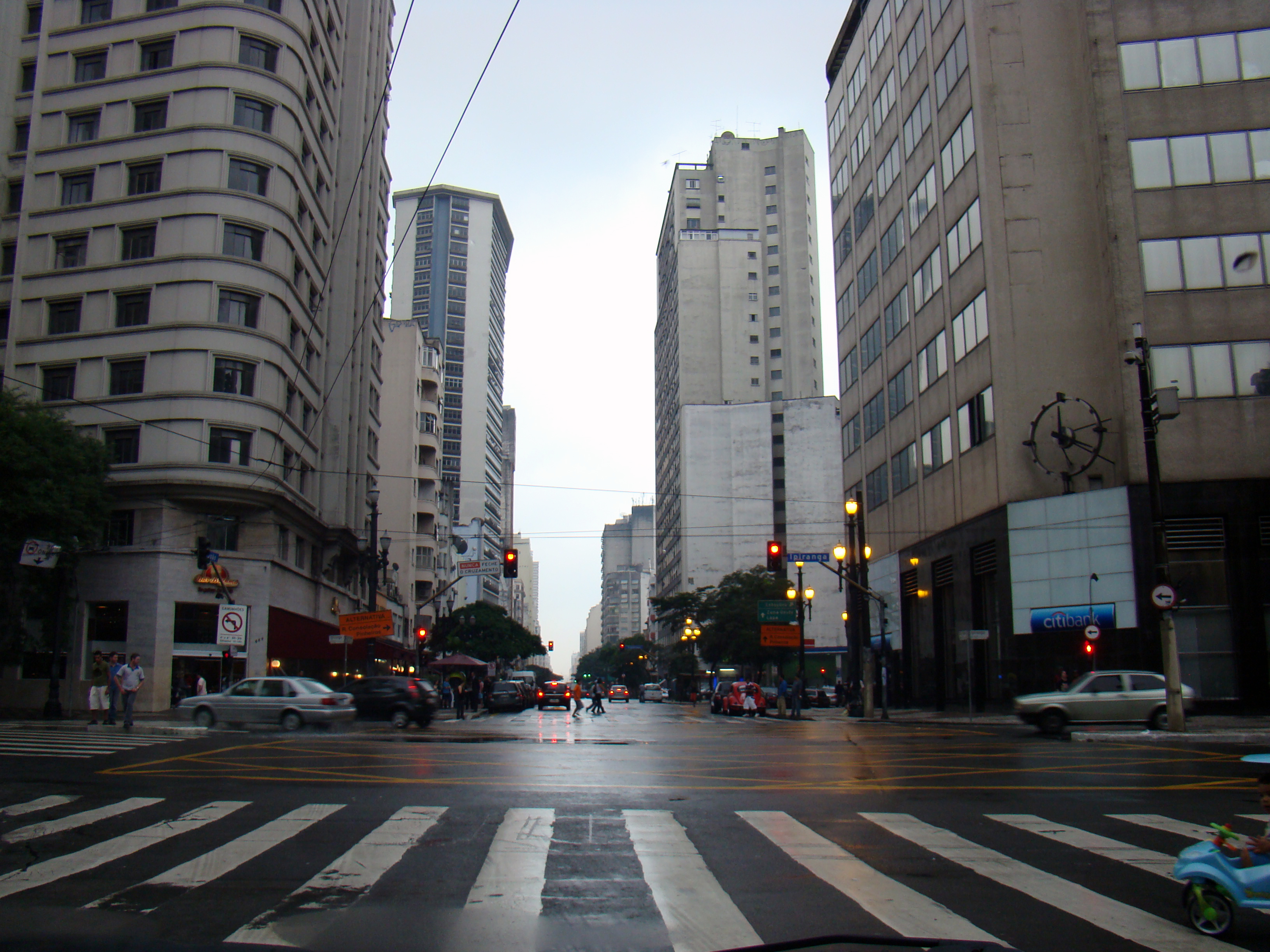
Avenida São João × Avenida Ipiranga, immortalised in Veloso's song "Sampa", in which he calls Lee "the most complete translation" of the city.

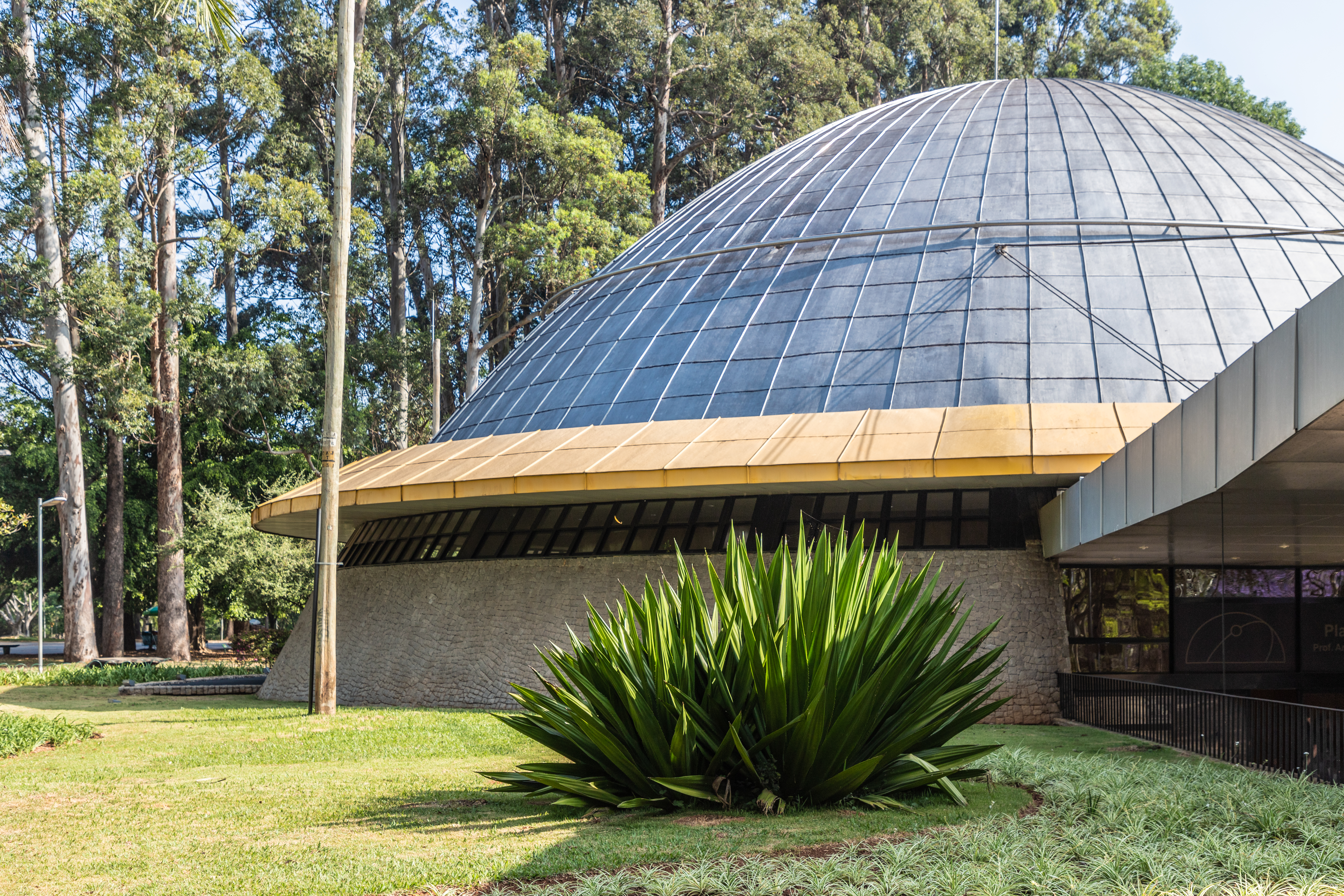
Professor Aristóteles Orsini Planetarium, located in Ibirapuera Park, where her wake was held.

In April 2000 her dog Mike went missing in Jardim São Bento; Lee made an emotional on-air plea on SBT's Domingo Legal with Gugu Liberato, offering a reward and appearing on Programa do Jô, Pânico, Transamérica radio, and 89 FM. Musician Leandro Lehart, a neighbour, found and returned the pet, an episode that garnered widespread media attention and highlighted São Paulo's community spirit.

In January 2013, during her 50th-anniversary tour at a Vale do Anhangabaú concert for the city's 459th birthday, Lee performed wrapped in the São Paulo flag, declaring: "I love this city. I've lived here for 67 years! I'm not leaving... If it weren't for São Paulo, Brazil would be much less." Caetano Veloso immortalised her as "the most complete translation" of the city in his song "Sampa", and she was affectionately dubbed "Saint Rita of Sampa".

Lee's legacy in São Paulo endures through a 2023 mural by artists Paulo Terra, Pedro Terra, and Eraldo Moura (Gê Moura) on Avenida Domingos de Morais in Vila Mariana, depicting two phases of her career. She died on 8 May 2023, and her public wake was held on 10 May at the Professor Aristóteles Orsini Planetarium in Ibirapuera Park—a venue she called her "enchanted forest" in her memoirs—drawing thousands of fans and celebrities.

In April 2024 a bill to rename Ibirapuera Park "Ibirapuera Park – Rita Lee" was amended; Mayor Ricardo Nunes signed legislation renaming the park's former Praça da Paz as "Praça da Paz – Rita Lee". In July 2024 the São Paulo City Council approved Law No. 18,151, establishing 22 May (the feast day of Saint Rita of Cascia, which Lee symbolically adopted as her "new birthday") as Rita Lee Day.

== Achievements ==
Throughout her career, Lee received numerous awards and honors, accumulating 12 Brazilian Music Awards, three APCA Popular Music Awards, one APCA Literature Award, two Latin Grammys, three Troféu Imprensa awards, and the 1996 Shell Music Award—becoming the first woman to receive that honor. She was also awarded the Brazilian Order of Cultural Merit (2003) and the Order of Rio Branco (2023), both in the rank of Commander.

Known as the "Queen of Brazilian Rock", Lee stood out as the best-selling female Brazilian artist of all time, with more than 55 million units sold. This achievement placed her fourth on the overall list of best-selling Brazilian artists, behind only Roberto Carlos, Nelson Gonçalves, and Tonico & Tinoco. Her songs ranked among the most played on Brazilian radio for two consecutive decades: "Arrombou a festa" appeared on the list of the 100 most played songs of the 1970s, while "Baila comigo", "Banho de espuma", "Saúde", and "Lança-perfume"—in that order—stood out in the 1980s. During the latter decade, she ranked among the seven most played artists in the country. In addition, she holds the record for the greatest number of participations in Brazilian telenovela soundtracks, with more than 70 appearances, and was the first Brazilian artist to undertake an entire season of shows exclusively in gymnasiums and stadiums.

The album Fruto Proibido (1975) was included among the "100 Greatest Brazilian Music Records" by Rolling Stone Brasil and among the Best Latin American Rock Albums by the US edition of the magazine, ranking 16th on the first list and 41st on the second. In the same publication, Lee ranked 15th among the "100 Greatest Brazilian Music Artists", placing second among women, behind only Elis Regina—a similar position on Revista Bula's list of the "31 Greatest Brazilian Artists of All Time". She was also selected among the "100 Greatest Voices" in the country by Rolling Stone Brasil, and the song "Ovelha negra" appeared among the "100 Greatest Brazilian Songs". On that list, Lee is credited as composer of three additional tracks—"Ando meio desligado", "Balada do louco", and "2001"—released during her time with Os Mutantes. In O Globo's list of the "100 Greatest Brazilian Songs", the first two tracks appear, along with "Agora só falta você" and "Mania de você"—the latter ranking 24th and standing as the highest-placed song by Lee on the list.

In the field of awards, she was the main honoree at editions of the Video Music Brasil (VMB), Sharp Music Awards, Multishow Brazilian Music Awards, Woman's Music Event Awards (WME), Melhores do Ano, and the Papagaio Social Communication Award. In 2016, she received the Grand Prize of the Critics at the APCA Popular Music Awards, in recognition of her career. In 2022, she was honored with the Lifetime Achievement Award at the Latin Grammy. One year after her death, in 2024, the duo she formed with Carvalho received an honorary award from the União Brasileira de Compositores (UBC) for musical excellence, recognizing their musical relevance and impact over three decades since the release of Mania de Você (1979). On that occasion, Carvalho delivered a speech and dedicated the award to Lee, stating that "in every small fragment of the universe there is a small piece of Rita, in all of us and in everything."

In 2024, the São Paulo City Council established 22 May as Rita Lee Day through Law No. 18,151, published in the Official Gazette. Her name was immortalized in Praça da Paz, in Parque Ibirapuera, which was renamed Praça da Paz – Rita Lee. In the city of Jandira, in the metropolitan region of São Paulo, a street in the Altos de Jandira neighborhood was named after her. In Rio de Janeiro, a park in Barra da Tijuca, integrated into the Olympic Park, was inaugurated in her honor. Also that year, Lee appeared on postage stamps issued by the Brazilian Postal Service alongside themes such as the bossa nova genre and COP30.

== Discography ==
- Build Up (1970)
- Hoje É o Primeiro Dia do Resto da Sua Vida (1972)
- Atrás do Porto Tem uma Cidade (1974; with Tutti Frutti)
- Fruto Proibido (1975; with Tutti Frutti)
- Entradas e Bandeiras (1976; with Tutti Frutti)
- Babilônia (1978; with Tutti Frutti)
- Rita Lee (1979)
- Rita Lee (1980)
- Saúde (1981)
- Rita Lee & Roberto de Carvalho (1982)
- Baila Conmigo (1983)
- Bombom (1983)
- Rita e Roberto (1985)
- Flerte Fatal (1987)
- Zona Zen (1988)
- Rita Lee & Roberto de Carvalho (1990)
- Rita Lee (1993)
- Santa Rita de Sampa (1997)
- 3001 (2000)
- Bossa 'n Beatles (2001)
- Balacobaco (2003)
- Reza (2012)

== Filmography ==
- The Amorous Ones (1969)
- Fogo e Paixão (1988)
- Better Days Ahead (1989)
- Tanta Estrela por Aí… (1992)
- Durval Discos (2002)
- Wood & Stock: Sexo, Orégano e Rock'n'Roll (2006)
- Uma Noite em 67 (2010)
- Tropicália (2012)
- Worms (2013)
- A Primeira Missa ou Tristes Tropeços, Enganos e Urucum (2014)

== Written works ==
- Dr. Alex (1986)
- Dr. Alex e os Reis de Angra (1988)
- Dr. Alex na Amazônia (1990)
- Dr. Alex e o Oráculo de Quartz (1992)
- Rita Lírica (1996)
- Storynhas (2013)
- Rita Lee: uma autobiografia (2016)
- Dropz (2017)
- FavoRita (2018)
- Amiga ursa: uma história triste, mas com final feliz (2019)
- Dr. Alex & Vovó Ritinha: uma aventura no espaço (2022)
- Rita Lee: outra autobiografia (2023)
- O mito do mito (2024)

== Tours ==
- Tutti Frutti (1973–74)
- Atrás do Porto Tem uma Cidade (1974–75; with Tutti Frutti)
- Fruto Proibido (1975–76; with Tutti Frutti)
- Entradas e Bandeiras (1976–77; with Tutti Frutti)
- Refestança (1977; with Gilberto Gil)
- Babilônia (1978; with Tutti Frutti)
- Rita Lee 79 (1979–80)
- Lança-perfume (1980–81)
- Saúde (1981)
- Rita Lee e Roberto Tour Brasil 83
- Rita Lee e Roberto Tour 87/88
- Bossa 'n' Roll (1991–92)
- Rita Lee & Banda (1993–95)
- A Marca da Zorra (1995–96)
- Santa Rita de Sampa (1997–98)
- Meio Desleegada (1998–99)
- 3001 (2000–01)
- Yê Yê Yê de Bamba (2002)
- Balacobaco (2004)
- Rita Lee (2006–2007)
- PicNic (2007–09)
- ETC... (2010–12)

== See also ==
- Rock in São Paulo
- List of best-selling Latin music artists
- List of best-selling music artists in Brazil

== Bibliography ==
- Lee, Rita (2016). Rita Lee: uma autobiografia (in Brazilian Portuguese). São Paulo: Globo Livros. ISBN 978-8525063304.
- Barcinski, André (2014). Pavões Misteriosos — 1974-1983: A explosão da música pop no Brasil (in Brazilian Portuguese). São Paulo: Editora Três Estrelas. ISBN 978-85-653-3929-2.
- Cunha, Jéssica de Rodrigues Araújo (2021). "Importância da Produção Musical de Rita Lee". Universidade Federal do Acre (in Brazilian Portuguese).
- Barbosa, José Antônio (2013). "As faces de Eva: o universo feminino no léxico de Rita Lee" (PDF). Universidade de São Paulo (in Brazilian Portuguese).
- Marcelino, Ana Karla (2019). "As mulheres de Rita: quebra de estereótipos femininos em letras de canções de Rita Lee". Universidade Estadual da Paraíba (in Brazilian Portuguese).
