= Rita Lee (1979 album) =

Studio album by Rita Lee
- Released: 1979
- Recorded: 1979
- Venue: São Paulo
- Genre: Pop rock, disco
- Length: 33:00
- Label: Som Livre
- Producer: Guto Graça Mello

Rita Lee chronology
Babilônia (1978)	Rita Lee (1979)	Rita Lee (1980)

Professional ratings
Review scores
Source	Rating
Allmusic	3/5 stars

Rita Lee is the third solo album by Rita Lee and her first following her split with Tutti Frutti, released in 1979.

Heavily influenced by the disco sound that was popular at the time, Rita Lee can be seen as a transitional album with Lee veering away from her signature stadium rock sound towards a more accessible mainstream sound. The album is noted for being the first of many collaborations to follow with her now husband, Roberto de Carvalho.

== Track listing ==
All tracks are written by Rita Lee and Roberto de Carvalho, except where noted.

Side A
No.	Title	Writer(s)	Length
1.	"Chega Mais"		3:50
2.	"Papai, Me Empresta o Carro"		3:08
3.	"Doce Vampiro"	Rita Lee	4:24
4.	"Corre-Corre"		4:40

Side B
No.	Title	Writer(s)	Length
5.	"Mania de Você"		4:51
6.	"Elvira Pagã"		3:17
7.	"Maria Mole"	Rita Lee, Guto Graça Mello	5:17
8.	"Arrombou a Festa II"	Rita Lee, Paulo Coelho	3:33

== Certifications and sales ==
Region	Certification	Certified units/sales
Brazil	—	800,000
