= 3001 (Rita Lee album) =

Studio album by Rita Lee
- Released: 2000
- Genre: Pop rock; electro-rock
- Length: 50:07:00
- Label: Universal
- Producer: Rita Lee, Roberto de Carvalho

Rita Lee chronology
Santa Rita de Sampa (1997)	3001 (2000)	Aqui, Ali, Em Qualquer Lugar (2001)

Singles from 3001
- 1. "Erva Venenosa" Released: 2000

3001 is the 29th album by Brazilian rock singer Rita Lee. Released in 2000, it featured a song written by Rita Lee in partnership with Tom Zé also named "3001".

== Background ==
Professional ratings
Review scores
Source	Rating
Allmusic	4/5 stars

Electronic and psychedelic, the song "3001" that gave the album its title, was the result of a partnership between Rita Lee and Tom Zé. They had met at a MTV Brasil show that brought together some of the Tropicalistas on stage. In the occasion she asked Tom to write lyrics that would be a continuation of "2001", recorded by Os Mutantes in the 1960s.

Considered a "musical time machine", 3001 was named "Best Rock Album" at the Grammy Latino 2001.

== Tour ==
The 3001 Tour was full of novelty. Songs were included that were out of the repertoire in concerts. The old hits were not left out, however. According to the singer:

"There are songs that have almost never been played live, some pearls like the Side B of all the discs I've recorded over these 33 years in the road, that were often overshadowed by the songs that were successes, as "O Futuro me Absolve", from the Tutti Frutti era - a really nice song with very up-to-date lyrics, that I never had the chance to sing live. I understand that the public also likes to hear the hits, and we'll do some of them, with brand new arrangements."

The show also became a special year-end on Brazilian channel Rede Bandeirantes. The show had several hits from the new album: "Você Vem", "Erva Venenosa" and "O Amor Em Pedaços". The 3001 special featured the participation of Caetano Veloso, Zélia Duncan, Pato Fu and Paula Toller.

== Track listing ==
No.	Title	Writer(s)	Length
1.	"3001"	Rita Lee, Roberto de Carvalho, Tom Zé	5:26
2.	"2001"	Lee, Tom Zé	4:30
3.	"Você Vem"	Lee, Carvalho	4:29
4.	"Erva Venenosa (Poison Ivy)"	Jerry Leiber and Mike Stoller, Rossini Pinto (version)	3:58
5.	"Mentiras"	Carvalho	3:20
6.	"Rebeldade"	Lee, Beto Lee	2:39
7.	"Pagu" (featuring Zélia Duncan)	Lee, Zélia Duncan	3:54
8.	"O Amor Em Pedaços" (featuring John and Fernanda Takai)	Fernanda Takai, John	4:15
9.	"Cobra"	Lee, Carvalho	4:35
10.	"Entre Sem Bater"	Lee	3:59
11.	"Aviso aos Meliantes"	Itamar Assumpção, Carvalho	4:38
12.	"História Sem Fim"	Lee, Carvalho	4:21

== Certification ==
Region	Certification	Certified units/sales
Brazil (Pro-Música Brasil)	Gold	100,000^{*}
^{*} Sales figures based on certification alone.
