= Santa Rita de Sampa =

Studio album by Rita Lee
- Released: September 4, 1997
- Genre: Rock
- Label: Universal Music

Rita Lee chronology
Todas as Mulheres do Mundo (1993)	Santa Rita de Sampa (1997)	3001 (2000)

Professional ratings
Review scores
Source	Rating
Allmusic	4/5 stars

Santa Rita de Sampa is an album released by Brazilian singer Rita Lee, on September 4, 1997 by Universal Music. This album marked the return of Rita Lee, after a while recovering from a domestic accident.

== Track listing ==
No.	Title	Writer(s)	Length
1.	"Santa Rita de Sampa"	Lee, Carvalho
2.	"Normal em Curitiba"	Lee, Carvalho
3.	"Fruta Madura"	Lee, Carvalho
4.	"O Que Você Quer"	Carvalho, Arnaldo Antunes
5.	"Jardim de Allah"	Lee, Mathilda Kovack
6.	"Ando Jururu" (featuring Raimundos)	Lee
7.	"Tum Tum" (featuring Guinga)	Lee, Carvalho
8.	"Longe Daqui, Aqui Mesmo"	Lee, Carvalho
9.	"Homem Vinho"	Lee, Carvalho
10.	"Dona Doida"	Lee, Carvalho
11.	"Obrigado Não"	Lee, Carvalho
12.	"Menino de Braçanã"	Luiz Vieira, Arnaldo Passos
