= Rita Lee (1993 album) =

Todas as Mulheres do Mundo

Studio album by Rita Lee
- Released: 1993
- Genre: Rock
- Label: Som Livre

Rita Lee chronology
Rita Lee e Roberto de Carvalho (1990)	Todas as Mulheres do Mundo (1993)	Santa Rita de Sampa (1997)

Todas as Mulheres do Mundo, also known simply as Rita Lee, is an album by Brazilian singer Rita Lee, released in 1993 through Som Livre.

== Track listing ==
No.	Title	Writer(s)	Length
1.	"Filho Meu"	Rita Lee
2.	"Tataratlantes"	Lee, Mathilda Kovak
3.	"Drag Queen"	Lee, Antonio Bivar
4.	"Mon Amour"	Lee, Nalson Motta
5.	"Menopower"	Lee, Kovak
6.	"Maria Ninguém"	Carlos Lyra
7.	"Todas as Mulheres do Mundo"	Lee
8.	"Ambição"	Lee
9.	"Canaglia (Canaglia)"	Katina Ranieiri, Riz Ortolani
10.	"Benzadeusa"	Roberto de Carvalho, Rita Lee
11.	"Deprê"	Lee, Oswaldo Luiz
12.	"Só Vejo Azul"	Lee, Itamar Assumpção
13.	"Dami Mille Bacci"	Lee, Carlos Rennó
