= Babilônia (album) =

Studio album by Rita Lee & Tutti Frutti
- Released: 1978
- Recorded: 1978
- Studio: São Paulo, Brazil
- Genre: MPB, glam rock
- Label: Philips

Rita Lee & Tutti Frutti chronology
Entradas e Bandeiras (1976)	Babilônia (1978)	Rita Lee (1979)

Professional ratings
Review scores
Source	Rating
Allmusic	3/5 stars

Babilônia is the fourth and final album by Rita Lee & Tutti Frutti. It sold 150,000 copies.

== Track listing ==
Side one
No.	Title	Length
1.	"Miss Brasil 2000" (Rita Lee, Lee Marcucci)
2.	"Disco Voador" (Lee, Roberto de Carvalho)
3.	"Agora é Moda" (Lee, Marcucci)
4.	"Jardins da Babilônia" (Lee, Lee Marcucci)

Side two
No.	Title	Length
5.	"O Futuro Me Absolve" (Lee)
6.	"Sem Cerimônia" (Lee, Luis Sérgio Carlini)
7.	"Que Loucura" (Carlini)
8.	"Eu e Meu Gato" (Lee)
9.	"Modinha" (Lee)
