= Flerte Fatal =

Studio album by Rita Lee
- Released: 1987
- Genre: Brazilian rock, pop rock
- Label: EMI

Rita Lee chronology
Rita e Roberto (1985)	Flerte Fatal (1987)	Zona Zen (1988)

Flerte Fatal (in English: "Fatal Flirtation") is an album by Brazilian singer Rita Lee in partnership with her husband Roberto de Carvalho, released in 1987, the album features hits like "Pega Rapaz", "Bwana" and "Flerte Fatal"

Professional ratings
Review scores
Source	Rating
Allmusic	3/5 stars

== Track listing ==
1. "Brazix Muamba" (Roberto de Carvalho/Rita Lee)
2. "Flerte Fatal" (Rita Lee/Roberto de Carvalho)
3. "Bwana" (Rita Lee/Roberto de Carvalho)
4. "Me recuso" (Rita Lee/Luiz Sérgio Carlini/Lee Marcucci)
5. "Blue Moon" (Rodgers/Hart/Version: Rita Lee)
6. "Pega rapaz" (Rita Lee/Roberto de Carvalho)
7. "Músico Problema" (Rita Lee/Roberto de Carvalho)
8. "Pára com isso" (André Christovan/Roberto de Carvalho)
9. "Piccola Marina" (Roberto de Carvalho/Antonio Bivar)
10. "Xuxuzinho" (Rita Lee/Roberto de Carvalho)

== Sales ==
Sales for Flerte fatal
Region	Sales
Brazil	290,000
