= PublishNews =

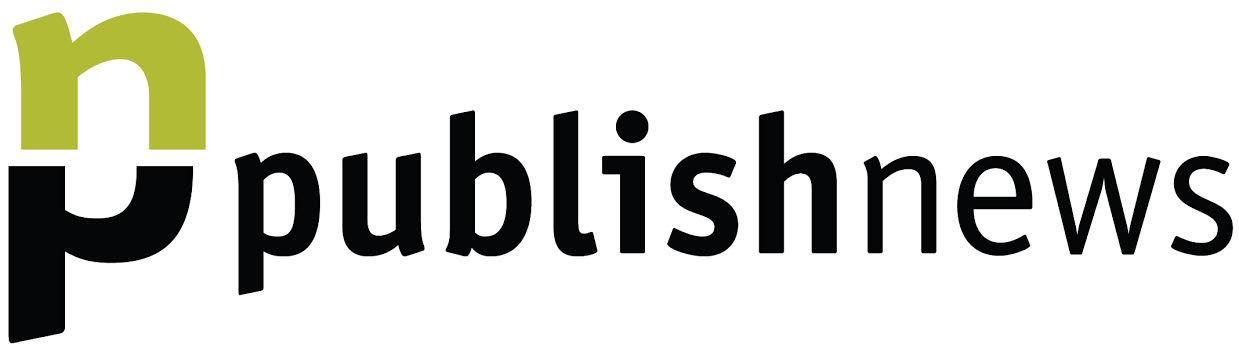
- Available in: Brazilian Portuguese
- Founded: 20 July 2001; 25 years ago
- Country of origin: Brazil
- Founder: Carlo Carrenho
- Editors: Ricardo Arcon (Executive Editor); Guilherme Sobota (Editor in Chief); Talita Facchini (Assistant Editor)
- Key people: Brisa Espinheira (Marketing analyst); Camila Veiga (Administrative-financing assistant)
- Industry: Publishing market
- Website: www.publishnews.com.br
- Current status: Active

PublishNews is a Brazilian portal considered a reference about the publishing market.

== History ==
PublishNews was created on 20 July 2001 by Carlo Carrenho as a daily newsletter for 30 of his friends from the publishing market. In 2009, the editors created their first website. In 2015, the website became a web portal.

== Bestseller list ==
Since 2010, PublishNews compiles a bestseller list. Differently from journals such as O Estado de S.Paulo, Folha de S.Paulo e O Globo, PublishNews list not only displays the books in order, but also the sum of the sales from all the consulted bookstores. The sellers send data from the 20 bestsellers from all the categories, but if a book overlaps more than one of them, it is counted only once. The ranking is published weekly and it is considered one of the most trustable from its category in Brazil.
