= Balacobaco =

Studio album by Rita Lee
- Released: 2003
- Recorded: 2003
- Genres: Pop rock, MPB
- Length: 44:19
- Label: EMI

Rita Lee chronology
Aqui, Ali, Em Qualquer Lugar (2001)	Balacobaco (2003)	Reza (2012)

Balacobaco is an album by Brazilian rock singer Rita Lee, It was released in 2003.

Professional ratings
Review scores
Source	Rating
Allmusic	4/5 stars

== Track listing ==
No.	Title	Writer(s)	Length
1.	"Amor e Sexo"	Rita Lee, Roberto de Carvalho, Arnaldo Jabor	3:39
2.	"A Fulana"	Lee, Carvalho	3:49
3.	"As Mina de Sampa"	Lee, Carvalho	3:41
4.	"Copacabana Boy"	Lee, Carvalho	3:46
5.	"Balacobaco"	Lee, Carvalho	4:36
6.	"Já Te Falei"	Carlinhos Brown, Arnaldo Antunes, Marisa Monte, Dadi	3:33
7.	"Nave Terra"	Lee, Carvalho	4:15
8.	"A Gripe do Amor"	Lee, Carvalho	4:18
9.	"Tudo Vira Bosta"	Moacyr Franco	3:43
10.	"Eu e Mim"	Lee, Carvalho	3:07
11.	"Over the Rainbow"	Harold Arlen, E.Y. Harburg	3:44
12.	"Hino dos Malucos"	Lee, Carvalho, Fernanda Young, Alexandre Machado	4:18

== Certifications and sales ==
Region	Certification	Certified units/sales
Brazil	—	550,000
