= Nelson Gonçalves =

Brazilian recording artist and singer

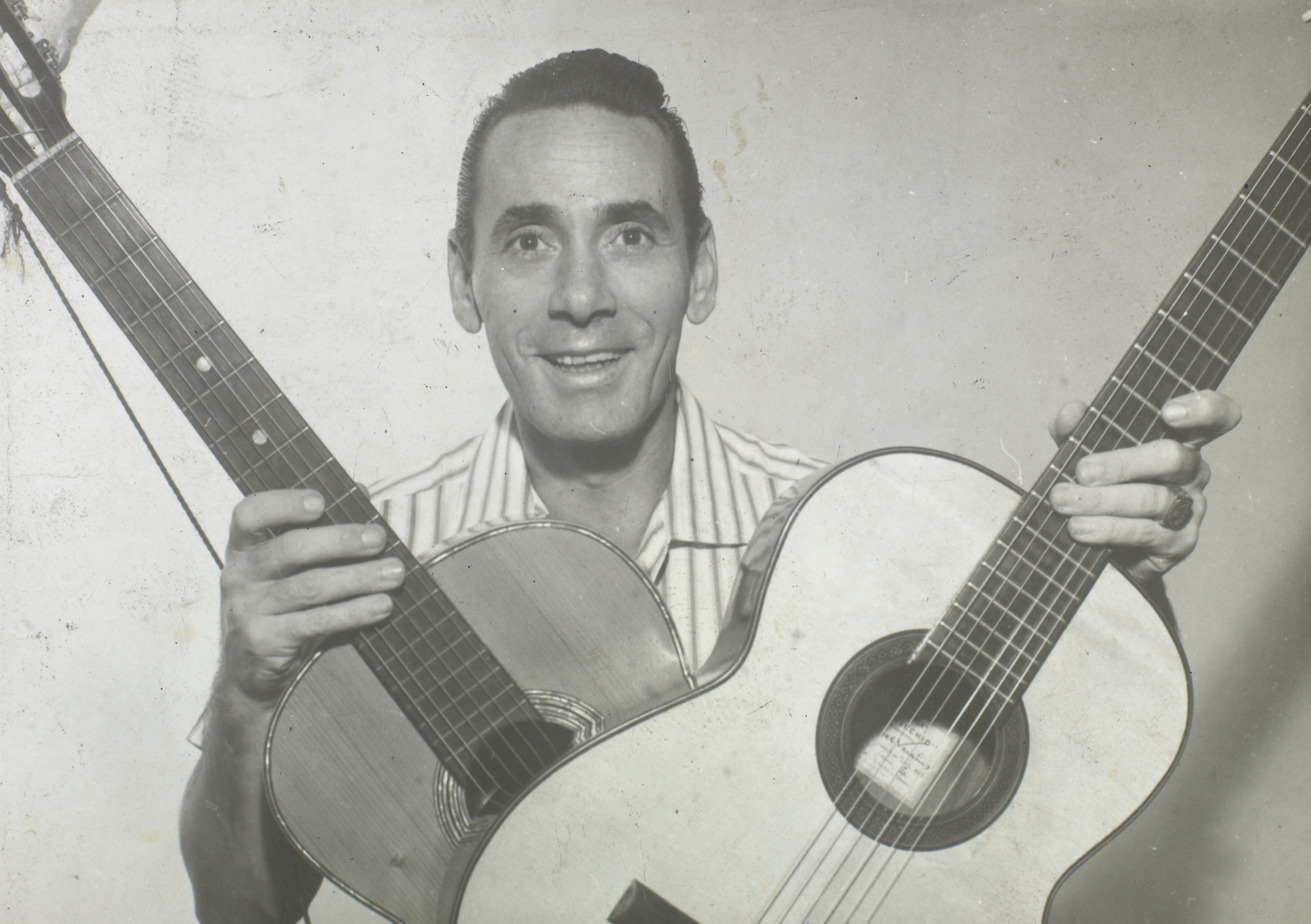
- Gonçalves, 1960

Background information
- Born: Antônio Gonçalves Sobral; June 21, 1919; Santana do Livramento, Rio Grande do Sul, Brazil
- Died: April 18, 1998 (aged 78) Rio de Janeiro, Brazil
- Genres: Samba, samba-canção
- Occupations: Singer, songwriter
- Instrument: Singer
- Years active: 1941–1998

Nelson Gonçalves (June 21, 1919 – April 18, 1998) was a Brazilian singer and songwriter.

Nelson Gonçalves collaborated with lyricist Adelino Moreira and recorded multiple albums. He gained an international following and appeared at venues such as Radio City Music Hall in New York City. Nelson sold more than 40 million albums.

== Early life ==
Born Antônio Gonçalves Sobral in Santana do Livramento, Rio Grande do Sul, he was raised in São Paulo. As a young man, he worked at a variety of menial jobs, including boxing, before embarking on a music career that made him one of the most popular Brazilian radio singers of the 1950s.

== Personal life ==
His personal life was sometimes filled with turmoil, and at one time, a cocaine addiction almost destroyed his career. Despite having an outstanding singing voice, he was known to have a stutter in his regular speech.

Nelson Gonçalves died of a heart attack at the age of 79 and was buried at Cemitério São João Batista in Rio de Janeiro.

== Legacy ==
In 2001, director Elizeu Ewald filmed a docu-drama about his life.

== See also ==
- List of best-selling Latin music artists
