= Aqui, Ali, em Qualquer Lugar =

Aqui, Ali, Em Qualquer Lugar or Bossa 'n Beatles

Studio album by Rita Lee
- Released: 2001
- Recorded: 2001
- Genres: Pop rock, MPB
- Label: EMI

Rita Lee chronology
Rita ReLEEda (2001)	Aqui, Ali, Em Qualquer Lugar or Bossa 'n Beatles (2001)	Balacobaco (2003)

Professional ratings
Review scores
Source	Rating
Allmusic	4.5/5 stars

Aqui, Ali, Em Qualquer Lugar also issued as Bossa 'n Beatles is a 2001 album by Brazilian rock singer Rita Lee. The album is composed of covers of the British band The Beatles.

== Track listing ==
1. "A Hard Day's Night"
2. "With a Little Help from My Friends"
3. "Pra Você Eu Digo Sim" (If I Fell)
4. "All My Loving"
5. "Minha Vida" (In My Life)
6. "She Loves You"
7. "Michelle"
8. "Aqui, Ali, Em Qualquer Lugar" (Here, There and Everywhere)
9. "I Want to Hold Your Hand"
10. "Tudo Por Amor" (Can't Buy Me Love)
11. "Lucy in the Sky with Diamonds"
12. "Here, There and Everywhere" [*]
13. "In My Life" [*]
14. "If I Fell" [*]

== Certifications and sales ==
Region	Certification	Certified units/sales
Brazil (Pro-Música Brasil)	Gold	250,000
