= Tonico & Tinoco =

Brazilian sertanejo duo

- Origin: Brazil
- Genre: Sertanejo
- Occupation: Singers
- Years active: 1935–1994
- Members: Tonico (João Salvador Perez); Tinoco (José Salvador Perez)

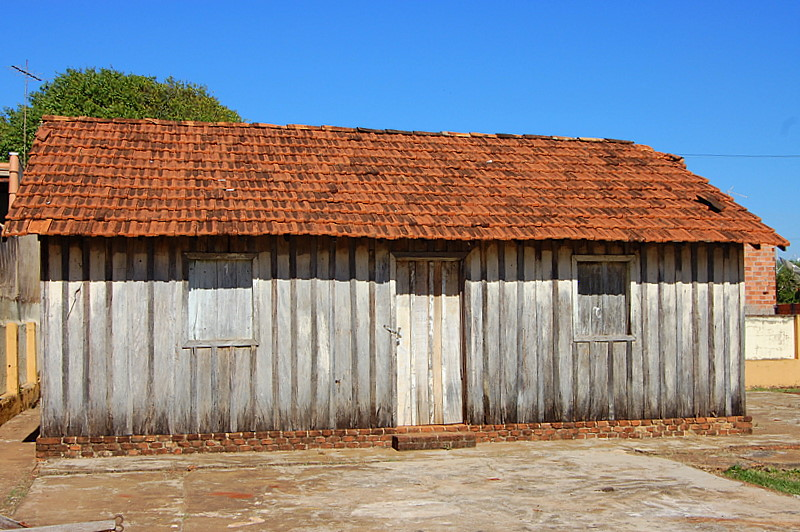
The house where Tonico and Tinoco spent their early childhood years.

Tonico e Tinoco were a Brazilian música sertaneja duo from the state of São Paulo, composed of brothers Tonico (João Salvador Perez, March 2, 1917 – August 13, 1994) and Tinoco (José Perez, November 19, 1920 – May 4, 2012), they are regarded among the most famous and prolific artists in sertanejo. With their first hit single, "Chico Mineiro" (1946), they were named "A Dupla Coração do Brasil" ("The Brazilian Heart Duo"). They performed more than 40,000 times between 1935 and 1994, recorded more than 1,000 songs and sold over 50 million albums despite never performing outside of Brazil.

== History ==
=== Early life and musical beginnings ===
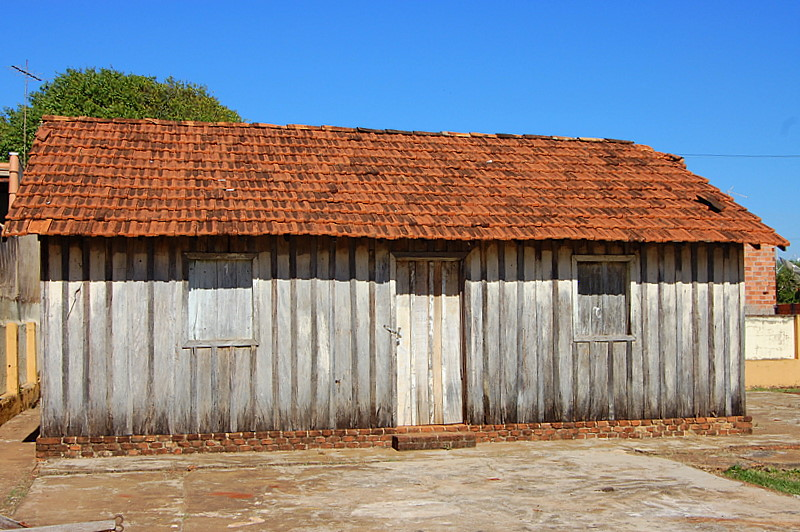
House in which Tonico & Tinoco lived in their early childhood, in Pratânia.

Born in rural São Paulo to Spanish father Salvador Pérez and Brazilian mother Maria do Carmo, João and José Perez's passion for music came from their maternal grandparents Olegario and Isabel, who played songs on an old accordion. The brothers quickly began to learn and play songs and had their first concert on August 15, 1935. Along with their cousin Miguel, the brothers performed as Trio da Roça. The trio became known locally via radio broadcasts.

In 1937 the Pérez family relocated the city of Sorocaba, São Paulo. Tonico took up work in a quarry and cement factory while Tinoco turned to shining shoes and highway construction during Brazil's economic crisis and the onset of World War II. With city life proving unbearable, the family returned to farming in the countryside. By now the Perez brothers were performing as a duo, and their return to their rural home afforded them opportunity to perform live on the radio while they continued to travel to the city on Sundays to pick up extra work. Traveling back and forth between São Paulo's urban and rural areas helped the brothers to spread their music around the state, performing on the street, at festivals, entering contests and making appearances on many radio stations.

The duo made their recording debut on the Continental label in 1945 with the song "Em Vez de Me Agradecê" ("Instead of Thanking Me") the cateretê ". During the recording session, the brothers sang so loudly (as they did on the farm) that they overloaded and broke the microphone. The following year the duo broke through with the single "Chico Mineiro" making Tonico e Tinoco the most famous sertaneja duo in Brazil and making it possible for the brothers to buy a home for their family.

=== Later success ===
In 1961 Tonico and Tinoco made their cinematic debut in Eduardo Llorente film Lá no Meu Sertão, based on the life and work of the duo. While the film was in production, Tonico nearly died from tuberculosis and his brother Chiquinho filled in for him for both radio and studio appearances. Despite fears that Tonico would not be able to sing after surgery, the duo were soon performing again at full caliber.

In 1965 Eduardo Llorente featured the duo in another film, Obrigado à Matar, based on the legend of Chico Mineiro and the song of the same name that had made Tonico e Tinoco famous. Another film followed in 1969—A Marca da Ferradura (The Mark of the Horseshoe) by Nelson Teixeira Mendes and the following year the duo recorded a tribute album to Raul Torres which was completed two months after the singer died. Two less successful films—Llorente's Os Três Justiceiros (The Three Gunslingers) and Osvaldo de Oliveira's Luar do Sertão had the Perez brothers give up their acting career and focus solely on music.

On June 6, 1979, Tonico & Tinoco gave a three-hour concert for 2,500 people at the Municipal Theatre of São Paulo, a venue that had previously been used only for operas and ballets. In 1984, they returned to the screen as a cameo in Andrew Klotzel's A Marvada Carne.

== Deaths ==
Tonico & Tinoco's final concert was in Mato Grosso on August 7, 1994. Tonico died shortly thereafter. Tinoco continued to perform solo until his death on May 4, 2012, in São Paulo, due to complications after respiratory failure. He was 91 years old.

== Discography ==
=== Studio albums ===
- 1958: Suas Modas Sertanejas
- 1959: Na Beira da Tuia
- 1960: A Dupla Coração do Brasil
- 1961: A Saudade Vai
- 1962: La no Meu Sertão
- 1963: Cantando para o Brasil
- 1965: Data Feliz
- 1966: Artista de Circo
- 1966: Rancho de Palha
- 1969: Rei dos Pampas
- 1971: A Marca da Ferradura
- 1971: Laço de Amizade
- 1994: Coração do Brasil

=== Compilation albums ===
- 1968: As 12 Mais de Tonico e Tinoco
- 1983: Os Grandes Sucessos de Tonico e Tinoco

=== Singles ===
- Moreninha Linda
- Chico Mineiro
- O Gondoleiro do Amor
- Saudades de Ouro Preto
- Saudades do Matão
- Tristeza do Jeca
- Me Leva
- Ferreirinha
- Boiada Cuiabana
- Velho Pai
- Vingança de Soldado
- Mourão da Porteira
- Beijinho Doce
- As Três Cuiabanas
- Artista de Circo
- Faz um Ano "Hace um Año"
- Adeus Mariana
- O Caipira é Vosso Amigo
- Falsidade
- Rei dos Pampas
- Paraguaia
- Enquanto a Estrela Brilhar
- Luar do Sertão
- Chuá, Chuá
- Couro de Boi
- Maringá
- A Moda da Mula Preta
- Que Linda Morena
- Chico Mulato
- Mineirinha
- Pingo d´Água
- Segredo se Guarda
- Feijão Queimado
- Estrada da Vida
- Boiadeiro Apaixonado
- João Carreiro
- Cavalo Zaino
- Ciriema
- Baile em Ponta Porã
- Cavalo Preto
- Cidade Morena
- Orgulhosa
- Chalana
- Adeus Campina da Serra
- Moça Folgazona
- Azul Cor de Anil
- Rei do Volante
- Minas Gerais
- Boiadeiro Punho de Aço
- João de Barro
- Oi Vida Minha! (Moda do Peão)
- O Menino da Porteira
- Saudade que eu Tenho
- Boi Amarelinho
- As Flores
- Boa Noite Amor
- Mandamento do Motorista
- Pingo Preto
- Porquê
- Paineira Velha
- Lembranças
- Cavalo Branco
- Retalhos de Amor
- A Viagem do Tietê
- Lenda da Valsa dos Noivos
- Três Batidas na Porteira
- Praia Serena
- Motorista do Progresso
- Sorte Tirana
- Distante de Ti
- Adeus Gaúcha
- Filho de Mato Grosso
- Último Adeus
- Carreiro Sebastião
- Ranchinho de Taquara
- Saudades de Araraquara
- Teu Nome Tem Sete Letras
- Bombardeio
- Duas Cartas
- Fandango Mineiro
- Gaúcho Velho
- Fogo na Serra
- Decisão Cruel
- Encantos da Natureza
- Chão de Goiás
- Eu Penso em Ti
- Minha Mágoa
- Burro Picaço
- Chitãozinho e Xororó
- Piracicaba
- Cabocla Tereza
- Bom Jesus de Pirapora
- Canção da Criança
- Não Vou Brincar
- Estrela do Oriente
- Dia de Natal
- A Cuíca tá Roncando
- Anel de Noivado
- A Viola e o Cantador
- Cidade Grande
- Juriti Mineira
- Viola de Ouro
- Bate co Pé, Bate cá Mão
- La Paloma
- Velho Candieiro
- Arroz à Carreteiro
- Filho Pródigo
- Disparada
- Pinga Ni Mim
- No Meu Pé de Serra
- O Sanfoneiro só Tocava Isso
- Seresta
- Êh! São Paulo
- Felicidade
- A Mão do Tempo

== Discography in 78 RPM ==
No.	Side "A"	Side "B"	Label	Disk No.	Recording Date
1	Em vez de me agradecer		Continental	15.385	jul/45
2	Tudo tem no sertão	Porto Esperança	Continental	15.417	sep/45
3	Sertão do Laranjinha	Percorrendo meu Brasil	Continental	15.418	sep/45
4	Cuiabano	Moreninha	Continental	15.447	oct/45
5	Destino de Caboclo	Ai, meu bem	Continental	15.655	jun/46
6	Cortando Estradão	Chico Mineiro	Continental	15.681	aug/46
7	Pião Vaqueiro	Adeus, Morena Adeus	Continental	15.706	sep/46
8	A Cruz do Caminho	Tristeza do Jeca	Continental	15.795	jul/47
9	Boiadeiro Entrevado	Que Lucro dá!	Continental	15.796	jul/47
10	Você Sabe onde Moro	Destinos Iguais	Continental	15.819	aug/47
11	Vingança do Chico Mineiro	Goiana	Continental	15.913	sep/48
12	Desprezado	Rancho Vazio	Continental	16.026	apr/49
13	Besta Ruana	Adeus Rio Grande	Continental	16.092	sep/49
14	Camisa Preta	Morte da Caboclinha	Continental	16.114	dec/49
15	Violeiro Casado	Triste Também	Continental	16.165	apr/50
16	Canoeiro	Festa do Baiano	Continental	16.233	aug/50
17	Mão Criminosa	Adeus Fronteira	Continental	16.234	aug/50
18	Aparecida do Norte	Boiadeiro do Norte	Continental	16.348	mar/51
19	Castigo	Balancê	Continental	16.394	jun/51
20	A Morte do Dr. Laureano	Cuiabana	Continental	16.452	sep/51
21	Boi de Carro	A Morte do Canoeiro	Continental	16.466	dec/51
22	Rio Pequeno	Cabocla	Continental	16.519	apr/52
23	Flor Gaúcha	Rio Grande	Continental	16.526	apr/52
24	Paulista	Monumento Nacional	Continental	16.581	jun/52
25	Paraíba	Sertaneja	Continental	16.596	jul/52
26	Carta	Casinha Branca	Continental	16.623	dec/52
27	Chico Viola Morreu	Jangadeiro	Continental	16.697	apr/53
28	Pião de Uberaba	Pé de Ipê	Continental	16.698	apr/53
29	Canto Pra Não Chorar	Adeus, Campina da Serra	Continental	16.751	jun/53
30	O Crime de Não Sabê Lê	Penacho	Continental	16.788	aug/53
31	Desengano	Dois Corações	Continental	16.834	oct/53
32	História de Minha Vida	Mãe, Sempre Mãe	Continental	16.841	oct/53
33	25 de Janeiro	Vem Depressa	Continental	16.859	nov/53
34	Lembrando Você	Lar Feliz	Continental	16.860	nov/53
35	Garimpo	Violão de Luto	Continental	16.902	mar/54
36	Irradiação	Filho do Carpinteiro	Continental	16.922	apr/54
37	Palhaço	Fim do Baile	Continental	16.962	may/54
38	Recado	Sonho	Continental	16.980	jul/54
39	Mágoa de Cantadô	Meu Recado	Continental	17.034	oct/54
40	Milagre do Amor	Adeus Bela	Continental	17.086	may/55
41	Eu e a Lua	Sereno da Madrugada	Continental	17.107	jul/55
42	Padre Lima de Tambaú	Três Fitas	Continental	17.135	sep/55
43	Geada	Facão de Penacho	Continental	17.176	oct/55
44	Maldita Cachaça	Aniversário de Casamento	Continental	17.250	mar/56
45	Ingratidão	Tô Chegando Agora	Continental	17.251	mar/56
46	Nós e o Destino	Bico de Pena	Continental	17.289	may/56
47	A Marca da Ferradura	Minas Gerais	Continental	17.292	jun/56
48	Amor de Artista	Velhas Cartas	Continental	17.340	sep/56
49	Meu Canário	As Duas Mães	Continental	17.366	dec/56
50	Papai Noel	Último Roubo	Continental	17.388	apr/57
51	Festa da Despedida	Minas Gerais	Continental	17.402	apr/57
52	Livro da Vida	Querer Bem	Continental	17.427	jun/57
53	Milagrosa Nossa Senhora	Tristeza do Jeca	Continental	17.459	aug/57
54	Exemplo da Fé	Justiça Divina	Continental	17.484	oct/57
55	Saudades do Matão	Saudades de Ouro Preto	Continental	17.531	apr/58
56	Princesa	Cana Verde	Continental	17.538	jun/58
57	Esquadrão Brasileiro	Amor Desprezado	Continental	17.581	oct/58
58	Pé da Letra	Padecimento	Continental	17.618	dec/58
59	Gaúcho	Recordando	Continental	17.630	feb/59
60	Noite de São João	Dois Morenos	Continental	17.668	may/59
61	Rei do Gado	Tempo de Amor	Caboclo	CS - 315	jun/59
62	Recordação de Gaúcho	Tirana	Caboclo	CS - 327	aug/59
63	Curitibana	Chora Morena	Caboclo	CS - 350	jun/60
64	O Gondoleiro do Amor	Triste Despedida	Caboclo	CS - 351	jun/60
65	Moreninha Linda	Boiada	Philips	61.022	jul/60
66	Véio Pai	Antiga Viola	Philips	61.023	jul/60
67	Desprezo	Me Leva	Caboclo	CS - 360	aug/60
68	Moreninha	Cabelo de Trança	Philips	61.046	sep/60
69	Lá no Sertão	Carro de Boi	Caboclo	CS - 393	nov/60
70	Triste Natal	Canta Moçada	Philips	61.059	dec/60
71	Caboclo	Marrueiro	Caboclo	CS - 411	may/61
72	Prece a São João	Mãezinha Querida	Philips	61.095	may/61
73	Paraguaia	Destinos Iguais	Caboclo	CS - 432	jun/61
74	Triste Coração	Sofrê Sozinho	Philips	61.111	jul/61
75	Amei	Meu Sertão	Caboclo	CS - 484	sep/61
76	Finado	Chofer de Caminhão	Philips	61.127	mar/62
77	Mourão da Porteira	Bandeira Paulista	Philips	61.138	jul/62
78	Sertão do Laranjinha	Besta Ruana	Caboclo	CS - 552	aug/62
79	Velho Carreiro	Paranaense	Caboclo	CS - 605	nov/62
80	Saudade	Ferreirinha	Caboclo	CS - 616	oct/63
81	Miss Universo	Arrasta-pé na Tuia	Caboclo	CS - 620	oct/63
82	Baianinha	Lágrimas do Céu	Caboclo	CS - 623	oct/63
83	Moda da Vida	Querência da Serra	Caboclo	CS - 630	nov/63
84	Saudade Vai	Carta de Caboclo	Caboclo	CS - 651	feb/64
