= Guto Graça Mello =

Brazilian music producer (1948–2026)

Guto Graça Mello (April 29, 1948 – May 5, 2026) was a Brazilian composer and music producer.

== Life and career ==
Mello was born in Rio de Janeiro on April 29, 1948. In 1967 he composed, with his childhood friend and music producer Mariozinho Rocha, the songs Manifesto, recorded by Elis Regina, and Cabra Macho, interpreted by Nara Leão. He set up the musical ensemble Vox Populi and performed in Mexico, where he spent three years. Subsequently, he was invited to compose the soundtrack of movie Missão: Matar.

At the invitation of Walter Clark, then general director of TV Globo, he was invited to work at the station. In the early 1970s he went to study at the University of California, Berkeley, where he moved with his family. Back in Brazil, he took over the musical direction of Globo, taking care of the orchestration of the soundtracks of telenovelas.

In the 1980s, Mello continued to produce the soundtracks of several Globo programs. He was one of those responsible along with Ezequiel Neves for the selection of the songs of TV Globo's children's specials, Pirlimpimpim and Plunct, Plact, Zuuum. In 1984, he was appointed music producer of the station. Guto Graça Mello moved away from television in 1989. He dedicated himself, for five years, exclusively to the composition and production of advertising jingles and theatrical pieces, soon after returning to work exclusively in the phonographic industry from two projects produced and recorded in secret, As Canções Que Você Fez pra Mim by Maria Bethânia and the third self-titled studio album by Cássia Eller, released, respectively, in 1993 and 1994, after which the producer worked a second time with Maria Bethânia and two other times with Roberto Carlos.

Mello died on May 5, 2026, at the age of 78.
