= Hot 20 =

Greatest hits album by João Penca e Seus Miquinhos Amestrados
- Released: 2000
- Genre: New wave, rockabilly, doo-wop, comedy rock, surf music, rock and roll
- Label: BMG

João Penca e Seus Miquinhos Amestrados chronology
A Festa dos Micos (1993)	Hot 20 (2000)

Hot 20 is a greatest hits album by Brazilian new wave band João Penca e Seus Miquinhos Amestrados, and the band's seventh and last release overall. It was released in 2000, 6 years after their first break-up, by now-defunct label BMG.

== Track listing ==
No.	Title	Original release	Length
1.	"Lágrimas de Crocodilo"	Okay My Gay (1986)	3:49
2.	"Popstar"	A Festa dos Micos (1993)	3:58
3.	"Romance em Alto-Mar"	A Festa dos Micos (1983)	3:45
4.	"Papa Uma-ma"	Cem Anos de Rock n' Roll (1990)	2:13
5.	"Como o Macaco Gosta de Banana"	A Festa dos Micos (1993)	4:10
6.	"O Monstro"	Cem Anos de Rock n' Roll (1990)	3:39
7.	"A Louca do Humaitá"	Além da Alienação (1988)	2:22
8.	"Suga-Suga"	Cem Anos de Rock n' Roll (1990)	3:40
9.	"Perdidos no Espaço"	Além da Alienação (1988)	4:21
10.	"Luau de Arromba"	Okay My Gay (1986)	4:18
11.	"O Superstar"	A Festa dos Micos (1993)	2:55
12.	"Sem Ilusões" (feat. Virginie Boutaud)	Além da Alienação (1988)	3:25
13.	"Calúnias (Telma, Eu Não Sou Gay)"	A Festa dos Micos (1993)	2:53
14.	"Matinê no Rian" (feat. Paula Toller)	Sucesso do Inconsciente (1989)	2:19
15.	"Sparring"	Além da Alienação (1988)	3:33
16.	"Banana Split"	Além da Alienação (1988)	2:47
17.	"Universotário"	Okay My Gay (1986)	2:21
18.	"Ricota"	Okay My Gay (1986)	2:46
19.	"Rock da Cachorra" (feat. Eduardo Dussek)	Cantando no Banheiro (1983)	3:11
20.	"Psicodelismo em Ipanema"	A Festa dos Micos (1993)	3:36

== Personnel ==
João Penca e Seus Miquinhos Amestrados

- Selvagem Big Abreu (Sérgio Ricardo Abreu) — vocals, electric guitar
- Avellar Love (Luís Carlos de Avellar Júnior) — vocals, bass
- Bob Gallo (Marcelo Ferreira Knudsen) — vocals, drums

Guest musicians

- Léo Jaime — guitars in "Rock da Cachorra"
- Eduardo Dussek — lead vocals in "Rock da Cachorra"
- Edgard Scandurra — guitars in "Ricota"
- Paula Toller — female vocals in "Matinê no Rian"
