= A Festa dos Micos =

Compilation album by João Penca e Seus Miquinhos Amestrados
- Released: 1993
- Genre: New wave, rockabilly, doo-wop, comedy rock, surf music, rock and roll
- Label: Leblon Records
- Producer: João Penca e Seus Miquinhos Amestrados

João Penca e Seus Miquinhos Amestrados chronology
Cem Anos de Rock n' Roll (1990)	A Festa dos Micos (1993)	Hot 20 (2000)

A Festa dos Micos (Portuguese for "The Party of the Apes") is a compilation album by Brazilian new wave band João Penca e Seus Miquinhos Amestrados. It was released in 1993 by Leblon Records. It was the band's last release prior to their break-up one year later.

The compilation contains some of the band's most famous hits, ranging from their 1983 debut album to their latest release, 1990's Cem Anos de Rock n' Roll, as well as some re-recordings and previously unreleased tracks.

== Background ==
The track "Rock da Cachorra" is not a song by João Penca themselves, but by Brazilian singer Eduardo Dussek in which João Penca only guest-appeared. It is originally present on Dussek's 1983 album Cantando no Banheiro.

"Como o Macaco Gosta de Banana" is a cover of the eponymous song by Portuguese singer-songwriter José Cid.

"O Superstar", one of the new songs by João Penca present on the compilation, is a Portuguese-language version of Neil Sedaka's "Breaking Up Is Hard to Do".

The album's opening track is a short piece influenced by Eumir Deodato's "Also Sprach Zarathustra (2001)", and its use as the album's first track alludes to the fact that Elvis Presley, one of João Penca's major influences, constantly used Richard Strauss' original version of the song as an opening fanfare to his shows in the 1970s.

== Track listing ==
Tracks in bold indicate they have been re-recorded and thus are different from their original release counterparts.

No.	Title	Original release	Length
1.	"Also sprach Zarathustra"	Previously unreleased	0:39
2.	"**Psicodelismo em Ipanema**"	Os Maiores Sucessos de João Penca e Seus Miquinhos Amestrados (1983)	3:36
3.	"Rock da Cachorra" (feat. Eduardo Dussek)	Cantando no Banheiro (1983)	3:11
4.	"Universotário"	Okay My Gay (1986)	2:21
5.	"O Superstar"	Previously unreleased	2:55
6.	"**Romance em Alto-Mar**"	Okay My Gay (1986)	3:45
7.	"**Calúnias (Telma, Eu Não Sou Gay)**"	Os Maiores Sucessos de João Penca e Seus Miquinhos Amestrados (1983)	2:53
8.	"Lágrimas de Crocodilo"	Okay My Gay (1986)	3:49
9.	"**Popstar**"	Okay My Gay (1986)	3:58
10.	"Como o Macaco Gosta de Banana"	Previously unreleased	4:10
11.	"S.O.S. Miquinhos (Merdley)"	Sucesso do Inconsciente (1989)	3:30
12.	"Matinê no Rian" (feat. Paula Toller)	Sucesso do Inconsciente (1989)	2:19
13.	"Papa Uma-ma"	Cem Anos de Rock n' Roll (1990)	2:13
14.	"Suga-Suga"	Cem Anos de Rock n' Roll (1990)	3:40
15.	"O Monstro"	Cem Anos de Rock n' Roll (1990)	3:39

== Personnel ==
João Penca e Seus Miquinhos Amestrados

- Selvagem Big Abreu (Sérgio Ricardo Abreu) — vocals, electric guitar
- Avellar Love (Luís Carlos de Avellar Júnior) — vocals, bass
- Bob Gallo (Marcelo Ferreira Knudsen) — vocals, drums

Guest musicians

- Léo Jaime — guitars in "Rock da Cachorra"
- Eduardo Dussek — lead vocals in "Rock da Cachorra"
- Paula Toller — female vocals in "Matinê no Rian"
