= Sentimental Education (disambiguation) =

Sentimental Education is an 1869 novel by Gustave Flaubert.

Sentimental Education may also refer to:

- A Sentimental Education (short stories) by Joyce Carol Oates, 1980
- Sentimental Education (Sneaky Feelings album), 1987
- Sentimental Education (Free Kitten album), 1997
- "Sentimental Education" (The Sopranos), an episode of the TV series The Sopranos
- Sentimental Education (film), a 1962 French film directed by Alexandre Astruc
- A Sentimental Education (Rod Jones album), 2010
- A Sentimental Education (Luna album), 2017
- Educação Sentimental, a 1985 album by Brazilian rock group Kid Abelha
  - "Educação Sentimental (songs)", two songs that serve as the title tracks to the album mentioned above
