= Sucesso do Inconsciente =

Studio album by João Penca e Seus Miquinhos Amestrados
- Released: 1989
- Genre: New wave, rockabilly, doo-wop, comedy rock, surf music, rock and roll
- Label: Esfinge
- Producer: Júnior Mendes, João Penca e Seus Miquinhos Amestrados

João Penca e Seus Miquinhos Amestrados chronology
Além da Alienação (1988)	Sucesso do Inconsciente (1989)	Cem Anos de Rock n' Roll (1990)

Sucesso do Inconsciente (Portuguese for "Success of the Unconscious") is the fourth studio album by Brazilian new wave band João Penca e Seus Miquinhos Amestrados. It was released in 1989 by independent label Esfinge.

The album spawned the hit single "Matinê no Rian", which would be used as the opening theme of the telenovela O Sexo dos Anjos. Paula Toller of Kid Abelha fame provides additional vocals for this track.

== Background ==
"Matinê no Rian" references the Cinema Rian, a famous now-defunct movie theater in Rio de Janeiro which was founded by then-First Lady of Brazil Nair de Tefé in 1932 and demolished in 1983.

"S.O.S. Miquinhos" is a medley (or, as João Penca puts it, "merdley", a portmanteau of "merda" — the Portuguese word for "shit" — and "medley") comprising the tracks "Namoradinha de um Amigo Meu" (a parody of Roberto Carlos' eponymous song), "Esperto É o Coqueiro", "Certo ou Errado", "Rua Augusta", "Vem Quente que Eu Estou Fervendo" and a cover of Christie's "Yellow River".

== Covers/parodies ==
Every João Penca album features Portuguese-language covers/parodies of old 1940s/1950s rock and roll/rockabilly and 1960s surf music songs.

"Johnny Pirou"

A parody of Chuck Berry's "Johnny B. Goode".

"O Monstro Macho"

A parody of Boris Pickett and the Crypt-Kickers' "Monster Mash".

== Track listing ==
No.	Title	Lyrics	Length
1.	"Menino Justiceiro" (Vigilante Boy)	Leandro Verdeal, Marcelo Elo	2:18
2.	"Larga Meu Pé" (Get Off Me)	Van Santos	3:32
3.	"A Surra" (The Whooping)	Van Santos	2:35
4.	"O Par" (The Pair)	Dodô Ferreira, Tony Wilson	2:23
5.	"Matinê no Rian" (A Matinée at the Rian — feat. Paula Toller)	Dodô Ferreira, Selvagem Big Abreu, Van Santos	2:19
6.	"O Velho Tubarão" (The Old Shark)	Dodô Ferreira, Tony Wilson	3:10
7.	"Johnny Pirou" (Johnny's Crazy)	Léo Jaime, Tavinho Paes	4:22
8.	"Cozinho de Noite" (I Cook at Night)	Arnaldo Baptista, Léo Jaime	2:20
9.	"O Monstro Macho" (The Macho Monster)	Avellar Love, Cláudio Killer, Selvagem Big Abreu	3:22
10.	"S.O.S. Miquinhos (Merdley)" I. "Namoradinha de um Amigo Meu" II. "Esperto É o Coqueiro" III. "Certo ou Errado" IV. "Rua Augusta" V. "Vem Quente que Eu Estou Fervendo" VI. "Yellow River"	Erasmo Carlos, Roberto Carlos ("Namoradinha de um Amigo Meu"); Selvagem Big Abreu, Van Santos ("Esperto É o Coqueiro"); Michael Sullivan, Paulo Massadas ("Certo ou Errado"); Hervé Cordovil ("Rua Augusta"); Carlos Imperial, Eduardo Araújo ("Vem Quente que Eu Estou Fervendo"); Jeff Christie ("Yellow River")	3:30

== Personnel ==
João Penca e Seus Miquinhos Amestrados

- Selvagem Big Abreu (Sérgio Ricardo Abreu) — vocals, electric guitar
- Avellar Love (Luís Carlos de Avellar Júnior) — vocals, bass
- Bob Gallo (Marcelo Ferreira Knudsen) — vocals, drums

Guest musicians

- Paula Toller — female vocals in "Matinê no Rian"
- Léo Jaime — vocals in "Namoradinha de um Amigo Meu"

Miscellaneous staff

- Júnior Mendes — production
