= Como Eu Quero =

Single by Kid Abelha

from the album Seu Espião
- Released: 1984
- Genre: Pop
- Length: 4:17
- Label: WEA Records
- Songwriter(s): Leoni, Paula Toller

"Como Eu Quero" (Portuguese for The way I want or How I want) is a pop song written and performed by Brazilian band Kid Abelha in their debut album Seu Espião (1984). It was released as the second single of the album and, after achieving enormous popularity in radio stations, it became widely known as one of the band's signature songs.

== Song information ==
Written by band members Leoni and Paula Toller, the lyrics of "Como Eu Quero" introduces the listener to a manipulative female character which tells a potential lover that she will only date him if he is able to change his personality, because this change will let her upgrade what she considers bad in him. According to Caetano Veloso, he wrote the hit "Não Enche" (Don't bother me) as a response to the manipulative character of "Como Eu Quero".

=== Weekly charts ===
Chart (1984)	Peak position
Brazil (ABPD)	1
