= João Penca e Seus Miquinhos Amestrados =

- Also known as: Zoo (1977–1982)
- Origin: Rio de Janeiro, Rio de Janeiro, Brazil
- Genres: New wave, rockabilly, doo-wop, comedy rock, surf music, rock and roll
- Years active: 1977–1994; 2007–2010
- Labels: Barclay Records, RCA Victor, RCA Ariola, BMG Ariola, Esfinge, Estúdio Eldorado.
- Past members: Selvagem Big Abreu; Avellar Love; Bob Gallo; Léo Jaime; Cláudio Killer

João Penca e Seus Miquinhos Amestrados (Portuguese for "João Penca [Banana-Bunch Joe] and His Tamed Apes"), commonly referred to as simply João Penca or J.P.M.A., were a Brazilian new wave band from Rio de Janeiro. Founded under the name Zoo, they were famous for their humorous, tongue-in-cheek lyrics filled with double entendres and innuendos which frequently parodied the tropes of 1950s rockabilly and 1960s surf music culture, and for their clothing heavily inspired by singers such as Elvis Presley and Chuck Berry.

Alongside the more famous Ultraje a Rigor and Mamonas Assassinas, they are considered to be pioneers of the comedy rock genre in Brazil.

== History ==
The band was formed in Rio de Janeiro in 1977 as "Zoo" by five friends who lived in the same building in the neighbourhood of Leblon: Sérgio Ricardo Abreu ("Selvagem Big Abreu"), Marcelo Ferreira Knudsen ("Bob Gallo") and his younger brother Cláudio "Killer" Knudsen, Luís Carlos de Avellar Júnior ("Avellar Love") and Léo Jaime. They began their career by opening shows for and collaborating with Eduardo Dussek, and in 1982 they changed their name to João Penca e Seus Miquinhos Amestrados.

Their debut album, Os Maiores Sucessos de João Penca e Seus Miquinhos Amestrados, came out in 1983 by Barclay Records; it was the only album of the band to feature Cláudio Killer, who died while taking a shower on December 1 of the same year, due to an accidental poisonous gas leakage in his apartment, and Léo Jaime, who left them in 1984 to pursue a solo career, since he felt his bandmates "were not taking the musical career as seriously as him". Os Maiores Sucessos... spawned the hit single "Edmundo", a Portuguese-language parody of Glenn Miller's "In the Mood", and counted with guest appearances by Ney Matogrosso, Lulu Santos and TV host Chacrinha. Also in 1983 they collaborated with Eduardo Dussek on his most famous song, "Rock da Cachorra", off his album Cantando no Banheiro. Their second album, Okay My Gay, came out in 1986 and contained some of the band's most famous songs, such as "Lágrimas de Crocodilo", "Popstar" (which would obtain higher fame after being covered by Lulu Santos in 2005), "Os Amantes Nunca Dizem Adeus" and "Sou Fã", with the latter two being Portuguese-language covers/adaptations of The Flamingos' "Lovers Never Say Goodbye" and The Crests' "16 Candles", respectively. It was also the band's most commercially successful album, selling over 250,000 copies.

In 1987, the band collaborated with their former member Léo Jaime on his song "Conquistador Barato", which was used as the opening theme of the telenovela Bambolê.

The band reached higher fame in 1989, when their song "Matinê no Rian", which featured a guest appearance by Kid Abelha's Paula Toller, and was used as the opening theme of the telenovela O Sexo dos Anjos. In the same year they also made a Portuguese-language parody of Bobby Pickett's famous song "Monster Mash", entitled "O Monstro Macho" ("The Macho Monster"). They also provided the opening theme of the children's show Milk Shake, which was broadcast by Rede Manchete and hosted by Angélica, lasting from 1988 to 1992. In 1990 they would cameo in and also contribute to the soundtracks of the films Lua de Cristal and O Escorpião Escarlate.

In 1991 their song "Suga-Suga" was used in the soundtrack of the telenovela Vamp, which lasted until 1992.

The band came to an end circa 1994, after the release of the compilation album A Festa dos Micos. They would return to active in 2007 however, contributing to the soundtrack of the telenovela Três Irmãs with a previously unreleased song – "Sol, Som, Surf e Sal", a Portuguese-language adaptation/translation of The Beach Boys' "Surfin' Safari". In 2008 they played at the Circo Voador and in Urca alongside Léo Jaime, and after some more venues they disbanded once more in 2010. A live DVD of their performance at the Circo Voador was scheduled to be released around this time, but it never materialized.

After the band's second and definitive end, its former members began pursuing other activities; Avellar Love began a career as a theater actor after working as a mechanical engineer alongside Bob Gallo, while Selvagem Big Abreu became a pedagogue in Tijuca. As of 2016 they occasionally appear alongside Léo Jaime on his shows though.

== Discography ==
=== Studio albums ===
- 1983: Os Maiores Sucessos de João Penca e Seus Miquinhos Amestrados
- 1986: Okay My Gay
- 1988: Além da Alienação
- 1989: Sucesso do Inconsciente
- 1990: Cem Anos de Rock n' Roll

=== Compilations ===
- 1993: A Festa dos Micos
- 2000: Hot 20

== Band members ==
- Selvagem Big Abreu (Sérgio Ricardo Abreu) – vocals, electric guitar (1977–1993, 2007–2010)
- Avellar Love (Luís Carlos de Avellar Júnior) – vocals, bass (1977–1993, 2007–2010)
- Bob Gallo (Marcelo Ferreira Knudsen) – vocals, drums (1977–1993, 2007–2010)
- Léo Jaime – electric guitar (1977–1984)
- Cláudio Killer – keyboards (1977–1983; died 1983)
