= Educação Sentimental =

Studio album by Kid Abelha
- Released: 1985
- Genre: Pop music, Brazilian rock
- Label: WEA

Kid Abelha chronology
Seu Espião (1984)	Educação Sentimental (1985)	Tomate (1987)

Educação Sentimental (English: Sentimental education) is the second studio album released by Brazilian pop music band Kid Abelha. It was originally released in 1985 by WEA and sparked some successful hits in Brazilian airplay such as "Lágrimas e Chuva", "Educação Sentimental (Parts I & II)", "Garotos" and "A Fórmula do Amor".

It was listed by Rolling Stone Brazil as one of the 100 best Brazilian albums in history.

== Track listing ==
1. "Lágrimas e Chuva" (Tears and Rain) (Leoni, Bruno Fortunato, George Israel) – 4:31
2. "Educação Sentimental (Part I)" (Sentimental Education, pt. I) (Leoni)
3. "Conspiração Internacional" (International Conspiracy) (Paula Toller, Leoni)
4. "Os Outros" (The Others) (Leoni)
5. "Amor por Retribuição" (Love Through Retribution) (Leoni, Israel)
6. "Educação Sentimetal (Part II)" (Sentimental Education, pt. II) (Leoni, Toller, Herbert Vianna) – 4:50
7. "Garotos" (Boys) (Leoni, Toller)
8. "Um Dia em Cem" (One Day Out of a Hundred) (Leoni, Toller)
9. "Uniformes" (Uniforms) (Leoni, Léo Jaime)
10. "A Fórmula do Amor" (The Formula of Love) (Leoni, Jaime) – 4:59
