= Antônio Luís von Hoonholtz =

Brazilian politician

Baron of Teffé
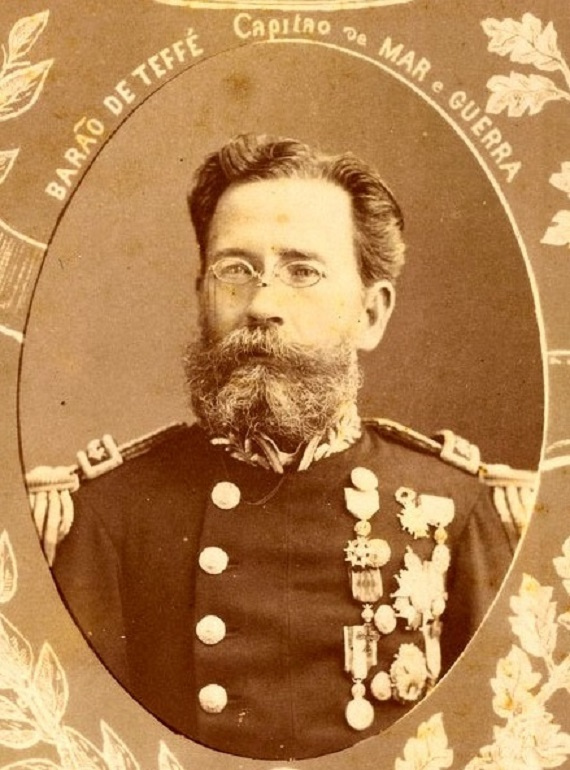
- Born: May 9, 1837; Itaguaí, Province of Rio de Janeiro, Empire of Brazil
- Died: February 6, 1931 (aged 93); Petrópolis, State of Rio de Janeiro, Brazil
- Children: Nair de Teffé
- Military career
- Allegiance: Empire of Brazil; First Brazilian Republic
- Branch: Imperial Brazilian Navy; Brazilian Navy
- Conflicts: Paraguayan War
- Coat of Arms of the Baron of Teffé

Antônio Luiz von Hoonholtz, Baron of Teffé (9 May 1837 – 6 February 1931), was a Brazilian admiral, senator, diplomat, writer, explorer and geographer.

== Biography ==
His father was Friedrich Wilhelm von Hoonholtz, a Prussian nobleman, lieutenant, mineralogist and engineer who emigrated to Brazil in 1824 as a mercenary of Emperor Pedro I, becoming later a successful businessman and a licensed captain of the Imperial Brazilian Army.

He was enrolled at the Naval School on 25 January 1852 and became a midshipman in 1854. In December 1858, he was promoted to second lieutenant and professor of the 4th year course at the Naval School. He was a precursor in hydrography and gave his first course in this subject at the Marine Academy of Rio de Janeiro in 1858. He then published the first treatise on hydrography in Portuguese.

During the Paraguayan War, commanding the gunboat Araguari, he was one of the heroes of the bombardment of Corrientes, occupied by the defenders of Paraguay. Then, on 11 June 1865, he won the officer's medal of the Imperial Order of the Cross for his actions in the naval battle of the Riachuelo. On 13 and 14 July 1865, in new battles, he managed to set fire to the Paraguayan steamer Paraguarí, which had run aground. On 28 November 1865, he chased the Paraguayan steamer Pira-Guirá, forced it to run aground and seized it.

He then explored the coasts of Brazil in the vicinity of Santa Catarina Island.

In 1871, he was entrusted with the delimitation of the borders between Brazil and Peru: leaving with his colleagues from Rio de Janeiro in October 1871, he travelled up the Amazon to beyond the Pongo de Manseriche, up the Huallaga river to the rapids in the foothills of the Andes, the Rio Negro and the Japurá River to the cataracts, then the Apaporis, the Madeira, the Purus, the Jutaí, the Putumayo and part of the Juruá rivers.

On 17 January 1874, the group entered the course of the Javary River. On 15 March 1874, they found the source and set the boundary marker between Peru and Brazil. He was the only Brazilian to return from this expedition in July 1874. Even his brother Carlos Guilherme von Hoonholtz who accompanied him died of beriberi. This expedition earned him the title of Baron of Teffé.

Promoted to rear-admiral, he led the Brazilian mission that observed the transit of Venus in front of the sun at Saint Thomas in the Caribbean Sea and at Punta Arenas in Patagonia in 1882. He founded the first geographical society in Rio and organised the hydrographic service of his country. In 1912, he was promoted to admiral.

He was also Brazil's minister plenipotentiary in Belgium, Italy and Austria and was elected senator for the state of Amazonas.

== Descent ==
He married Maria Luiza Dodsworth on 28 March 1868. From this marriage 4 children were born:

- Nair de Teffé von Hoonholtz, painter, singer and pianist, having been notably the first female cartoonist in the world. She was the founder of Cinema Rian in 1932. She married Marshal Hermes da Fonseca, being First Lady of Brazil from 1913 to 1914.
- Álvaro de Teffé von Hoonholtz, notary and Secretary (Minister) of the Civilian House of the Presidency of Brazil. He was the founder of the innovative magazine Revista da Semana in 1900. He married Maria Joaquina de Oliveira Murinelly (Nicola) and afterwards he married Tetrazzini de Almeida Nobre (Tetrá).
- Oscar de Teffé von Hoonholtz, Brazilian Ambassador. He married Maria Mercedes da Costa Pereira, daughter of the Count of Costa Pereira. His son Manuel de Teffé, became a Brazilian ambassador and race car driver. His grandson, son of Manuel, was the actor Anthony Steffen (1929–2004).
- Octávio de Teffé von Hoonholtz, diplomat and writer.

== Works ==
- Compendio de hydrographia: approvado e adoptado pelo Conselho de Instrucção da Escola de Marinha, com approvação do governo. Rio de Janeiro: Typographia Perseverança, 1864.
- Memórias do Almirante Barão de Teffé a Batalha Naval do Riachuelo: contada à família em carta íntima poucos dias depois d'esse feito pelo 1° Tenente Antônio Luiz von Hoonholtz. Rio de Janeiro: Garnier Irmãos, 1865.
- Arrasamento da laje submarina existente na entrada do Porto de Santos, Província de S. Paulo. Rio de Janeiro: Typographia Nacional, 1877.
- Relatorio dos trabalhos e estudos realizados na Bahia de Antonina. Rio de Janeiro: Typographia Nacional, 1877.
- Província do Paraná: demonstração da superioridade do caminho de ferro de Antonina a Curitiba perante o Instituto Polytechnico Brasileiro. Rio de Janeiro: Tipografia de G. Leuzinger & Filhos, 1879.
- Questão da abertura da Barra de Cabo Frio. Rio de Janeiro: J. De Oliveira, 1881.
- Defeza do Barão de Teffé na questão Cirne Lima. Manaus: Tipografia de Gregorio Joze de Moraes, 1874.
- Em Terra e no Mar. 1912.
- Grande data a comemorar: 24 de julho de 1868. Petrópolis: Vozes, 1921.
- Brasil berço da Sciencia Aeronáutica. London: Mary Frear Keeler, 1924.

== Distinctions ==
- Officer of the Imperial Order of the Cross
- Officer of the Imperial Order of the Rose
- Grand Cross of the Imperial Order of St. Benedict of Avis
- Officer of the Royal Order of Isabella the Catholic
- Chamberlain to the last empress of Brazil, Teresa Cristina of the Two Sicilies
- Member of the Institut de France
- Honorary member of the Brazilian Historic and Geographic Institute
- Member of the Lisbon Geographic Society
- Corresponding member of the French Academy of Sciences
- Corresponding member of the Royal Spanish Academy of Sciences

== Legacy ==
The Brazilian research ship Barão de Teffé was named after him.
