= Sonos (disambiguation) =

Sonos may refer to:

- Sonos, a music device manufacturer.
- Sonos (vocal group), an electronic and vocal music group formed in 2009
- SONOS, computer memory system
- SóNós, second album by Paula Toller

== See also ==
- Sonus (disambiguation)
