= Amanhã é 23 =

Single by Kid Abelha

from the album Tomate
- Released: 1987
- Genre: Pop rock
- Length: 4:48
- Label: WEA
- Songwriters: Paula Toller and George Israel

"Amanhã é 23" (English: Tomorrow Is 23rd) is a Brazilian pop song written by Paula Toller and George Israel and performed by their band Kid Abelha in the album Tomate (1987).

== Song information ==
The song is narrated by a woman who has depression in late August of each year. It is then revealed the cause of her depression; the following day (August 23, hence the title) is the twentieth birthday of her rebellious teenage daughter who she has not seen for years. She longs to kiss and embrace her daughter, but she is certain that it will not happen. The daughter has, presumably, run away from home because of her indifference towards her mother. Curiously, August 23 is the date of Toller's birthday.

This song may refer to Paula’s personal story as her mother has abandoned her when she was 5 years old. The music was written by Paula on her 25’ birthday. The song starts with the phrase “20 years ago you’re born”, meaning in reality the anniversary of the detachment of her mother from her family, as her mother had “reborn”.

In the song, Paula induces that she has an old photo from her mother and says that now she had grown up she hasn’t many similarities with her.

It is likely that her mother suffered of depression and that she showed a unhappy face in the photo mentioned, as the following lyrics says “your sad mien feeds my pain”. Her mother also may have looked posh as it is mentioned in the following sentence “your princess’ attitude, where have you got it from?”

Therefore the song may be a subtle message, a sad outburst from an internal child longing contact to her lost mother, as a present for her birthday - “tomorrow is 23 (August), 8 days to the end of the month. So long I haven’t seen you, I would like to have your kiss one more time”.

=== Grammar inaccuracy ===
The title of the song is inaccurate according to the prescriptive grammar for Portuguese. Accordingly, the verb should have been used in its plural form (amanhã são 23) or in its singular form but preceded by the explicit object (amanhã é dia 23). The composers, however, must have been aware of this and decided to use this sentence on the song because it is widely used in casual language.
