= Seu Espião =

Studio album by Kid Abelha
- Released: 1984
- Genre: New wave
- Label: WEA
- Producer: Liminha

Kid Abelha chronology
Seu Espião (1984)	Educação Sentimental (1985)

Seu Espião (English: Your Spy) is the debut album by Brazilian pop band Kid Abelha, released in 1984 by WEA Records. It features some of the band's biggest hits such as "Alice (Não Escreva Aquela Carta De Amor)", "Fixação", "Como Eu Quero", "Porque Não Eu?" and "Pintura Íntima".

== Track listing ==
1. "Seu Espião" (Your Spy) (Leoni, Paula Toller, Herbert Vianna)
2. "Nada Tanto Assim" (Nothing That Much) (Leoni, Bruno Fortunato)
3. "Alice (Não Escreva Aquela Carta De Amor)" [Alice (Don't Write Me That Love Letter)] (Leoni, Toller, Fortunato)
4. "Hoje Eu Não Vou" (I'm Not Going Today) (Beni, Leoni, Toller)
5. "Fixação" (Fixation) (Beni, Leoni, Toller)
6. "Como Eu Quero" (The Way I Want) (Leoni, Toller)
7. "Ele Quer Me Conquistar" (He Wants to Get to Me) (Leoni)
8. "Porque Não Eu?" (Why Not Me?) (Leoni, Toller, Vianna)
9. "Homem Com Uma Missão" (Man on a Mission) (Leoni)
10. "Pintura Íntima" (Private Painting) (Leoni, Toller)
