= Waiting for Touchdown =

Waiting For Touchdown

Compilation album by Sneaky Feelings
- Released: 1986
- Label: Flying Nun UK – FNUK 2
- Producer: Phil Yule, Sneaky Feelings

Sneaky Feelings chronology
Sentimental Education (1986)	Waiting For Touchdown (1986)	Hard Love Stories (1988)

Professional ratings
Review scores
Source	Rating
AllMusic	4/5 stars

Waiting for Touchdown is a compilation album by the New Zealand band Sneaky Feelings, released in 1986. It combines songs from the album Send You and the singles "Husband House" and "Better than Before".

== Critical reception ==
AllMusic called the album "a highly crafted and beautiful collection of guitar pop songs, exhibiting a sound and sensibility that would crop up much later in the U.K. indie sound of Arab Strap and Belle & Sebastian."

== Track listing ==
Side A

1. Better Than Before
2. Waiting for Touchdown
3. Someone Else's Eyes
4. Strangers Again
5. Wouldn't Cry
6. Not to Take Sides

Side B

1. Throwing Stones
2. Major Barbara
3. The Strange and Conflicting Feelings of Separation and Betrayal
4. Husband House
5. Won't Change

== Personnel ==
- Kathryn Tyrie - bass guitar
- John Kelcher - vocals, bass guitar, synthesizer, piano
- Martin Durrant - vocals, drums, piano, synthesizer, percussion
- David Pine - vocals, guitar, bass guitar
- Matthew Bannister - vocals, guitar, organ, piano, synthesizer, vibraphone, percussion
- Chris Neilson - trumpet
