= Educação Sentimental (songs) =

"Educação Sentimental (Parts I & II)"

Song by Kid Abelha

from the album Educação Sentimental
- Released: 1985
- Genre: Brazilian pop
- Composers: Carlos Leoni, Paula Toller, Herbert Vianna

"Educação Sentimental (Parts I & II)" (English: Sentimental education) are two Brazilian pop songs performed by Kid Abelha, which serve as the title tracks for their second studio album Educação Sentimental (1985). "Educação Sentimental (Part I)" was composed by Carlos Leoni, while "Educação Sentimental (Part II)" was composed by him alongside band member Paula Toller and Herbert Vianna (Toller's then boyfriend and member from the equally successful band Os Paralamas do Sucesso). There is also a well known version of "Educação Setimental (Part II)" performed by the band Biquíni Cavadão.
