= Sneaky Feelings =

New Zealand pop rock band

- Origin: Dunedin, New Zealand
- Genre: Dunedin rock
- Years active: 1980–1989, 1992, 2017–present
- Label: Flying Nun Records
- Members: Matthew Bannister; David Pine; John Kelcher; Martin Durrant
- Past members: Kat Tyrie; Ross Burge

Sneaky Feelings are a New Zealand pop rock band which releases on the Flying Nun Records music label. The band formed in 1980 with the line-up of Matthew Bannister (guitar & vocals), David Pine (guitar & vocals), Kat Tyrie (bass guitar & vocals) and Martin Durrant (drums & vocals). Tyrie was replaced by John Kelcher in 1984. Durrant was temporarily replaced by Ross Burge in 1988 for the band's second tour of Europe.

Sneaky Feelings are unusual among Dunedin sound bands in that all four members of the band sing and write songs. The jangle sound of the guitars and layered vocals drew their influence from the music of the Byrds and the Beatles, and comparisons can be made with some of California's Paisley Underground bands.

The band's name comes from a song by Elvis Costello, "Sneaky Feelings", which is on his first album My Aim Is True (1977).

== History ==
Sneaky Feelings were one of four Dunedin bands to reap the benefits of the newly formed Flying Nun label with the release of the Dunedin Double EP in 1982, alongside the Stones, the Verlaines and the Chills. Sneaky Feelings were drawn to a wider variety of musical styles than most early Flying Nun bands and were one of the first to experiment in the recording studio. However the multi-voiced harmonies of the band's sound were not well-suited to the primitive recording conditions of early Flying Nun, so it is rarely captured at its best on the albums they released. The band's biggest hit was their single "Husband House" in 1985, which reached number 16 in the NZ charts.

After the demise of Sneaky Feelings in 1989, Bannister founded the Dribbling Darts. He later worked briefly with the Mutton Birds alongside Ross Burge. Subsequently, Bannister formed the band The Weather. He also wrote a book about the experience of being in a band during the heyday of the Dunedin sound movement - Positively George Street. Pine has returned sporadically to music, notably in the Dunedin-based band Death Ray Cafe in the late 1980s, joined by Nathan McConnell (drums, percussion), Mark Brooke (guitar, vocals) and Peter Bell (bass, vocals). His involvement in music has been largely curtailed by his work in the New Zealand diplomatic corps. In June 2020 he was appointed New Zealand's High Commissioner to India. Sneaky Feelings briefly re-formed in 1992 to record several extra tracks and to tour to promote the CD release of Send You. They also re-formed to perform a one-off concert as part of a celebration of Dunedin music, held in that city in 2006. In early 2008, Kelcher formed The South Tonight with Richard James, who had also been in an early Flying Nun group, Mainly Spaniards. Kelcher later stood as a candidate for the Green Party of Aotearoa New Zealand in the 2014 New Zealand general election, for the Christchurch seat of Ilam.

While Sneaky Feelings may have not played much over the years, the individual members have continued to hone their songwriting skills. After a 29-year hiatus, the band released Progress Junction in 2017. It was recorded over two years in bass player John Kelcher's Christchurch studio, with each band member contributing three tracks. They experimented with weaving in snippets of audio from New Zealand radio archives and voices from the past started talking to the present. Progress Junction received wide praise from critics at home, including the Sunday Star Times's Jack Barlow who dubbed it "a vibrant and fresh offering from one of New Zealand’s finest" to William Dart (RNZ New Horizons ) who referred to the album as "the unexpected renaissance of one of my favourite bands of all time". Nick Bollinger of RNZ wrote "David Pine and Matthew Bannister, who wrote the first and second song respectively, were always the chief songwriters in the Sneakies and as these opening tracks show, neither has lost their touch. These songs are melodic and poetic, and often employ humour even when the subject is serious." He continued: "But they are not the only writers in the group. This band has always appeared to be that rare institution, a functioning democracy. All four members contribute songs, and in the past some of the best ones came from drummer Martin Durrant. It was his 'Strangers Again' that Bic Runga covered so beautifully on her rarities set Try To Remember Everything, and his 'You Never Know' is one of the standouts on this record. It could almost be some pre-rock’n’roll, Great American Songbook classic as interpreted by a 60s beat group. In a way it sums up the breadth of this band and the respect for the whole history and craft of popular song that has always come through in their music."

Sneaky Feelings' latest LP is The Mercury Moment. It was released on April 17, 2020 on Flying Nun Records and the quartet's Bandcamp page. They announced the forthcoming 12-song LP after a rare performance on Waitangi Day 2020. The Mercury Moment is a "...potent exploration of extinction, redundancy and disappointed dreams as the four songwriters cast their attention on the current state of the world."

Reviewer Graham Reid commented that The Mercury Moment is "an album which deals with Big Picture issues and ideas (Heavenly Bodies which comes down from the stars to communicating online) and also drills down into the world we are given... which isn't the one we might have expected or wished for... And this was written before Covid-19."

== Discography ==
Date	Title	Label	Charted	Country	Catalog number
Albums
1984	Send You	Flying Nun Records	-	Aotearoa / NZ	FEEL 1
1987	Sentimental Education	Flying Nun Records	-	Aotearoa / NZ	FEEL 6; FNE 14CD
1986	Waiting for Touchdown (compilation)	Flying Nun Records	-	Aotearoa / NZ	FN ANDA62
1988	Hard Love Stories	Flying Nun Records	-	Aotearoa / NZ	FN112; FNE 26 CD
1999	Positively George Street (compilation)	Flying Nun Records	-	Aotearoa / NZ	FNCD441
2017	Progress Junction	Flying Nun Records	-	Aotearoa / NZ	FN579LP
2020	The Mercury Moment	Flying Nun Records	-	Aotearoa / NZ	FN592
EPs
1982	Dunedin Double	Flying Nun Records	-	-	FN DUN 1/2

=== Featured appearances ===
The group appeared on several compilations over the years in New Zealand. The following is a list of these albums that included tracks by Sneaky Feelings:

- (1987) - Tuatara: A Flying Nun Compilation (Flying Nun Records) - "Throwing Stones"
- (1988) - In Love With These Times (Flying Nun Records) - "Trouble With Kay"
- (2003) - Nature's Best 3 (Sony Music) - "Husband House"

=== Singles ===
Year	Single	Album	NZ Singles Chart	Label
1982	"Be My Friend"	-	31	Flying Nun Records – FN015
1985	"Husband House"	Take Sides	16	Flying Nun Records – FEEL 2
1986	"Better Than Before"	-	34	Flying Nun Records – FEEL 3
1986	"Coming True"	Sentimental Education	-	Flying Nun Records – FEEL 5
1987	"Trouble With Kay"	Sentimental Education	-	Flying Nun Records – FEEL 7
1988	"Long Time Gone"	Hard Love Stories	-	Flying Nun Records – FN119
