= Além da Alienação =

Studio album by João Penca e Seus Miquinhos Amestrados
- Released: 1988
- Genre: New wave, rockabilly, doo-wop, comedy rock, surf music, rock and roll
- Label: RCA Records
- Producer: Reinaldo Barriga

João Penca e Seus Miquinhos Amestrados chronology
Okay My Gay (1986)	Além da Alienação (1988)	Sucesso do Inconsciente (1989)

Além da Alienação (Portuguese for "Beyond the Alienation") is the third studio album by Brazilian new wave band João Penca e Seus Miquinhos Amestrados. It was released in 1988 by RCA Records. Making a guest appearance is Virginie Boutaud of Metrô fame on the track "Sem Ilusões".

== Covers/parodies ==
Every João Penca album features Portuguese-language covers/parodies of old 1940s/1950s rock and roll/rockabilly and 1960s surf music songs.

"A Louca do Humaitá"

A parody of Holl Ister/Thomas Nolan's "Ring Around Your Neck".

== Track listing ==
No.	Title	Lyrics	Length
1.	"Sparring"	Leandro Verdeal, Selvagem Big Abreu, Tony Wilson	3:33
2.	"A Louca do Humaitá" (The Madwoman from Humaitá)	Selvagem Big Abreu	2:22
3.	"Sem Ilusões" (Without Illusions — feat. Virginie Boutaud)	Joni Galvão, Léo Jaime	3:25
4.	"Pronta?" (Ready?)	Dodô Ferreira	3:13
5.	"Perdidos no Espaço" (Lost in Space)	Carlos Barmack, Leandro Verdeal, Selvagem Big Abreu	4:21
6.	"Banana Split"	Bernardo Vilhena, Erasmo Carlos	2:47
7.	"Homem de Saia" (Man in a Skirt)	Leandro Verdeal, Marcelo Elo	3:19
8.	"Jazz Jazz"	Dodô Ferreira, Leandro Verdeal	2:27
9.	"Vodu" (Voodoo)	Leandro Verdeal, Tony Wilson	3:00
10.	"Muzak"	Carlos Barmack, Dodô Ferreira, Leandro Verdeal	2:38
11.	"Hino do J.P.M.A." (Anthem of J.P.M.A.)	Dodô Ferreira	2:39

== Personnel ==
João Penca e Seus Miquinhos Amestrados

- Selvagem Big Abreu (Sérgio Ricardo Abreu) — vocals, electric guitar
- Avellar Love (Luís Carlos de Avellar Júnior) — vocals, bass
- Bob Gallo (Marcelo Ferreira Knudsen) — vocals, drums

Guest musicians

- Virginie Boutaud — female vocals (on track 3)

Miscellaneous staff

- Reinaldo Barriga — production
- Miguel Plopschi — art direction
