= Rodolfo Bottino =

Brazilian actor and chef (1959–2011)

- Born: February 11, 1959; Rio de Janeiro, Rio de Janeiro, Brazil
- Died: December 11, 2011 (aged 52); Salvador, Bahia, Brazil
- Education: Fluminense Federal University; Le Cordon Bleu
- Occupation(s): Actor, chef
- Years active: 1979–2011

Rodolfo Bottino (February 11, 1959 – December 11, 2011) was a Brazilian film, television and theater actor, and chef.

== Biography ==
Rodolfo Bottino was born in Rio de Janeiro on February 11, 1959, and was of Italian descent. He studied engineering at the Fluminense Federal University under his father's request, but never followed the career; around 1979, he began to act in his first theater plays at the university. Discovered by Rede Globo in 1984, he debuted as an actor on the telenovela Livre para Voar. His breakthrough, however, was in the 1986 miniseries Anos Dourados as Lauro. Throughout the late 1980s he continued to act on other Rede Globo telenovelas such as Bambolê, Bebê a Bordo and O Sexo dos Anjos. During the 1990s he collaborated with filmmaker Oswaldo Caldeira on his films Tiradentes (as Joaquim Silvério dos Reis) and Pampulha, ou A Invenção do Mar de Minas. In 2005 he guest-starred in an episode of the TV series Mandrake. His final role prior to his death was a guest appearance in the 2011 film O Homem do Futuro as a bartender.

Alongside his acting career, Bottino was a chef. His passion for cooking began when he was five years old; he later travelled to France to study at the famous culinary school Le Cordon Bleu. From 1986 to 1994 he owned his own restaurant in Rio de Janeiro, "Madrugada". Around the 2000s he hosted cooking shows at TV Shoptime, and also gave culinary lessons.

Towards the end of his life Bottino was living in Salvador, Bahia. On December 11, 2011, he died following a pulmonary embolism while he prepared for a surgery both in his hip and his femur. His body was then taken to Rio de Janeiro and buried at the St. John the Baptist Cemetery.

== Personal life ==
In May 2009 Bottino revealed many details of his personal life to newspaper O Globo during an interview. He claimed that during his youth he suffered from anorexia nervosa, and that he contracted AIDS at some point during the early 1990s. He also came out as bisexual. Bottino was also diagnosed with lung cancer in the early 2000s, but after treatment was declared cancer-free in 2006.

He was the cousin of fellow actor Alexandre Lippiani, who died in a car accident on May 24, 1997.

== Filmography ==
| Year | Title | Role | Notes |
|---|---|---|---|
| 1996 | O Fim do Mundo | Prosecution attorney | TV series |
| 1999 | Tiradentes | Joaquim Silvério dos Reis | |
| 2003 | Benjamim | Gâmbolo | |
| 2003 | Gregório de Mattos | Capitão | |
| 2011 | O Homem do Futuro | Barman | (final film role) |
