= Tetrá de Teffé =

Brazilian writer

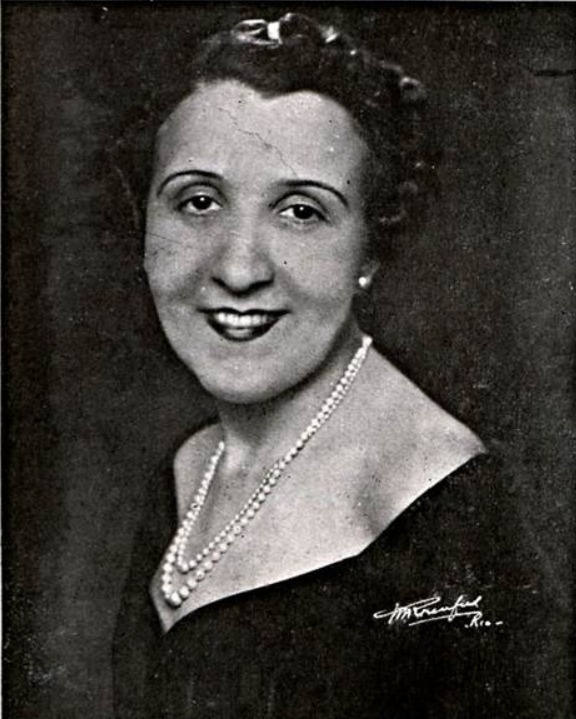
- Tetrá de Teffé, in 1940
- Born: Tetrazzini de Almeida Nobre; August 21, 1897 Rio de Janeiro, Brazil
- Died: October 19, 1995 Rio de Janeiro, Brazil
- Occupation: Writer

Tetrá de Teffé (1897-1995) was a Brazilian writer. She was born in Rio de Janeiro as Tetrazzini de Almeida Nobre, belonging to an aristocratic family from São Paulo. Her parents were Francisco de Almeida Nobre and Elisa Fernandina Paes de Barros. She married Álvaro de Teffé, son of the Baron of Teffé. She is best known for her novel Bati à Porta da Vida, which won the Machado de Assis Prize from the Brazilian Academy of Letters in 1941. She became the first female writer to win such an accolade.

A lifelong carioca, she died in Rio de Janeiro in 1995.
