= O Sexo dos Anjos =

- Genre: Telenovela
- Created by: Ivani Ribeiro
- Based on: O Terceiro Pecado by Ivani Ribeiro
- Starring: Isabela Garcia; Felipe Camargo; Bia Seidl; Mário Gomes; Sílvia Buarque; Caíque Ferreira; Marcos Frota; Carla Marins; Irving São Paulo; Norma Bengell; Paulo Figueiredo; Myrian Pérsia; Eloísa Mafalda; Bianca Byington; Rodolfo Bottino
- Opening theme: "Matinê no Rian"
- Composers: João Penca e Seus Miquinhos Amestrados and Paula Toller
- Country of origin: Brazil
- Original language: Portuguese
- No. of episodes: 143

Original release
- Network: Rede Globo
- Release: 25 September 1989 – 9 March 1990

O Sexo dos Anjos is a Brazilian telenovela (soap opera) produced and aired in the 6pm time slot by Rede Globo from 25 September 1989 to 9 March 1990, in 143 chapters. It replaced Pacto de Sangue in the same time slot and was succeeded by Gente Fina.

Written by Ivani Ribeiro, with collaboration with Solange Castro Neves, it's a remake of the soap opera O Terceiro Pecado of 1968, from the TV Excelsior. It was directed by Roberto Talma along with collaborators Flávio Colatrello Jr. and Fábio Sabag.

== Synopsis ==
The Angel of Death (Bia Seidl) sends to Earth an emissary, Adriano (Felipe Camargo), to look for a young woman Isabela (Isabela Garcia). But he ends up falling in love with the girl and, tries to bargain her soul for that of her mean sister's, Ruth (Sílvia Buarque). Death does not accept the exchange, but agrees to give the young woman another chance. She commits only two sins; if he commits the third, she will die. Meanwhile, Ruth usually mistreats her brother, the deaf Tomás (Marcos Frota) - whom she blames as being the cause of all her troubles - and lives fighting with Diogo (Caíque Ferreira), a friend of the family, until she finds out she's in love with him.

One story also focused on the romance of Gigi (Carla Marins) and Zé Paulo (Irving São Paulo), watched closely by the boy's mother, Vera (Norma Benguell), who does not accept the poor girl as his son's girlfriend. Vera herself hides a passion for Durval (Paulo Figueiredo), the boyfriend of her sister Leonor (Myrian Pérsia), mother of Isabela, Ruth and Tomás.

In life, families seem like a mysterious figure of Father Aurélio (Mário Gomes), a man who hides his past and his true identity. He is Renato, an environmentalist who suffers the persecution of powerful landowners for defending a nature. But the Angel of Death descends to Earth to watch the work of his emissary, Adriano. Under the identity of the mysterious Diana, she ends up being interested in Renato.

== Cast ==
Actor	Character
Isabela Garcia	Isabela
Felipe Camargo	Adriano
Bia Seidl	Angel of Death / Diana
Mário Gomes	Renato / Priest Aurélio (false)
Sílvia Buarque	Ruth
Caíque Ferreira	Diogo
Marcos Frota	Tomás
Carla Marins	Gigi
Irving São Paulo	Zé Paulo
Norma Bengell	Vera
Paulo Figueiredo	Durval
Myrian Pérsia	Leonor
Bianca Byington	Neide
Eloísa Mafalda	Francisquinha
Otávio Müller	Rogê
Tonico Pereira	Aranha
Humberto Martins	Otávio
Stepan Nercessian	Antônio
Rodolfo Bottino	Cássio
Rosana Garcia	Lucinha
Inês Galvão	Luísa
João Camargo	Araquém
Lutero Luiz	Bastião
Ilva Niño	Anésia
João Rabello	Cuca
Emiliano Queiroz	Priest Julião
Ana Borges	Marilu
Cosme dos Santos	Demétrio
Leina Krespi	Jandira
Edson Silva	Jair
Paula Burlamaqui	Bia
Tony Vermont	Léo
Graziela Di Laurentis	Baby
