= Another Disc, Another Dollar =

EP by The Stones
- Released: 1983
- Recorded: 21–22 December 1982
- Genre: Indie rock
- Label: Flying Nun Records - BUCK 001

The Stones chronology
Dunedin Double (1982)	Another Disc, Another Dollar (1983)

Another Disc, Another Dollar is the second and final EP by the New Zealand band the Stones, released in 1983. It was reissued as part of the Three Blind Mice compilation, in 2015.

It peaked at No. 33 on the New Zealand charts.

== Track listing ==
Side A

1. Gunner Ho
2. Funky Conversations
3. At The Cafe

Side B

1. Fad World
2. Final Days

== Personnel ==
- Jeff Batts (bass, vocals)
- Graeme Anderson (drums, organ)
- Wayne Elsey (guitar, vocals)
