= Paulo Diniz =

Brazilian singer and composer (1940–2022)

- Born: Paulo Lira de Oliveira; 24 January 1940; Pesqueira, Pernambuco, Brazil
- Died: 22 June 2022 (aged 82); Recife, Brazil
- Occupation: Singer
- Years active: 1966–2019
- Musical career
- Genres: MPB, iê-iê-iê, tropicália

Paulo Lira de Oliveira, best known as Paulo Diniz (24 January 1940 – 22 June 2022), was a Brazilian singer and composer.

== Biography ==
Born in Pesqueira, Diniz started his career at 12 years old as a radio announcer. In 1964 he moved to Rio de Janeiro to work at Rádio Tupi as an announcer and sports commentator.

Diniz began his professional career as a singer in 1966, when he was put under contract by the record label Copacabana and released his first single, "O chorão". In the 1970s he got his major hits, such as "Um chope pra distrair", "Bahia comigo" and "Quero voltar pra Bahia". His most successful composition was "Pingos de amor", a song written together with Odibar Moreira da Silva and originally released in 1971, which was later covered by prominent artists such as Kid Abelha, Sula Miranda and Neguinho da Beija-Flor. He was also well-known for his musical adaptations of Brazilian poems, notably "E agora José", based on a poem by Carlos Drummond de Andrade, "Vou me embora pra Pasárgada", from a poem by Manuel Bandeira, and "Definição do amor" by Gregório de Matos.

Starting from the 1980s Diniz slowed his career as he suffered several health issues, notably schistosomiasis, which caused a paralysis of the lower limbs and forced him to use a wheelchair. He died of natural causes in his Recife home on 22 June 2022, at the age of 82.

== Discography ==
Albums

- Brasil - Brasa - Braseiro - 1967
- Quero Voltar Pra Bahia - 1970
- Paulo Diniz - 1971
- E agora - José? - 1972
- Lugar Comum - 1973
- Paulo Diniz - 1974
- Paulo Diniz - 1975
- Estradas - 1976
- É Marca Ferrada - 1978
- Canção do Exílio - 1984
- Pegou de Jeito - 1985
- 20 super sucessos-novas regravações - 1997
- Reviravolta - 2004
