= Sonus =

Sonus is a Latin word that means noise or sound. It may refer to:

- the root word of sonic and sound
- Sonus (journal)
- Sonus Networks, a technology and telecommunications company that merged into Ribbon Communications
- SONUS, the online jukebox of electroacoustic works maintained by the Canadian Electroacoustic Community
- Sonus, a popular line of electric bass guitars produced by Zon Guitars

== See also ==
- Sonar, a device that uses sound waves to detect objects, and measure their distance and direction
- Sonos (disambiguation)
