= Crisis of the fake letters =

1921 Brazilian political scandal

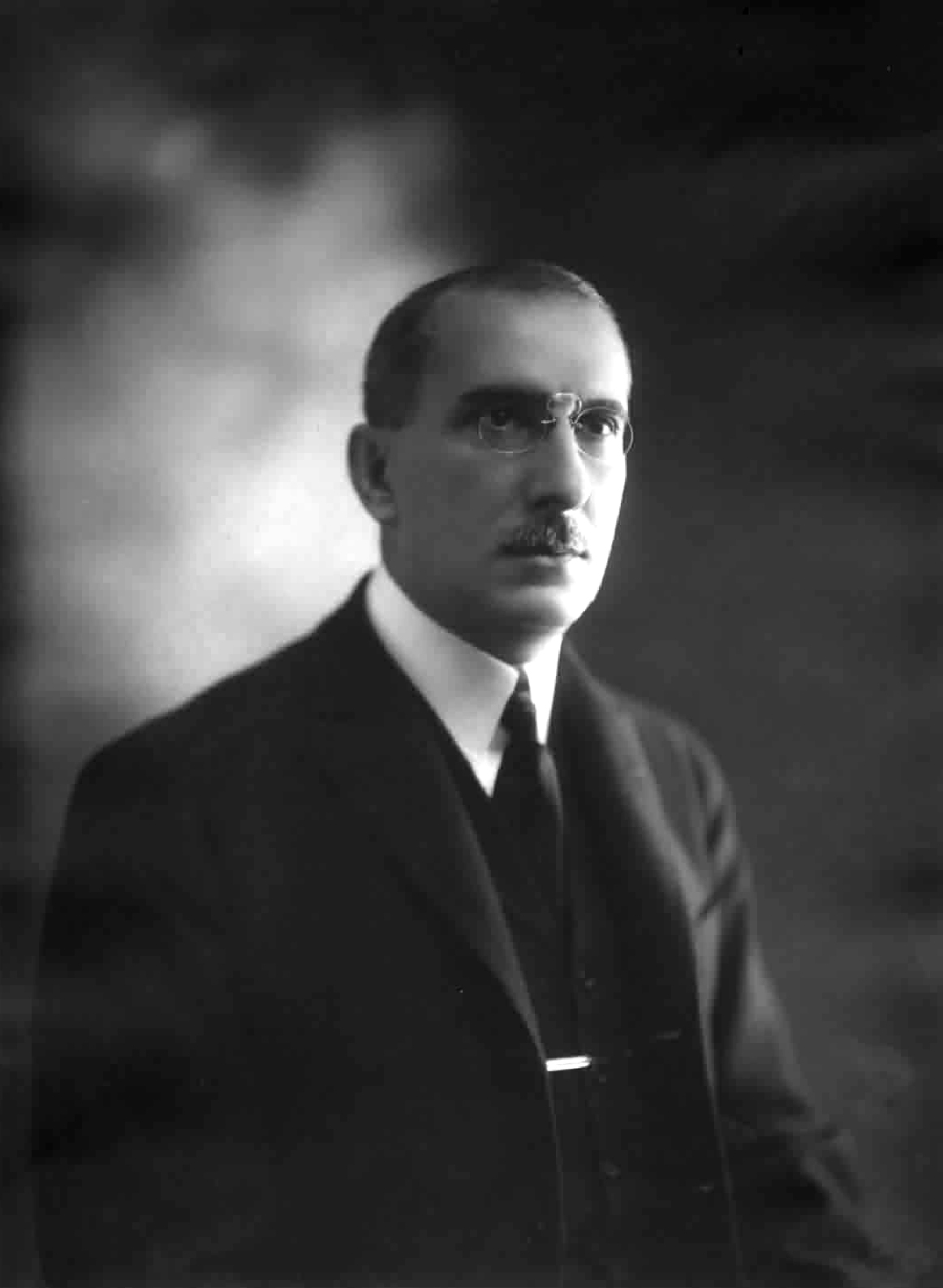
Artur Bernardes, victim of the fake letters

The crisis of the fake letters was a political scandal in Brazil in 1921 involving two disclosed letters containing offenses against the Brazilian military and Nilo Peçanha. The letters were attributed to Artur Bernardes, then governor of Minas Gerais and a candidate for the 1922 presidential elections.

The scandal that ensued intensified the military's opposition to Bernardes, who went on to win the election in March 1922, but faced the tenentist movement during his government, the beginning of a process of political rupture in the First Brazilian Republic that culminated in the Revolution of 1930.

== The case ==
The first letter, dated 3 June 1921, referred to marshal Hermes da Fonseca as a "sergeant without manners". It also called the banquet at which his candidacy for the presidency was launched as an "orgy", and said, regarding the military, that "this scourge needs a reprimand to enter into discipline". And continued: “See if Epitácio [Pessoa] shows his vaunted energy, severely punishing these daring ones, arresting those who strayed from discipline and removing these anarchist generals to far away". The second letter, dated 6 June 1921, referred to an extension of the Presidential Convention, "because it should have been held before the arrival of Nilo [Peçanha], because as you said, this kid is capable of anything. Remove all difficulties as you see fit, without looking at expenses".

After the letters were published by Correio da Manhã, other newspapers began to give great attention to the subject. Debates in the Legislative Assembly of Rio de Janeiro, Brazil's Chamber of Deputies and Senate, as well as statements by politicians, military personnel and jurists regarding the authenticity of the letters were prominently publicized in the press.

The letters published by Correio da Manhã were actually forged, as it later turned out, by Pedro Burlamaqui, Oldemar Lacerda and Jacinto Cardoso de Oliveira Guimarães. Lacerda had obtained the papers with the Minas Gerais government letterhead from the State's Official Press. Burlamaqui brought the paper to Rio de Janeiro, and Guimarães wrote the content, strictly imitating Artur Bernardes' handwriting. Once the letters were ready, Burlamaqui and Lacerda looked for friends and relatives of marshal Hermes da Fonseca to sell them, which did not happen. They then approached Artur Bernardes himself, proposing to sell the letters for 30 million réis, but received another refusal. Lacerda then sought out Irineu Machado, a senator for the Federal District and opponent of Bernardes. The letters reached Correio da Manhã through the senator, who appointed the newspaper's political writer, Mário Rodrigues. The public registry office refused recognition of the letters because it found the signatures "disparate", but Correio da Manhã still vehemently insisted on their authenticity.

== Investigations ==
Artur Bernardes vehemently denied the authorship of the letters at all times. In November 1921, a committee was formed at the Military Club for the expert examination of the documents. Correio da Manhã appointed general Augusto Ximeno as an expert to the commission. Artur Bernardes appointed Afonso Pena Júnior, Afrânio de Melo and Raul Soares to provide the clarifications requested by the commission, and they appointed experts Simões Correia and general Alexandre Barbosa Lima to analyze the letters. The Military Club committee tasked Antônio Augusto de Serpa Pinto to carry out expertise analysis on the letters.

Simões Correia published his report, where he classified the documents as a fraud, "in the circumstance that the paper used in the first letter did not yet exist on 3 June, the date that is in the letter in question, because it had been ordered from the Official Press on 8 June, according to the certificate"; he also stated that, according to the examination of the spelling and its technical characters, it was a "forgery by decal". One of the clues that the letters were fake was in Artur Bernardes' signature, as the "t" was not cut in the letters, and all the documents indicated that Bernardes "cut" his "t". Another clue was the type of paper used, unlined. According to Bernardes, he never used this type of paper in his letters.

In January 1922, Edmundo Bittencourt, owner of Correio da Manhã, went to Europe to talk to experts. In France, expert Locard gave an opinion attesting to the authenticity of the signature. The director of the Institute of Political Science in Lausanne, Bischoff, was also heard and expressed his opinion on the falsehood. In Brazil, on 4 February 1922, Ruy Barbosa declared in his opinion that the letters were fake.

Shortly after the presidential elections, on 24 March 1922, Oldemar Lacerda and Jacinto Guimarães confessed that they had forged the letters. In front of those present, they justified the forgery as having only a political purpose, despite trying to charge for them, in order to elect Hermes da Fonseca as president. Only on 31 May did Oldemar Lacerda publish the story of the forgery in the press.

== Consequences ==
Despite all the controversy the "fake letters" caused, Bernardes was elected. His opponents, organized in the Republican Reaction bloc, a movement in defense of Nilo Peçanha's candidacy, did not accept the result and sought to intensify the opposition against Bernardes, calling on the military to challenge him.
