= Os Maiores Sucessos de João Penca e Seus Miquinhos Amestrados =

Studio album by João Penca e Seus Miquinhos Amestrados
- Released: 1983
- Genre: New wave, rockabilly, doo-wop, comedy rock, surf music, rock and roll
- Label: Barclay Records
- Producer: Ronaldo Bastos

João Penca e Seus Miquinhos Amestrados chronology
Os Maiores Sucessos de João Penca e Seus Miquinhos Amestrados (1983)	Okay My Gay (1986)

Os Maiores Sucessos de João Penca e Seus Miquinhos Amestrados (Portuguese for "The Greatest Hits of João Penca [Banana-Bunch Joe] and His Tamed Apes") is the debut studio album by the eponymous Brazilian new wave band, despite being billed on its cover and title as a greatest hits album. It was released in 1983 by Barclay Records.

It was the band's only release to feature keyboard player Cláudio Killer, who died on December 1, 1983, due to an accidental poisonous gas leakage in his apartment while he was taking a shower, and guitarist Léo Jaime, who parted ways with João Penca in 1984 to gave a solo career.

The album features guest appearances by Ney Matogrosso, Lulu Santos and Chacrinha.

== Covers/parodies ==
Every João Penca album features Portuguese-language covers/parodies of old 1940s/1950s rock and roll/rockabilly and 1960s surf music songs.

"Edmundo"

A parody of Glenn Miller's "In the Mood", originally written by Aloísio de Oliveira in the 1950s.

"O Ursinho"

A cover of Elvis Presley's "(Let Me Be Your) Teddy Bear".

"Calúnias (Telma, Eu Não Sou Gay)"

A parody of Light Reflections' "Tell Me Once Again".

== Track listing ==
No.	Title	Lyrics	Length
1.	"M"	Leandro Verdeal, Léo Jaime	4:37
2.	"Você Roubou Meu Coração" (You Stole My Heart)	Leandro Verdeal, Selvagem Big Abreu	2:09
3.	"O Sincero" (Sincere Guy)	Leandro Verdeal, Léo Jaime, Selvagem Big Abreu	3:06
4.	"Edmundo"	Aloísio de Oliveira	2:36
5.	"O Kaos (A Dança)" (The Kaos [The Dance])	Leandro Verdeal	2:00
6.	"Psicodelismo em Ipanema" (Psychedelia in Ipanema)	Leandro Verdeal	2:26
7.	"O Ursinho" (Teddy Bear)	Léo Jaime	2:32
8.	"Menina Fútil" (Futile Girl)	Leandro Verdeal, Léo Jaime	4:45
9.	"Calúnias (Telma, Eu Não Sou Gay)" (Lies [Telma, I'm Not Gay] — feat. Ney Matogrosso)	Leandro Verdeal, Léo Jaime, Selvagem Big Abreu	3:36
10.	"Keki Rolou" (Whazzup)	Léo Jaime, Tavinho Paes	2:17

== Personnel ==
João Penca e Seus Miquinhos Amestrados

- Selvagem Big Abreu (Sérgio Ricardo Abreu) — vocals, electric guitar
- Avellar Love (Luís Carlos de Avellar Júnior) — vocals, bass
- Bob Gallo (Marcelo Ferreira Knudsen) — vocals, drums
- Léo Jaime — electric guitar
- Cláudio Killer — keyboards

Guest musicians

- Lulu Santos — guitars in "M", "O Ursinho" and "Psicodelismo em Ipanema"
- Ney Matogrosso — additional vocals in "Calúnias"
- Chacrinha — voice in "Edmundo"
- Léo Gandelman — sax in "Calúnias"
- Cleberson Horsth — synth programming

Miscellaneous staff

- Ronaldo Bastos — production
- Eduardo Ramalho — mixing
- Léo Jaime — musical direction
