= SóNós =

Studio album by Paula Toller
- Released: June 28, 2007
- Recorded: at Cia. dos Técnicos, A.R., Studio 1 and Blue (Rio de Janeiro, RJ)
- Genre: Pop
- Length: 46:18
- Label: WEA
- Producer: Paul Ralphes

Paula Toller chronology
Paula Toller (1998)	SóNós (2007)

SóNós (English: UsAlone) is the second solo album by Kid Abelha lead singer Paula Toller, released by Warner Music Brasil on June 28, 2007.

== Track listing ==
1. "? (O Q é Q Eu Sou)" (Erasmo Carlos) – 3:12
2. "All Over" (Donavon Frankenreiter, Paul Ralphes, Caio Fonseca, Toller) – 3:22
3. "À Noite Sonhei Contigo" (Kevin Johansen / Portuguese version: Toller) – 3:52
4. "Pane de Maravilha" (Dado Villa-Lobos, Toller, Fausto Fawcet) / Incidental song: "Cidade Maravilhosa" (André Filho) – 3:28
5. "If You Won't" (Jesse Harris) – 2:21
6. "Meu Amor Se Mudou pra Lua" (Nenung) – 3:19
7. "Tudo Se Perdeu" (Rufus Wainwright¹ / Portuguese version: Toller) – 2:43
8. "Long Way from Home" (Harris) – 2:09
9. "Barcelona 16" (Toller, Ralphes, Fonseca) – 3:59
10. "Eu Quero Ir Pra Rua" (Coringa, Toller) – 3:50
11. "Um Primeiro Beijo" (Toller, Ralphes, Fonseca) – 2:54
12. "Vc me Ganhou de Presente" (Ralphes, Coringa, Toller) – 3:50
13. "Rústica" (Villa-Lobos, Toller) – 3:10
14. "Glass (I'm So Brazilian)" (Johansen) – 3:58

¹original title: Vicious World.
