= Hermes da Fonseca =

President of Brazil from 1910 to 1914

His Excellency Hermes da Fonseca
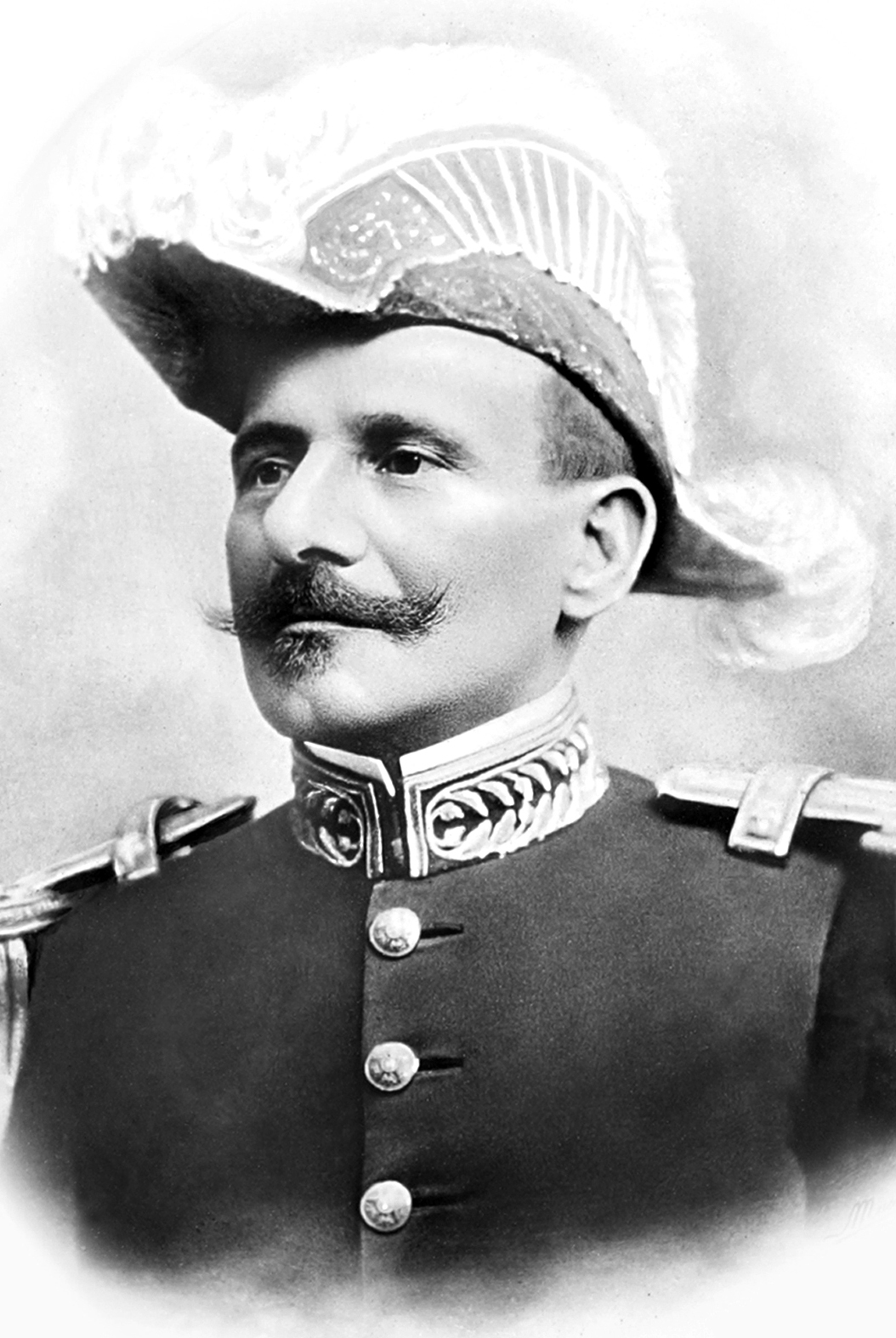
- Official portrait, 1910

8th President of Brazil
- In office 15 November 1910 – 15 November 1914
- Vice President: Venceslau Brás
- Preceded by: Nilo Peçanha
- Succeeded by: Venceslau Brás

President of the Military Club
- In office 26 June 1921 – 3 July 1922
- Preceded by: Crispim Ferreira
- Succeeded by: Setembrino de Carvalho

Justice of the Superior Military Court
- In office 18 December 1908 – 27 May 1909
- Nominated by: Afonso Pena
- Preceded by: Alexandrino Faria de Alencar
- Succeeded by: José Maria Marinho da Silva

Minister of War
- In office 15 November 1906 – 27 May 1909
- President: Afonso Pena
- Preceded by: Francisco de Paula Argolo
- Succeeded by: Luís Mendes de Morais

Personal details
- Born: 12 May 1855 São Gabriel, Rio Grande do Sul, Empire of Brazil
- Died: 9 September 1923 (aged 68) Petrópolis, Rio de Janeiro, Brazil
- Party: PRC
- Spouses: Orsina Francioni (m. 1878; died 1912) Nair de Tefé (m. 1913)
- Relations: Deodoro da Fonseca (uncle)
- Children: 5
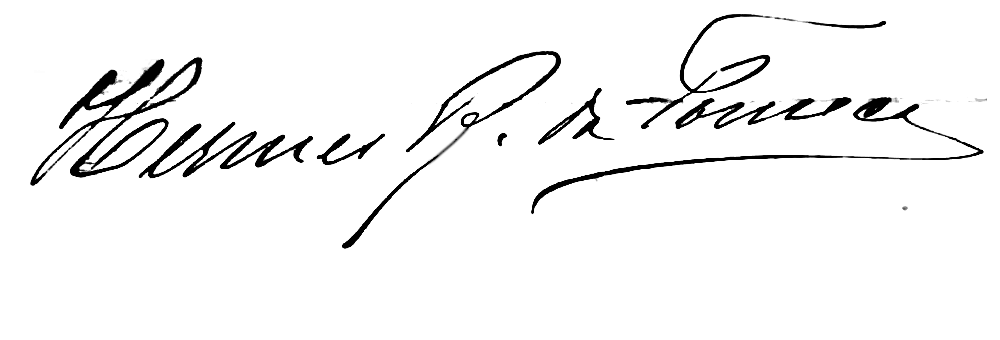
- Signature

Military service
- Allegiance: Empire of Brazil; Brazil
- Branch/service: Imperial Brazilian Army; Brazilian Army
- Years of service: 1871-1906
- Rank: Field Marshal
- Commands: See list: 1st Battery of the 2nd Artillery Regiment; General-Command of Artillery of the Imperial Army; 2nd Field Artillery Regiment; Directorate of the Bahia War Arsenal; Niterói Garrison Command; 2nd Mounted Artillery Regiment; Chief of the Military Cabinet; Police Brigade of Rio de Janeiro; 4th Military District Command
- Battles/wars: Brazilian Naval Revolts; Vaccine Revolt; Copacabana Fort revolt

Hermes Rodrigues da Fonseca (Brazilian Portuguese: [ˈɛʁmiz ʁoˈdɾiɡiz dɐ fõˈsekɐ]; 12 May 1855 – 9 September 1923) was a Brazilian field marshal and politician who served as the eighth president of Brazil between 1910 and 1914. He was a nephew of marshal Deodoro da Fonseca, the first president of Brazil, and general João Severiano da Fonseca, patron of the Army Health Service. His parents were the marshal Hermes Ernesto da Fonseca and Rita Rodrigues Barbosa.

== Early life ==
His father was born in Alagoas and, while serving in the army, was transferred to the town of São Gabriel, in Rio Grande do Sul, where Hermes was born, in 1855. When his father was sent to the Paraguayan War, the family returned to Rio de Janeiro. He studied at the Colégio Pedro II.

== Military career ==
In 1871, at the age of 16, he graduated with a degree in Science and Literature and joined the Military School of Praia Vermelha, where he was a student of Benjamin Constant Botelho de Magalhães, one of the introducers of the positivist ideas of Auguste Comte in Brazil, and thus did not escape the influence of the master, although he did not become an orthodox positivist. Upon graduating, Fonseca served as an assistant to prince Gaston de Orléans, the Count of Eu.

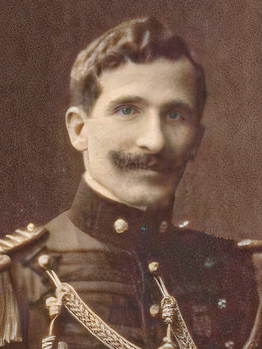
Hermes da Fonseca when young

Fonseca supported the proclamation of the Republic by his uncle Manuel Deodoro da Fonseca, and was invited by him to be a field assistant and military secretary after the seizure of power. In ten months, he went from captain to lieutenant colonel.

On the occasion of the 1893 Naval Rebellion, he stood out, in Niterói, in the command of the defense of the government of Floriano Peixoto. In 1894, he was promoted to colonel, in 1896 he commanded the 2nd Mounted Artillery Regiment, then was appointed head of the Military Cabinet. He commanded the Federal Capital Police Brigade, currently the Military Police of Rio de Janeiro state, between 1899 and 1904, when he took command of the Military School of Realengo, which formed the officers of the army.

As commander of the Realengo Preparatory School in 1904, he repressed the Vaccine Revolt, a movement that, in the name of individual freedom, protested against the compulsory vaccination against smallpox imposed in Rio de Janeiro, also showing the broader popular dissatisfaction with the regime. Fonseca commanded the 1st Military Region, in Rio de Janeiro, from 24 December 1904 to 7 July 1906. Then president Rodrigues Alves promoted him to marshal.

Fonseca held various government positions until he became Minister of War during the government of president Afonso Pena (1906–1909), from 15 November 1906 to 27 May 1909. During his term, at the suggestion of the Baron of Rio Branco, he sent Brazilian officers for training in the German Empire, who, after returning to Brazil, became known as the "Young Turks" . He also reformed the Army and the Ministry of War with the creation of large permanent units, known as the "Strategic Brigades", and technical and administrative services. Out of these innovations, the most important one was the institution of compulsory military service with the Sortition Law of 1908. However, the law was only de facto implemented in 1916. Due to the discussion in the Chamber of Deputies about the participation of the military in the political life of the country, he resigned. He was later minister of the Supreme Military Tribunal (later the Superior Military Court).

== Presidential election of 1910 ==
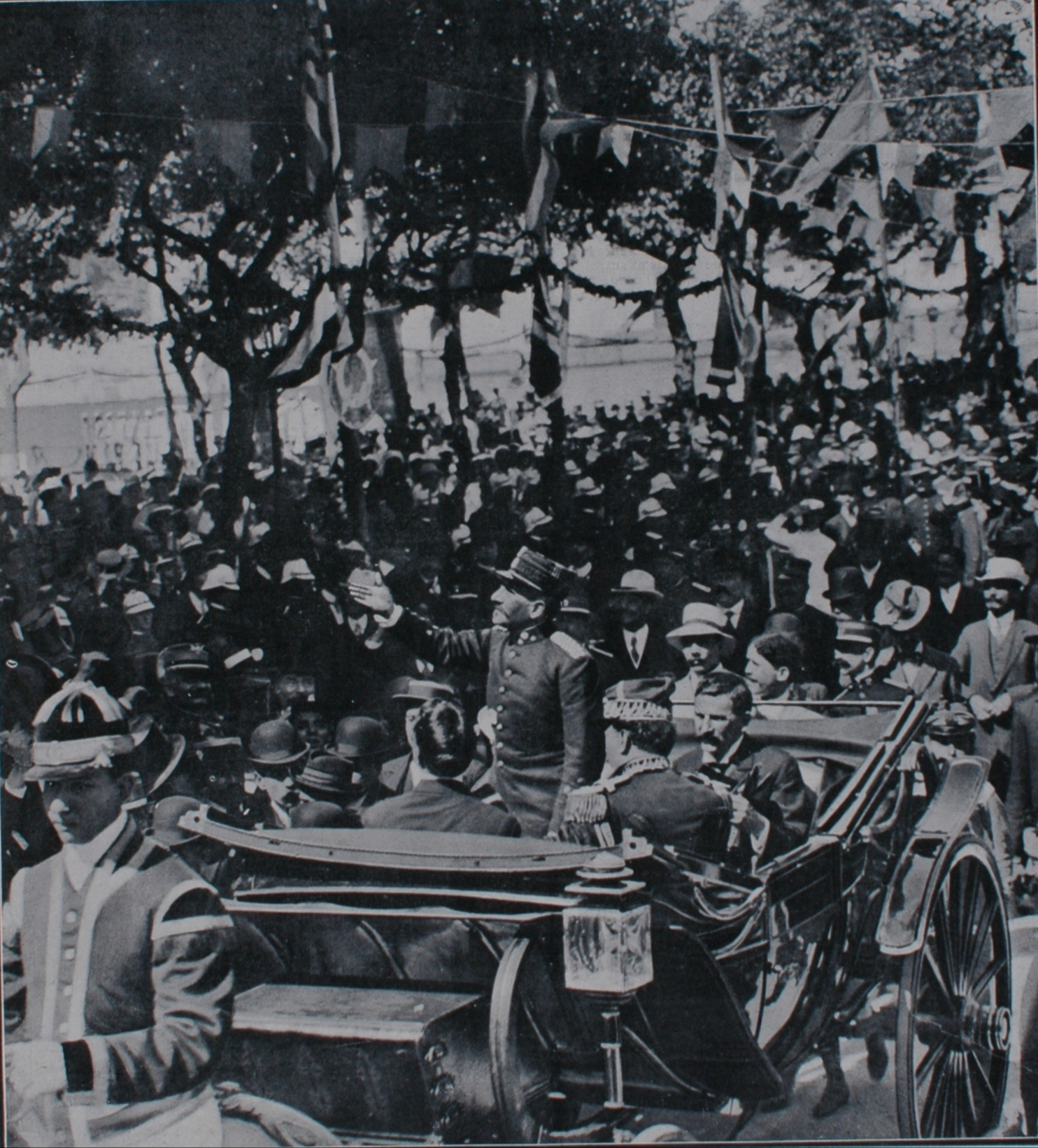
Hermes da Fonseca saluting the audience present at his inauguration. Next to Hermes in the carriage is Venceslau Brás (on the right), Hermes' vice president. In the front seat (from left to right), are: Alcebíades Peçanha and Bento Ribeiro

In November 1908, after returning from a trip to Germany, where he had witnessed military maneuvers as a guest of Kaiser Wilhelm II, he was nominated for presidential succession. He had the support of president Nilo Peçanha, who replaced Afonso Pena, and state representatives at the National Congress, except for the representatives of São Paulo and Bahia, who supported senator Ruy Barbosa and the president of São Paulo state, Albuquerque Lins, as Barbosa's vice-presidential candidate. Barbosa launched the Civilist Campaign for the presidency.

For the first time in the republican regime in Brazil, an electoral campaign climate was established with the dispute between the so-called civilists and the hermists. With the invitation of Nilo Peçanha to return to the Ministry of War, Fonseca strengthened his position and won the 1910 election against Ruy Barbosa.

In the 1910 election on 1 March 1910 the country was divided: Bahia, São Paulo, Pernambuco, Rio de Janeiro and part of Minas Gerais, supported Ruy Barbosa, who had the president of São Paulo, Albuquerque Lins, as his running mate; the other states supported Hermes da Fonseca, who had Venceslau Brás as his vice president. Hermes and Vencesláu Brás won. Hermes had 403,867 votes against 222,822 votes given to Ruy Barbosa. According to the Superior Electoral Court itself, however, the election of Fonseca took place at the cost of fraud (recurring at the time), that is, the tampering of the result, facilitated by the fact that Hermes da Fonseca was supported by the then president Nilo Peçanha.

After being elected, Fonseca traveled to Europe, where he witnessed the fall of the monarchy in Portugal.

== Presidency (1910–1914) ==
Hermes da Fonseca faced, in the first week of his government, in November 1910, the Revolt of the Lash, planned for about two years and which culminated in a mutiny of the sailors in the battleships Minas Gerais, São Paulo, Deodoro and the cruiser Bahia. The revolt was led by João Cândido. After the mutineers achieved their objective, ending the application of the lash punishments in the Navy, and the granting of amnesty to all the more than two thousand mutinous sailors, the government betrayed them and began a process of expulsion of sailors. The first mutiny, now under control, was followed by an uprising in the Marines battalion without apparent cause. President Hermes then ordered the bombardment of the ports and placed the country under a state of exception. More than 1,200 sailors were expelled and hundreds were arrested and killed. Despite being quite popular when elected, Hermes' image was greatly shaken after the revolt. Two years later, another revolt came to disrupt his presidency, the Contestado War, which was not quelled until the end of his government.

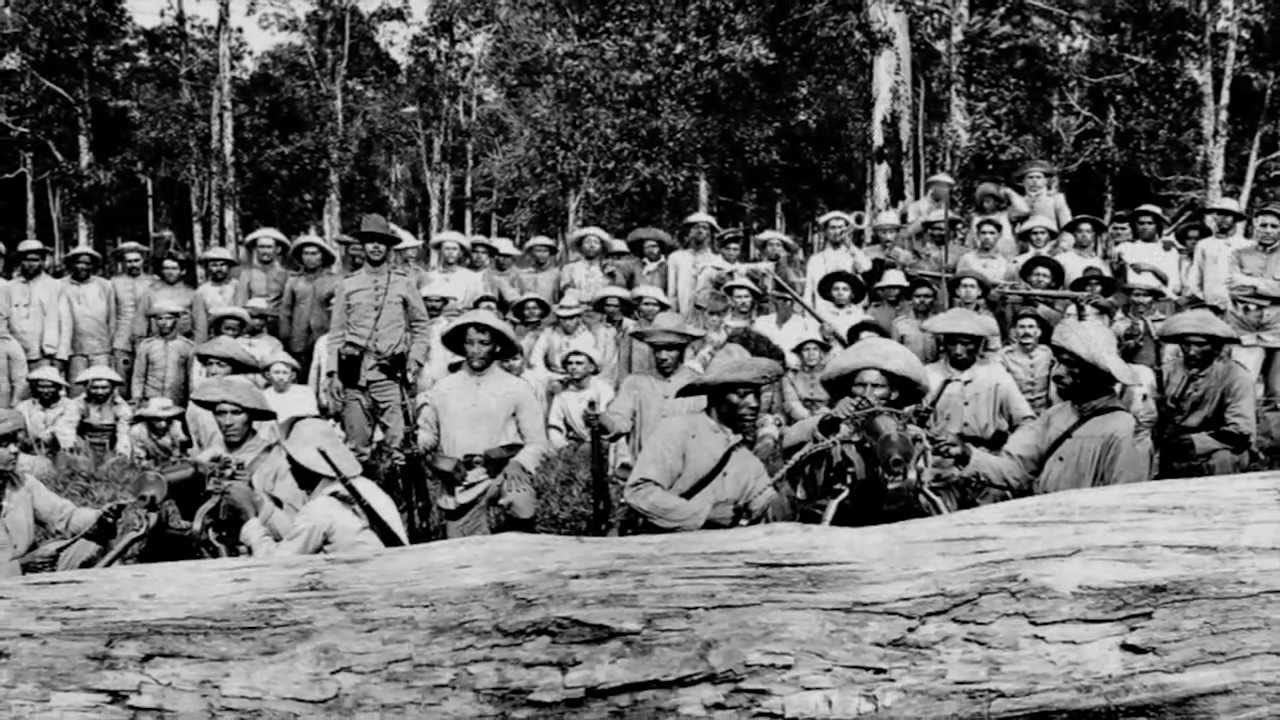
Infantry troops during the Contestado War

During his presidency, the so-called Salvation Policy was carried out, which, either through electoral maneuvers or the use of military force, tried to promote federal interventions in the states of São Paulo, Rio Grande do Sul, Pernambuco, Bahia, Piauí, Ceará and Alagoas, claiming the intention was to put an end to state political schemes and the practice of corruption, appointing new rulers to support his government. It was, therefore, a centralist policy. Despite being successful in the states of Pernambuco, Bahia and Alagoas, the Salvation Policy provoked violent popular and political opposition and caused a rupture in his relations with senator Pinheiro Machado, who was in favor of the status quo. Many elements of state politics engaged in armed struggle and managed to defeat the government, with the most violent fighting taking place in Ceará, where state politicians allied with the popular Catholic priest Cícero Romão to oppose government intervention in what became known as the Juazeiro Sedition.

In his government, there was a new renegotiation of the Brazilian foreign debt, in 1914, with a second funding loan (the first had been negotiated by Campos Sales), as Brazil's financial situation was not going well. His foreign policy maintained the rapprochement with the United States, outlined by the chancellor, the Baron of Rio Branco, who continued as minister of Foreign Affairs until 1912, when he died.

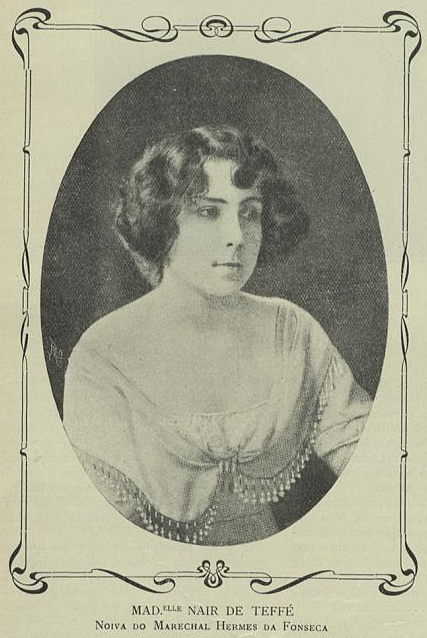
Nair de Tefé, 1913

Internally, the program for the construction of railways continued, including the Madeira-Mamoré railroad and technical-professional schools, outlined in the Afonso Pena government. The University of Paraná was created. Fonseca also completed the renovations and works of the Vila Militar de Deodoro and the Central Hospital of the Army, among others, in addition to the workers' villages in Rio de Janeiro, in the suburb of Marechal Hermes and in the neighborhood of Gávea.

With the increasing union mobilizations in Rio de Janeiro, president Hermes took an attitude hitherto unheard of in the First Brazilian Republic, which tended to repress union movements; In 1912, by transporting and providing facilities, he sponsored the holding of the Fourth Brazilian Workers Congress, which had been organized by his son, then deputy Mário Hermes. Such government action, however, was viewed with suspicion by union leaders, who disliked the so-called "yellow" unionist current, which sought collaboration with the government.

He was the only president to marry during the presidential term, his first wife, Orsina Francioni da Fonseca, whom he married on 16 April 1879, died on 30 November 1912. His second wife was the caricaturist Nair de Tefé von Hoonholtz, daughter of the Baron of Tefé. Nair would later be considered a feminist; she took part in the first celebrations of the International Women's Year. The civil and religious ceremonies took place on 8 December 1913, at the Rio Negro Palace, in Petrópolis.

During his government, a decree was issued instituting the use of the presidential sash in Brazil. Hermes da Fonseca was the first president to use it and the first to pass it on to his successor. Since then, all presidents have received it on inauguration.

Hermes da Fonseca is one of the only three military officers who reached the presidency of the republic in a direct and electoral way. The other two were Eurico Gaspar Dutra and Jair Bolsonaro. Throughout his tenure he was in military uniform, including during ministerial meetings.

== Later years ==
Upon leaving the presidency, in November 1914, he ran for the Senate for Rio Grande do Sul, but refused to assume the chair, due to the murder of Pinheiro Machado, on the day he was supposed to be inaugurated, in September 1915. He then traveled to Europe, moving away from politics, and only returned to Brazil in 1920, after living in Switzerland for six years, when a new presidential campaign began.

Affectionately welcomed by the military, he was led to the presidency of the Military Club in 1921. In this condition he came into conflict with the government of Epitácio Pessoa by honoring the political forces that supported Nilo Peçanha's candidacy, in the Republican Reaction alliance, and getting involved in the failed military revolt of 1922, known as the Copacabana Fort revolt.

During the 1922 presidential election, fake letters with offensive content directed at Hermes da Fonseca, where he was called "a sergeant without composure", were attributed to Artur Bernardes, which caused immense turmoil in those elections.

Fonseca's arrest was then ordered by president Epitácio Pessoa on 2 July 1922. The following day he was released by order of the same president Epitácio. Arrested again on July 5, accused of conspiracy in the revolt that began on that date in Rio de Janeiro, he spent six months in prison, released on habeas corpus in January 1923. Sick, he retired to Petrópolis, staying with his in-laws, the barons of Tefé. There he died on 9 September 1923. He was buried in the city's cemetery.
