= The Stones (band) =

New Zealand band

- Origin: Dunedin, New Zealand
- Genres: Rock
- Labels: Flying Nun
- Past members: Jeff Batts, Wayne Elsey, Graeme Anderson

The Stones were a New Zealand band from Dunedin named after the Rolling Stones. One of the earliest bands to record on the Flying Nun label, they helped form the style of music known as the Dunedin sound, along with label mates such as the Chills, the Verlaines and Sneaky Feelings, all of whom appeared alongside the Stones on the seminal Flying Nun release the Dunedin Double EP.

The band was a three-piece with Jeff Batts (bass, vocals), Wayne Elsey (vocals, guitar), Graeme Anderson (drums).

Whereas the other three bands to appear on this record went on to increased fame both in New Zealand and overseas, the Stones split up not long after its release, although all members of the band went on to success in other local bands. Most important of these was Wayne Elsey's time in the DoubleHappys, a band which itself led to the formation of Straitjacket Fits.

== Discography ==
Date of Release	Title	Label	Charted	Certification	Catalog Number
EPs
1982	Dunedin Double	Flying Nun Records	-	-	DUN 1
1983	Another Disc, Another Dollar	Flying Nun Records	33	-	BUCK 001
