= Light Reflections =

- Origin: São Paulo, SP, Brazil
- Genres: Pop music
- Years active: 1972-1981
- Labels: Copacabana, Cash Box Records, Quatro, EMI
- Past members: Brian Anderson: Marc Mane; Billy Rogers; Ricky Taylor

Light Reflections was a Brazilian band that performed in the 1970s.

== Biography ==
The band appeared in 1972 in São Paulo under the name Tobruk, and was formed by André Barbosa Filho (vocals and guitar, used the pseudonym Brian Anderson), Marc Mane (organ and guitar), Ricky Taylor (bass, piano and moog) and Billy Rogers (drums). By contractual requirement, the group sang in English.

His greatest success was Tell Me Once Again, and it sold one million copies of the LP One Way, released in 1973, in addition to several shows in Latin America. Another hit of the group was Welcome, Welcome. In their career, Light Reflections recorded 2 LPs and 8 singles.

== Discography ==
=== Album ===
1973 - One Way

=== Singles & EPs ===
- 1972 - Tell Me Once Again
- 1973 - Welcome, Welcome
- 1974 - Dime Una Vez Más / Mía Solo Mía
- 1974 - Light Reflections
- 1974 - My Great Love
- 1974 - My Great Love (EP)
- 1975 - Sweet Love/Please
- 1981 - Let's Fall In Love

=== Compilations ===
- 1999 - The Essential Of
