= A Sentimental Education (Rod Jones album) =

Studio album by Rod Jones
- Released: 2010
- Recorded: Leith, Edinburgh
- Genres: Indie rock, indie folk
- Label: Self-released
- Producer: Rod Jones

Rod Jones chronology
A Sentimental Education (2010)	A Generation Innocence (2012)

A Sentimental Education is the debut studio album by Idlewild guitarist Rod Jones, self-released in February 2010 and on Borough Music in April 2010. The album was mixed by regular Idlewild producer Dave Eringa.

The limited-edition version of the album was available to pre-order on Jones' official website in late 2009 and contained "exclusive artwork, two exclusive bonus tracks, and all participants will have their name in the album."

== Track listing ==
1. "Sing it Alone"
2. "Wonderful"
3. "Taking You to Heart"
4. "Sing Your Praises"
5. "Black is the Colour"
6. "Past Passes By"
7. "Paint the Sky"
8. "A Pirate Song"
9. "Your Deaf Heart"
10. "No Sound"
11. "Broken Flowers"
12. "The Longingness of Time"

=== Pre-order bonus tracks ===
- "Christmas Fire"
- "Rhythm is a Dancer"

== Personnel ==
=== Musicians ===
- Rod Jones - vocals, guitar, bass, keyboards
- Jacqueline Irvine - viola, vocals
- Catrin Pryce-Jones - violin
- Jack Nicholson - drums, percussion
- Josef Sykora - additional keyboards
- Amber Wilson - vocals

=== Recording personnel ===
- Rod Jones - recording, producer
- Dave Eringa - mixing
- Ed - mastering

=== Artwork ===
- Kamilla Kowalczyk - photography
