= Send You =

Studio album by Sneaky Feelings
- Released: July 1984
- Recorded: May–August 1983
- Label: Flyling Nun
- Producer: Phil Yule; Sneaky Feelings

Sneaky Feelings chronology
| Dunedin Double (1982) | Send You (1984) | Take Sides (1985) |

Send You is the first studio album by Sneaky Feelings. It was released in 1984 via Flying Nun Records.

== Production ==
The album was recorded in four days, in a minimalist fashion.

== Critical reception ==
Professional ratings
Review scores
| Source | Rating |
|---|---|
| AllMusic | 4/5 stars |

AllMusic wrote that the album "makes a strong case that Sneaky Feelings were among the best pop bands of the '80s, no matter what part of the world they came from or what label released their records." PopMatters wrote that "the deft songwriting of Send You is not entirely showcased considering the label’s limited recording resources at the time, so most of the multi-tracked harmonies on display ... are unfortunately obscured." Perfect Sound Forever wrote that Send You "remains a gem, with songs like 'Throwing Stones' and 'Someone Else's Eyes' crystallizing the (often oversimplified) notion of a 'Dunedin Sound,' an identifiable jangle that hearkened back to the great guitar pop of the '60's."

== Track listing ==
Side A
| No. | Title | Lead vocals | Length |
|---|---|---|---|
| 1. | "Waiting for Touchdown" | Pine | 3:44 |
| 2. | "Throwing Stones" | Pine | 4:33 |
| 3. | "Strangers Again" | Durrant | 3:25 |
| 4. | "Someone Else's Eyes" | Bannister | 3:26 |

Side B
| No. | Title | Lead vocals | Length |
|---|---|---|---|
| 1. | "Not to Take Sides" | Bannister | 4:48 |
| 2. | "P.I.T. Song" | Pine | 5:49 |
| 3. | "Won't Change" | Pine | 3:38 |
| 4. | "Everything I Want" | Pine | 3:44 |
| Total length: | | | 33:07 |

1992 CD version bonus tracks
| No. | Title | Length |
|---|---|---|
| 1. | "Not to Take Sides (Reprise)" | 1:38 |
| 2. | "Ready or Not" | 3:52 |
| 3. | "Cry You Out of My Eyes" | 3:27 |
| 4. | "Maybe You Need to Come Back" | 4:16 |
| Total length: | | 46:20 |

== Personnel ==
- Kat Tyrie – bass guitar, organ
- Martin Durrant – drums, vocals, synthesizer
- Matthew Bannister – guitar, vocals, organ
- David Pine – guitar, vocals, vibraphone
- Andrew Hubbard – percussion
