= Nair de Teffé =

Brazilian aristocrat, painter, singer and pianist

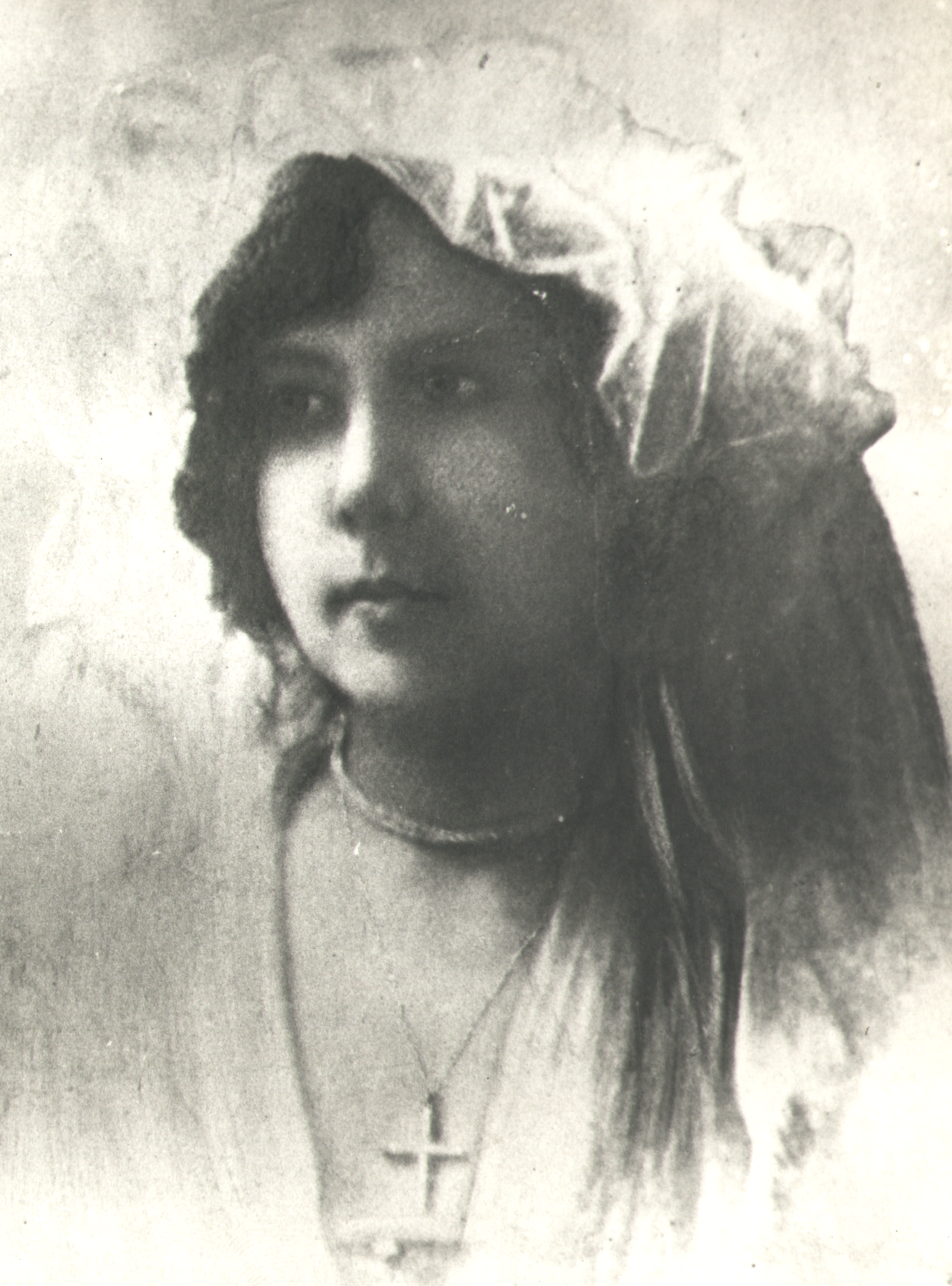

First Lady of Brazil
- In role 8 December 1913 – 15 November 1914
- President: Hermes da Fonseca
- Preceded by: Orsina Francioni da Fonseca
- Succeeded by: Maria Carneiro Pereira Gomes

Personal details
- Born: 10 June 1886 Petrópolis, Rio de Janeiro, Empire of Brazil
- Died: 10 June 1981 (aged 95) Rio de Janeiro, Rio de Janeiro, Brazil
- Spouse: Hermes da Fonseca
- Occupation: Cartoonist, painter, singer

Nair de Teffé von Hoonholtz, mostly known as Nair de Teffé (10 June 1886 – 10 June 1981), was a Brazilian aristocrat, painter, singer and pianist, having been notably the first female cartoonist in the world. Married to Marshal Hermes da Fonseca, she was the First Lady of Brazil during the last year of her husband's presidency, from 1913 to 1914. She is to date the longest-lived of the first ladies of Brazil, and the woman who held the position of ex-first lady the longest, lasting 67 years.

== Biography ==
=== Family and aristocratic background ===
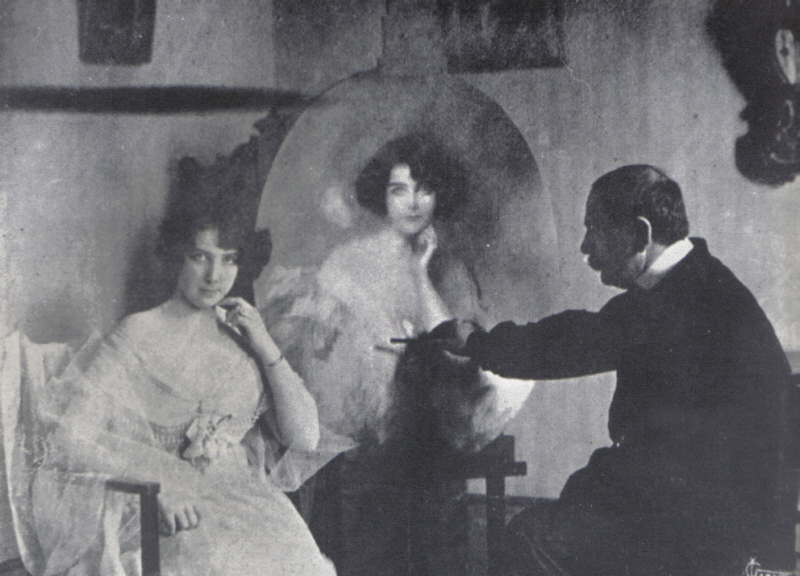
Nair being painted by the French paintor Guirand de Scevola.

Nair was born in Petrópolis, Empire of Brazil, on 10 June 1886, being the daughter of admiral Antônio Luiz von Hoonholtz, the 1st Baron of Teffé, and his wife Maria Luiza Dodsworth, Baroness of Teffé. Nair had three brothers: Álvaro, Oscar and Octávio. By her father's side, Nair was the granddaughter of Friedrich Wilhelm von Hoonholtz, Count von Hoonholtz, a Prussian military officer who served in the Imperial Brazilian Army, while by her mother's side she was niece to Jorge João Dodsworth, the 2nd Baron of Javary and cousin to Maria Leocádia Dodsworth, Countess of Frontin. She was aunt to Maria Luiza de Teffé, Marchioness of Berlingieri, and great-aunt to the Italian-Brazilian actor Anthony Steffen (born Antônio Luiz de Teffé von Hoonholtz).

An aristocrat from birth, Nair grew attending events of the Brazilian court in Rio de Janeiro and on her native town of Petrópolis, summer residence of the Brazilian Imperial Family, frequenting the imperial palaces and having met several personalities such as Emperor Pedro II of Brazil.

=== Cartoonism ===
As a young girl, Nair studied in Paris and Nice, returning to Brazil in 1906. In 1909, she published her first work in Fon-Fon magazine, under the pseudonym of Rian ("Nair" backwards). Her caricatures were also published in, among others, the magazines O Binóculo, A Careta, O Malho, as well as the newspapers Gazeta de Notícias and Gazeta de Petrópolis. She had an agile hand which transmitted people's characters quite well. Her caricatures, often political, featured political figures and the old imperial aristocracy, and were attacked by the elite as much for their content as for their author. Nair stopped working as a cartoonist in 1913 when she married the then Brazilian President, Marshal Hermes da Fonseca.

=== Life as First Lady ===
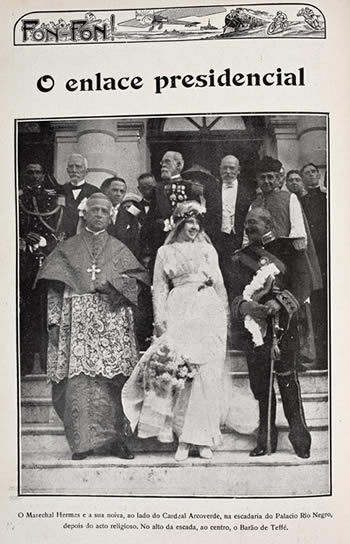
Nair and Hermes next to Cardinal Arcoverde following their marriage.

Nair de Teffé was and still is commonly regarded as a woman ahead of her time. After marrying the President and becoming First Lady of Brazil in 8 December 1913, Nair used her position to host soirées in the Catete Palace, the presidential palace, which became famous for introducing the guitar in high society salons.

In 1914, Nair de Teffé organized a recital to launch Corta Jaca, a maxixe composed by Chiquinha Gonzaga. The following day, controversy and criticism developed because the presidential palace had promoted and disseminated music that had its roots in what the social elite believed were lascivious and vulgar dances. Bringing popular music to the presidential palace was considered at the time to be a breach of protocol, causing controversy in the highest ranks of Brazilian society and politics. Ruy Barbosa, one of the founders of the First Brazilian Republic, had strong criticism about the wife of the president.

=== Post-presidency and later life ===
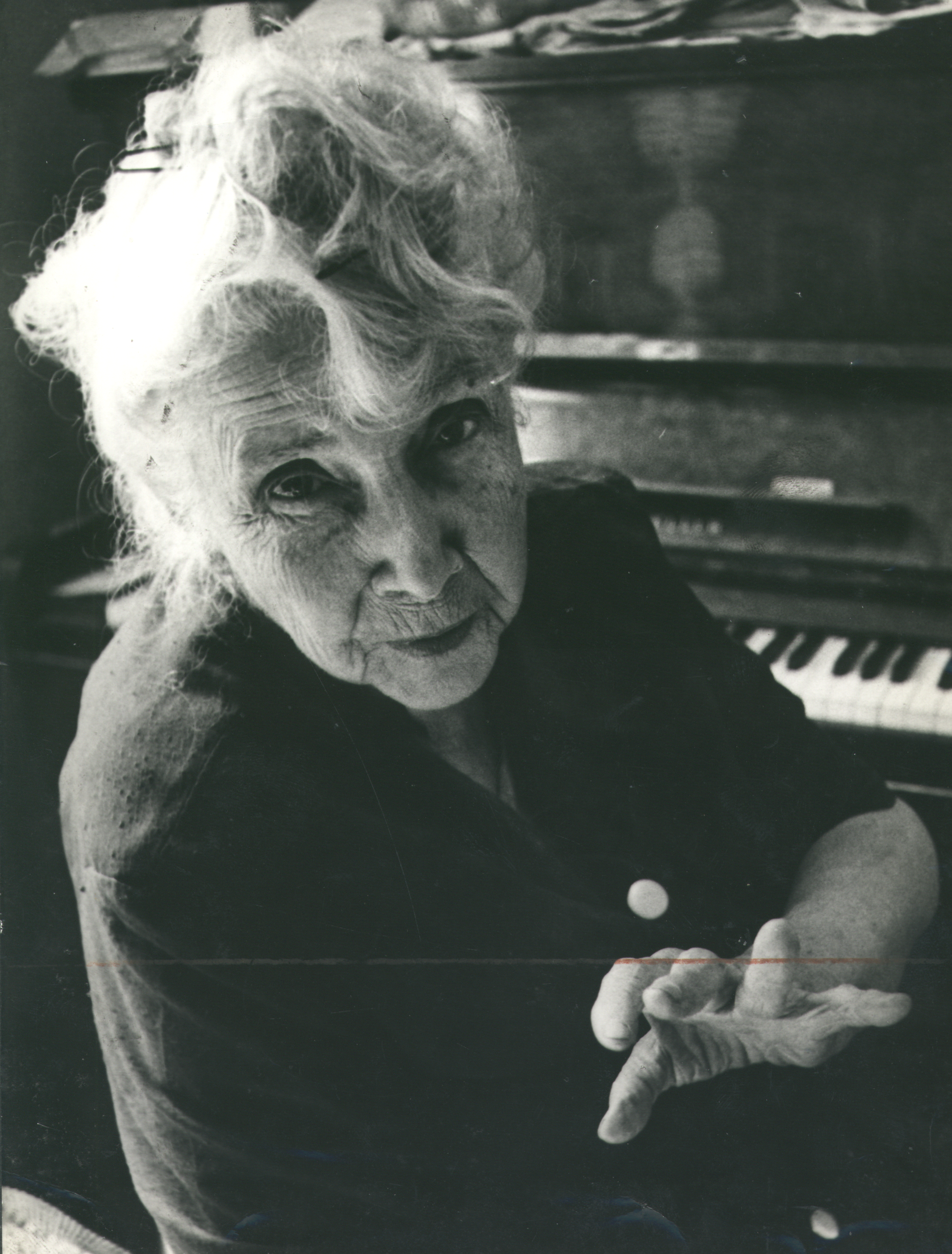
Nair de Teffé in 1970

After her husband's presidential mandate ended, she moved to Europe, living in Switzerland with her husband until 1921, when the couple returned to Brazil following the First World War. In 1922, Nair participated of the Modern Art Week. Returning to Petrópolis, in 1928 she was elected President of the Academy of Sciences and Letters. In 1932 she founded a theater, Cinema Rian, which had a privileged location (facing the sea of Copacabana). Afterwards, Nair started playing at casinos and lost a great part of her fortune, as well as an island in the coastline of Angra dos Reis. Eventually she settled in Niterói and adopted three children: Carmem Lúcia, Tânia and Paulo Roberto.

In 1959, at the age of 73, Nair de Tefé resumed making caricatures. In the late 1970s, she still participated in commemorations of International Women's Day. She died in Rio de Janeiro on the exact day of her 95th birthday from pulmonary infection aggravated by a cardiac insufficiency.
