= Okay My Gay =

Studio album by João Penca e Seus Miquinhos Amestrados
- Released: 1986
- Genres: New wave, rockabilly, doo-wop, comedy rock, surf music, rock and roll
- Label: RCA Records
- Producer: Ronaldo Bastos

João Penca e Seus Miquinhos Amestrados chronology
Os Maiores Sucessos de João Penca e Seus Miquinhos Amestrados (1983)	Okay My Gay (1986)	Além da Alienação (1988)

Okay My Gay is the second studio album by Brazilian new wave band João Penca e Seus Miquinhos Amestrados. It was released in 1986 by RCA Records.

It was the band's most commercially successful album, selling over 250,000 copies; another source states it had decent radio airplay but sold poorly. It spawned some of their most famous hits, such as "Popstar" (which acquired even bigger fame after being covered by Lulu Santos), "Lágrimas de Crocodilo", "Romance em Alto-Mar" and "Universotário".

The album cover, signed by Rico Mendes, shows a Cadillac diving into a wave. The car was inspired by the Cadillacs seen in some The Beach Boys album covers and the wave was a page from a calendar that Selvagem Big Abreu had at home.

The pictures inside the booklet were taken by Flávio Colker in Ipanema at 4am following a show. It was the only possible time of the day in which they would find the beach empty and sufficiently light.

The album's title is the answer the band would give to producer Ronaldo Bastos whenever he suggested they named the effort Pencomania.

== Background ==
"Luau de Arromba" is a tribute to the Brazilian musical scene of the 1980s, and its lyrics mention many singers and bands who were then popular.

"Ricota" was written by Edgard Scandurra, originally for Ultraje a Rigor; he made a guest appearance on the track by providing guitars.

"Romance em Alto-Mar" references in its lyrics the famous Lorelei legend and comic book character Namor the Sub-Mariner.

=== Covers/parodies ===
Every João Penca album features Portuguese-language covers/parodies of old 1940s/1950s rock and roll/rockabilly and 1960s surf music songs.

"Sou Fã"

A version of The Crests' "16 Candles".

"Os Amantes Nunca Dizem Adeus"

A cover of The Flamingos' "Lovers Never Say Goodbye".

"Cachet"

A version of Elvis Presley's "Heartbreak Hotel".

== Track listing ==
No.	Title	Lyrics	Length
1.	"Luau de Arromba" (Awesome Luau)	Leandro Verdeal, Selvagem Big Abreu	4:18
2.	"Popstar"	Leandro Verdeal	4:00
3.	"Romance em Alto-Mar" (High-Seas Romance)	Leandro Verdeal, Ronaldo Bastos	3:27
4.	"Lágrimas de Crocodilo" (Crocodile Tears)	Carlos Barmack, Leandro Verdeal	3:49
5.	"Sou Fã" (I'm Fond)	Avellar Love, Bob Gallo, Selvagem Big Abreu	3:03
6.	"Os Amantes Nunca Dizem Adeus" (Lovers Never Say Goodbye)	Ronaldo Bastos, Selvagem Big Abreu	4:54
7.	"Menino Prodígio" (Prodigy Boy)	Guto Barros, Léo Jaime	2:52
8.	"Cachet"	Léo Jaime	3:13
9.	"Celso Carlos"	Leandro Verdeal, Léo Jaime	3:36
10.	"Universotário^{[A]}"	Léo Jaime	2:21
11.	"Escrava Sexual" (Sex Slave)	Leandro Verdeal, Léo Jaime	3:37
12.	"Ricota" (Ricotta)	Edgard Scandurra	2:46

== Personnel ==
João Penca e Seus Miquinhos Amestrados

- Selvagem Big Abreu (Sérgio Ricardo Abreu) — vocals, electric guitar
- Avellar Love (Luís Carlos de Avellar Júnior) — vocals, bass
- Bob Gallo (Marcelo Ferreira Knudsen) — vocals, drums

Guest musicians

- Edgard Scandurra — guitars in "Ricota"

Miscellaneous staff

- Ronaldo Bastos — production

== Notes ==
A. Untranslatable pun with the words "universitário" ("college student") and "otário" ("sucker").
