= Sentimental Education (Sneaky Feelings album) =

Studio album by Sneaky Feelings
- Released: 1986
- Label: Flying Nun
- Producer: Phil Yule, Sneaky Feelings, Victor Grabic

Sneaky Feelings chronology
Take Sides (1985)	Sentimental Education (1986)	Waiting for Touchdown (1986)

Sentimental Education is an album by the New Zealand group Sneaky Feelings. First released as an LP in 1986, it was re-released with extra tracks as a CD the following year. Several of the extra tracks had previously been released as singles, including the band's biggest single, "'Husband House".

== Critical reception ==
Professional ratings
Review scores
Source	Rating
New Musical Express	7/10

In 1990, the Orange County Register included the album on its list of "essential New Zealand music of the past decade," noting the "Velvet Underground and Byrds influences and slimly produced records pulled off with a sense of spirit." Perfect Sound Forever wrote that Sentimental Education "was more ambitious [than the debut], but faltered in places due to misguided production."

== Track listing ==
Tracks marked with an asterisk were not on the original vinyl release.

Side A

1. All You've Done 2:37
2. I'm Not Going to Let Her Bring Me Down 3:04
3. Walk to the Square 3:14
4. Now 2:13
5. A Letter to You 4:04
6. Broken Man 4:58

Side B

1. It's So Easy 3:24
2. Trouble with Kay 1:58
3. Backroom 4:20
4. Coming True 3:22
5. Amnesia 3:51

Bonus tracks on European version (Flying Nun Europe – FNE 14CD - 1986).

1. Wasted Time
2. Wouldn't Cry*
3. Major Barbara*
4. Husband House*
5. The Strange and Conflicting Feelings of Separation and Betrayal*
6. Strangers Again*
7. Better Than Before*

== Notes ==
The version of "Backroom" released on this album is a completely different recording to that which had earlier been on the Dunedin Double EP. The version of "Amnesia" is also a different version to the original release of the song (as the B-side of the "Be My Friend" single).

== Personnel ==
- Martin Durrant – vocals, drums, organ, piano, vibraphone, midi controller (DMX), percussion
- David Pine – vocals, guitar, bass guitar
- John Kelcher – vocals, guitar, bass guitar, organ
- Matthew Bannister – vocals, guitar, organ, piano
