= Cem Anos de Rock n' Roll =

Studio album by João Penca e Seus Miquinhos Amestrados
- Released: 1990
- Genre: New wave, rockabilly, doo-wop, comedy rock, surf music, rock and roll
- Label: Eldorado
- Producer: João Penca e Seus Miquinhos Amestrados

João Penca e Seus Miquinhos Amestrados chronology
Sucesso do Inconsciente (1989)	Cem Anos de Rock n' Roll (1990)	A Festa dos Micos (1993)

Cem Anos de Rock n' Roll (Portuguese for "One Hundred Years of Rock n' Roll") is the fifth and last studio album by Brazilian new wave band João Penca e Seus Miquinhos Amestrados. It was released in 1990 by Eldorado.

== Background ==
The track "Suga-Suga" would be included in the soundtrack of the telenovela Vamp one year later.

"O Escorpião Escarlate" was originally featured in the soundtrack of the eponymous 1990 film, in which João Penca also made a cameo.

Lulu Santos, in his second collaboration with João Penca, provides guitars for the short instrumental piece "Morceau".

== Covers/parodies ==
Every João Penca album features Portuguese-language covers/parodies of old 1940s/1950s rock and roll/rockabilly and 1960s surf music songs.

"Papa Uma-ma"

A parody of The Rivingtons' "Papa-Oom-Mow-Mow".

"O Monstro"

A parody of The Contours' "Do You Love Me".

"Viver, Sonhar"

A version of Jerry Butler's "For Your Precious Love".

== Track listing ==
No.	Title	Lyrics	Length
1.	"Papa Uma-ma" (Eat One)	Bob Gallo, Marcelo Elo, Selvagem Big Abreu, Tony Wilson	2:13
2.	"Ma Beibe, Beibe"	Dodô Ferreira	3:11
3.	"O Guitarrista Romântico" (The Romantic Guitarist)	Instrumental	1:10
4.	"O Bom e Velho Rock n' Roll" (Good Old Rock n' Roll)	Selvagem Big Abreu	4:03
5.	"O Monstro" (The Monster)	Avellar Love, Bob Gallo, Selvagem Big Abreu	3:39
6.	"Suga-Suga" (Suck-Suck)	Avellar Love, Bob Gallo, Marcelo Elo, Selvagem Big Abreu, Van Santos	3:40
7.	"Mulheres" (Women)	Alex Madureira, Van Santos	3:18
8.	"Morceau" (Piece — feat. Lulu Santos)	Instrumental	0:32
9.	"Viver, Sonhar" (To Live, to Dream)	Orlando Moraes	2:45
10.	"Esse Meu Cabelo Rock" (This Rock Hair of Mine)	Dodô Ferreira	2:44
11.	"O Escorpião Escarlate" (The Scarlet Scorpion)	Bob Gallo, Guacira, Selvagem Big Abreu	3:38
12.	"John Holmes e a Guitarra Solitária" (John Holmes and the Lonely Guitar)	Instrumental	1:31

== Personnel ==
João Penca e Seus Miquinhos Amestrados

- Selvagem Big Abreu (Sérgio Ricardo Abreu) — vocals, electric guitar
- Avellar Love (Luís Carlos de Avellar Júnior) — vocals, bass
- Bob Gallo (Marcelo Ferreira Knudsen) — vocals, drums

Guest musicians

- Lulu Santos — guitars in "Morceau"
