= Cinema Rian =

General information
- Location: Avenida Atlântica 2965, Rio de Janeiro, Brazil
- Opened: 1932
- Demolished: 1983

The Cinema Rian (or Cine Rian) was a theatre in Rio de Janeiro, Brazil founded by artist and former first lady of Brazil Nair de Teffé in November 1932. The theatre was located in a well-to-do area on the Avenida Atlântica, Copacabana, facing the Atlantic Ocean. The theatre was considered one of the best-known in Rio de Janeiro before its demolition in 1983.

== History ==
Nair helped finance the construction of the theatre, but later sold the building to Luiz Severiano Ribeiro. The theatre's name came from Nair's pseudonym, Rian, simply her name spelled backwards.

The cinema was the focus of police during the 1957 showing of Elvis Presley's film Rock Around The Clock, when youths dancing in the aisles disrupted the showing of the movie and ultimately traffic in the avenue outside the theatre.

Cinema Rian hosted the 1965 Festival Internacional de Cinema.

The theatre was demolished on 16 December 1983 and was replaced by a hotel.
