= Kid Abelha =

Brazilian pop rock band

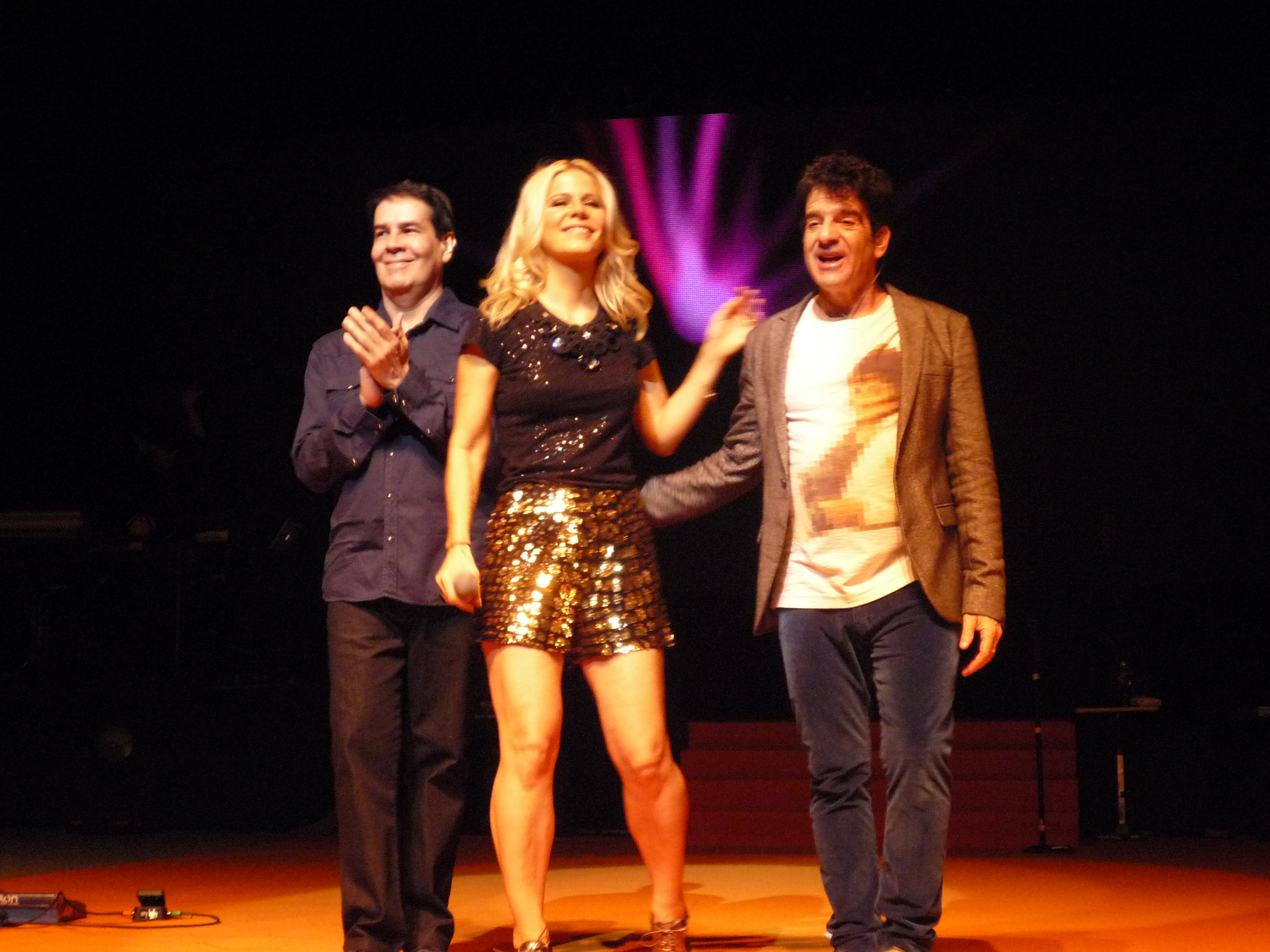
- Kid Abelha performing live in São Paulo, in 2012. Left to right: Bruno Fortunato, Paula Toller and George Israel.

Background information
- Origin: Rio de Janeiro, Brazil
- Genres: Pop rock; pop
- Years active: 1981–2015
- Labels: Warner, Universal
- Members: Paula Toller; George Israel; Bruno Fortunato
- Past members: Leoni; Beni Borja; Beto Martins; Richard Owens

Kid Abelha was a pop rock band from Rio de Janeiro, Brazil, formed by Paula Toller (lead vocals), George Israel (sax, guitar and vocals) and Bruno Fortunato (acoustic and electric guitar). The group has recorded 12 studio albums, 4 live albums and 3 live DVDs. They have created many songs which have entered into Brazilian pop-rock history. The group sold more than 8 million albums worldwide.

== History ==
A precursor group was formed by drummer Carlos Beni, Pedro Farah and Leoni, called "Chrisma". In 1981, Paula Toller meets Leoni in college, PUC-Rio, they start dating and then she used to visit the band rehearsals. The boys always asked her to join the band, but she denied a lot of times, saying she was too shy, but her constant visits to the rehearsals motivated her to sing. George Israel, otherwise, was seen playing saxophone in Búzios and invited by a friend of Leoni to meet the band. In 1982, with guitarist Beto Martins and American keyboardist Richard Owens they recorded a demo tape "Fixação" ("Fixation") and "Vida de cão é chato pra cachorro" ("Living like a dog is boring like hell"). Drummer Beni took the tape to radio station Fluminense FM; when asked the band's name, he took a piece of paper from his pocket that had the list of names considered by the group without reaching a consensus and read out the first one: Kid Abelha & os Abóboras Selvagens ("Kid Bee and the Wild Pumpkins"). Achieving success in the Rio underground scene, the two songs were released on the compilation album Rock Voador, with other new Brazilian rock bands. The band then recorded the single "Pintura Íntima"/"Por que não eu?", with more than 100,000 copies sold.

In 1984 the band released their first album, "Seu Espião" ("Your Spy"), which included, among others, the classic "Pintura Íntima" ("Private Painting"), "Fixação" ("Fixation") and "Como Eu Quero" ("How I Want"). With this LP, they received the first gold record of the new generation of Brazilian artists.

In 1985, the band performed at the first Rock in Rio, an experience described by the band as their "entrance exam" into the business.

In 1986 Leoni had an altercation with Léo Jaime that also involved Paula Toller, Leoni's wife Fabiana Kherlakian and Herbert Vianna. After being hit by Paula with a pandeiro, Leoni left the band.

== Discography ==
=== Studio albums ===
- (1984) Seu Espião
- (1985) Educação Sentimental
- (1987) Tomate
- (1989) Kid
- (1991) Tudo é Permitido
- (1993) Iê Iê Iê
- (1996) Meu Mundo Gira Em Torno de Você
- (1998) Autolove
- (1999) Espanhol
- (2000) Coleção
- (2001) Surf
- (2005) Pega Vida

=== Live albums ===
- (1986) Kid Abelha ao Vivo
- (1995) Meio Desligado
- (2002) Acústico MTV: Kid Abelha
- (2012) Multishow ao Vivo: Kid Abelha - 30 Anos

=== Compilations ===
- (1990) Greatest Hits 80's
- (1993) Geração Pop
- (1997) Remix
- (2001) E-Collection
- (2006) Warner 30 Anos

=== EPs/Singles ===
- (1983) "Pintura Íntima"/"Por Que Não Eu?"
- (1984) "Como Eu Quero"/"Homem Com Uma Missão"
- (1997) Kid Abelha Single

=== Singles ===
Year	Single	Charts				Album
Year	Single	SPA	USA	MEX	POR	Album
1982	"Distração" ("Distraction")	—	—	—	—	Rock Voador
1983	"Pintura Íntima" ("Intimate Painting")	—	—	—	—	Seu Espião
1984	"Como Eu Quero" ("How I Want")	—	—	—	—	Seu Espião
1984	"Nada Tanto Assim" ("Nothing So Much Like")	—	—	—	—	Seu Espião
1984	"Fixação" ("Fixation")	—	—	—	—	Seu Espião
1984	"Por Que Não Eu?" ("Why Not Me?")	—	—	—	—	Seu Espião
1985	"Alice (Não Me Escreva Aquela Carta de Amor)" ("Alice (Don't Write Me That Love Letter)")	—	—	—	—	Seu Espião
1985	"Educação Sentimental I" ("Sentimental Education I")	—	—	—	—	Educação Sentimental
1985	"Lágrimas e Chuva" ("Tears and Rain")	—	—	—	—	Educação Sentimental
1985	"A Fórmula do Amor" ("The Formula of Love")	—	—	—	—	Educação Sentimental
1986	"Garotos" ("Boys")	—	—	—	—	Educação Sentimental
1986	"Educação Sentimental II" ("Sentimental Education II")	—	—	—	—	Educação Sentimental
1986	"Os Outros" ("The Others")	—	—	—	—	Educação Sentimental
1986	"Nada Por Mim" ("Nothing for Me")	—	—	—	—	Kid Abelha ao Vivo
1987	"Tomate" ("Tomato")	—	—	—	—	Tomate
1987	"Amanhã é 23" ("Tomorrow is the 23rd")	—	—	—	—	Tomate
1987	"Me Deixa Falar" ("Let Me Speak")	—	—	—	—	Tomate
1988	"No Meio da Rua" ("In the Middle of the Street")	—	—	—	—	Tomate
1989	"Dizer Não é Dizer Sim" ("Saying No is Saying Yes")	—	—	—	—	Kid
1989	"Agora Sei" ("Now I Know")	—	—	—	—	Kid
1989	"Todo Meu Ouro" ("All My Gold")	—	—	—	—	Kid
1990	"De Quem é o Poder" ("Whose is the Power")	—	—	—	—	Kid
1991	"Grand Hotel"	—	—	—	—	Tudo é Permitido
1991	"No Seu Lugar" ("In Your Place")	—	—	—	—	Tudo é Permitido
1992	"Não Vou Ficar" ("I Won't Be", Roberto Carlos cover)	—	—	—	—	Tudo é Permitido
1993	"Em 92" ("In '92")	—	—	—	—	Iê Iê Iê
1993	"Deus (Apareça na Televisão)" ("God (Be on TV)")	—	—	—	—	Iê Iê Iê
1993	"Eu Tive um Sonho" ("I Had a Dream")	—	—	—	—	Iê Iê Iê
1995	"Solidão Que Nada" ("None of Loneliness")	—	—	—	—	Meio Desligado
1996	"Te Amo Pra Sempre" ("I Love You Forever")	—	—	—	—	Meu Mundo Gira em Torno de Você
1996	"Na Rua, Na Chuva, Na Fazenda" ("On the Streets, in the Rain, in a Farm", Hyldon cover)	—	—	—	—	Meu Mundo Gira em Torno de Você
1996	"Como é Que Eu Vou Embora?" ("How Am I Supposed to Leave?")	—	—	—	—	Meu Mundo Gira em Torno de Você
1997	"¿Por Qué Me Quedo Tan Sola?" ("Why Am I So Lonely?")	1	142	19	—	Espanhol
1997	"Te Amo Por Siempre"	6	89	28	—	Espanhol
1997	"Como Yo Quiero"	1	73	1	—	Espanhol
1997	"Pintura Íntima" (Remix version)	—	23	—	1	Remix
1998	"Eu Só Penso em Você" ("All I Think About is You")	—	—	—	18	Autolove
1998	"Maio" ("May")	—	—	—	1	Autolove
1999	"Ouvir Estrelas" ("Hearing Stars")	—	—	—	27	Autolove
2000	"Deve Ser Amor" ("It Must Be Love")	—	—	—	8	Coleção
2000	"Pare o Casamento" ("Stop This Wedding", Wanderléa cover)	—	—	—	1	Coleção
2000	"Pingos de Amor" ("Love Raindrops", Paulo Diniz cover)	—	—	—	10	Coleção
2001	"Eu Não Esqueço Nada" ("I Forget Nothing")	—	—	—	33	Surf
2001	"Eu Contra a Noite" ("Me Against the Night")	—	—	—	1	Surf
2002	"O Rei Do Salão" ("The King of the Ballroom")	—	—	—	47	Surf
2002	"Nada Sei" ("I Know Nothing")	—	—	—	1	Acústico MTV: Kid Abelha
2003	"Quero te Encontrar" ("I Wanna Meet You", Claudinho & Buchecha cover)	—	—	—	1	Acústico MTV: Kid Abelha
2003	"Lágrimas e Chuva" (Versão Acústico MTV)	—	—	—	13	Acústico MTV: Kid Abelha
2003	"Como Eu Quero" (Versão Acústico MTV)	—	—	—	3	Acústico MTV: Kid Abelha
2005	"Poligamia" ("Polygamy")	—	—	—	1	Pega Vida
2005	"Peito Aberto" ("Open Chest")	—	—	—	1	Pega Vida
2005	"Eu Tô Tentando" ("I'm Trying")	—	—	—	1	Pega Vida
2006	"Por Que Eu Não Desisto de Você" ("Why Don't I Give Up on You")	—	—	—	19	Pega Vida

== Videography ==
=== Video albums ===
- (2002) Acústico MTV: Kid Abelha
- (2005) Pega Vida ao Vivo
- (2012) Multishow ao Vivo: Kid Abelha - 30 Anos

=== Music videos ===
- Como Eu Quero (1984)
- Seu Espião (1984)
- Nada Tanto Assim (1984)
- Lágrimas e Chuva (1985)
- Os Outros (1985)
- Nada Por Mim (1986)
- Tomate (1987)
- Me Deixa Falar (1987)
- Agora Sei (1989)
- Grand Hotel (1991)
- No Seu Lugar (1991)
- Eu Tive Um Sonho (1993)
- Em Noventa e Dois (1993)
- Te Amo Pra Sempre (1996)
- Na Rua, Na Chuva, Na Fazenda (1996)
- ¿Porque Me Quedo Tán Sola? (1997)
- Eu Só Penso em Você (1998)
- Maio... (1998)
- Deve Ser Amor (2000)
- Eu Contra A Noite (2001)
- O Rei do Salão (2001)
- Eu Não Esqueço Nada (2001)
- Nada Sei (2002)
- Quero te Encontrar (2002)
- Poligamia (2005)
- Peito Aberto (2005)
- Pq Eu Não Desisto de Vc (2005)
- Eu Tou Tentando (2005)
