= Léo Jaime =

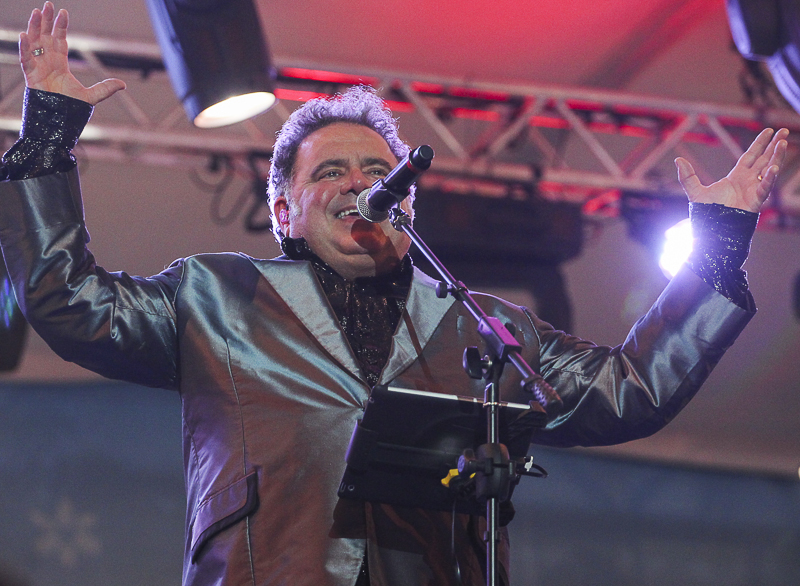
- Jaime at a FIFA Fan Fest in Taguatinga, during the run of the 2014 FIFA World Cup

Background information
- Born: Leonardo Jaime; April 23, 1960 (age 66); Goiânia, Goiás, Brazil
- Genres: Rockabilly, new wave, pop rock
- Occupations: Singer-songwriter, guitarist, actor, writer
- Instruments: Vocals, electric guitar, classical guitar
- Years active: 1977–present
- Website: http://www.leojaime.com.br/

Leonardo "Léo" Jaime (born April 23, 1960) is a Brazilian singer-songwriter, guitarist, actor and writer, famous for being one of the founding members of the rockabilly band João Penca e Seus Miquinhos Amestrados.

== Biography ==
Léo Jaime was born in Goiânia, Goiás, in 1960. In 1977, when he was 17 years old, he moved to São Paulo to take acting classes, but later abandoned his studies and went to Rio de Janeiro; there, he had a number of short-term jobs, including as a bartender and as a clothes salesman, before he embraced the musical career and founded the band Zoo (which would be renamed João Penca e Seus Miquinhos Amestrados in 1982) alongside Selvagem Big Abreu, Avellar Love, Cláudio Killer and Bob Gallo; however, he left the band in 1984 to pursue a solo career, releasing eight studio albums as of 2008 and collaborating with bands and singers such as Eduardo Dussek, Barão Vermelho (Jaime was originally invited to be the band's vocalist shortly after his departure from João Penca, but declined the offer claiming that his voice was "too soft" for the band's musical style and suggested they picked Cazuza instead), Leoni, Kid Abelha and Metrô. His second studio album, Sessão da Tarde, sold over 160,000 copies.

In 1985 Jaime began to pursue a career as an actor as well; his debut film was Ivan Cardoso's As Sete Vampiras, to which he also contributed an eponymous song to the soundtrack. Afterwards he appeared in and contributed to the soundtrack of Lael Rodrigues' Rock Estrela, and also provided the singing voice of Dodger in the Brazilian Portuguese dub of Oliver & Company. He reached higher prominence after starring in the telenovela Bebê a Bordo in 1988, and subsequently would also appear in O Profeta, in the sitcom Toma Lá, Dá Cá and in the long-running soap opera Malhação. He was one of the hosts of the talk show Saia Justa from January to February 2014, alongside Dan Stulbach, Eduardo Moscovis and Xico Sá, and was Fernanda Lima's music director, bandleader and sidekick for the first eight seasons of Amor e Sexo. He also starred in the theater plays Vítor e Vitória, alongside Marília Pêra, and Era no Tempo do Rei, based on Ruy Castro's eponymous work, portraying King John VI of Portugal (a role he would reprise in the 2017 telenovela Novo Mundo). From 2015 to 2018 he hosted the talk show Papo de Segunda on GNT, alongside Xico Sá, João Vicente de Castro and Marcelo Tas.

In his first role as a voice actor since 1988, and as a film actor overall since 1990, Jaime provided the voice of Anger in the Brazilian Portuguese dub of Pixar's 2015 film Inside Out.

Jaime is also a writer, and has written articles for magazines and newspapers such as O Globo, O Dia and Capricho, as well as for TV shows such as Domingão do Faustão and Megatom. His first book, Cabeça de Homem, was published in 2014 by Editora Agir.

In 2015 Jaime released Nada Mudou, a box set containing his first five albums (which were all out of print) re-released under CD format, all of them remastered and containing bonus tracks.

Late in life Jaime became obese due to panhypopituitarism, a rare disease which decreases the secretion of most of his pituitary hormones; he was diagnosed with the condition circa 1992, after suffering a traumatic brain injury in a motorcycle accident of which he eventually recovered. In a 2013 interview, he stated he was 1.77 meters tall and weighed 120 kilos, what would put him in Obese Class II category according to the BMI Table.

He married psychologist Daniela Lux Jaime in 2004 and has with her a son, David (b. 2008).

== Discography ==
=== With João Penca e Seus Miquinhos Amestrados ===
- 1983: Os Maiores Sucessos de João Penca e Seus Miquinhos Amestrados
- 1989: Sucesso do Inconsciente (additional vocals on the track "S.O.S. Miquinhos")

=== Solo ===
- 1984: Phodas "C"
- 1985: Sessão da Tarde
- 1986: Vida Difícil
- 1988: Direto do Meu Coração pro Seu
- 1989: Avenida das Desilusões
- 1990: Sexo, Drops e Rock n' Roll
- 1995: Todo Amor
- 2008: Interlúdio
- 2015: Nada Mudou (box set)

=== As a session member ===
Eduardo Dussek

- 1983: Cantando no Banheiro (guitar and backing vocals in "Rock da Cachorra"; with João Penca e Seus Miquinhos Amestrados)

Metrô

- 1985: Olhar (guitar and backing vocals in "Cenas Obscenas"; guitar in "Johnny Love")

== Bibliography ==
- 2014: Cabeça de Homem (ISBN 9788522030613)

== Filmography ==
=== Film ===
- 1985: As Sete Vampiras – Bob Rider
- 1985: Rock Estrela – Tavinho
- 1988: Oliver & Company – Dodger (singing voice only)
- 1990: O Escorpião Escarlate – Jarbas
- 2015: Inside Out – Anger (voice only)

=== Television ===
- 1988: Bebê a Bordo – Zezinho
- 2006: O Profeta – Caruso (1 episode)
- 2008: Toma Lá, Dá Cá – Tavares (1 episode)
- 2009: Caras & Bocas – presenter (2 episodes)
- 2012–2015: Malhação – Nando Rocha
- 2017: Novo Mundo – King John VI of Portugal
