= Paula Toller =

Brazilian singer-songwriter (born 1962)

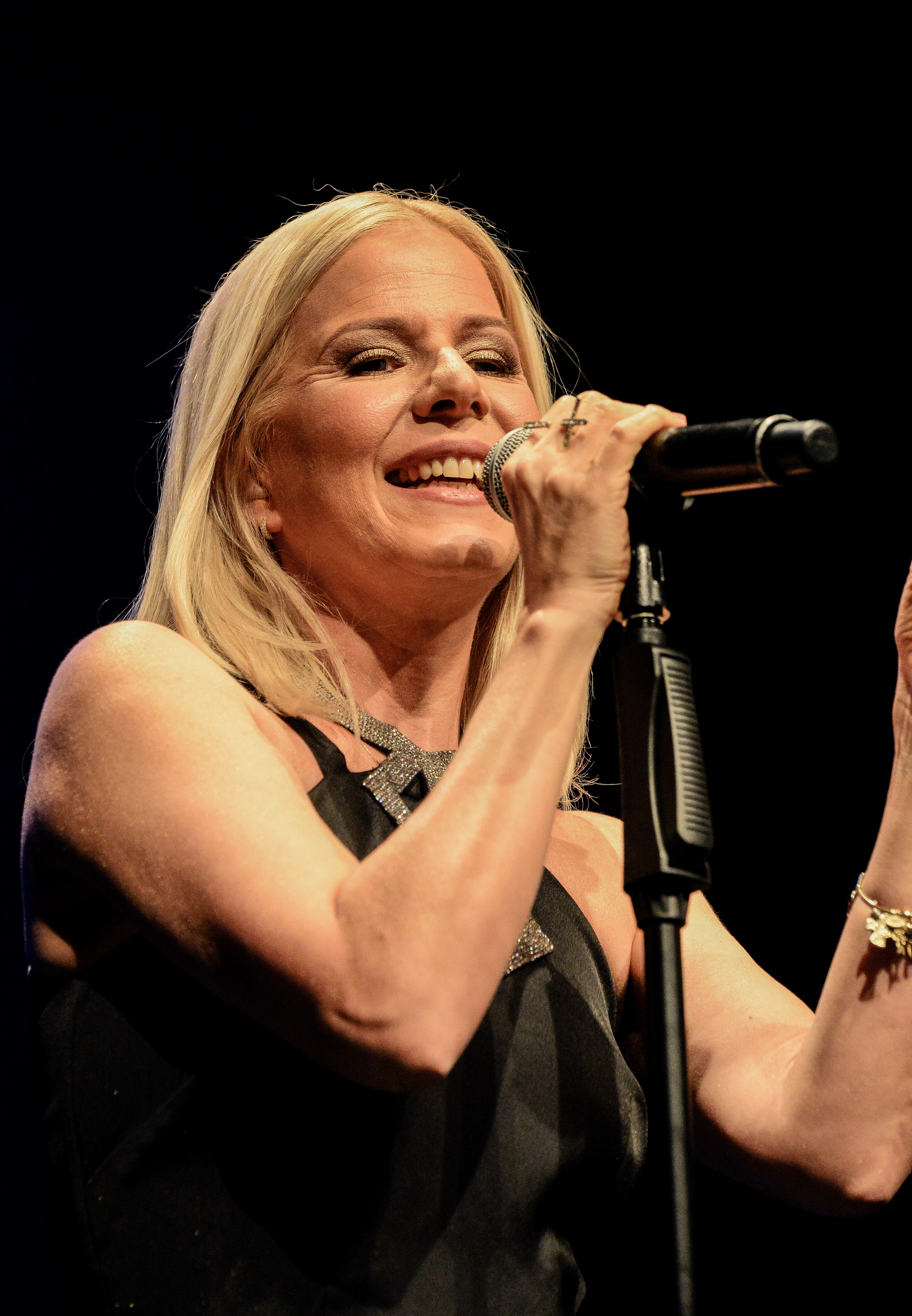

Background information
- Born: August 23, 1962 (age 64)
- Origin: Copacabana, Rio de Janeiro, Rio de Janeiro, Brazil
- Genres: Pop; pop rock; MPB
- Occupations: Singer, songwriter
- Years active: 1982–present
- Label: Warner Music Brasil Posto 9/Microservice • Som Livre
- Formerly of: Kid Abelha
- Website: PaulaToller.com

Paula Toller (born on August 23, 1962) is a Brazilian singer and songwriter. Toller is most known as the lead singer of Kid Abelha. In 1998, she released her self-titled first solo album, which was very well received. Her second solo album, titled SóNós, was released in 2007.

== Biography ==
Paula Toller was born on August 23, 1962, in Rio de Janeiro. She grew up in Copacabana, a traditional borough of Rio de Janeiro. Paula studied ballet and English.

Paula was raised by her paternal grandparents, Paulo and Renée. Paulo was a retired surgeon, historian, author, diver, ex-presidential aide of Brazil, and senior political adviser for the government of the former State of Guanabara. Renée was a homemaker and the manager of a boarding house for elderly women.

In her infancy and adolescence, the predominant music in her home was that of Bach, Mozart, Beethoven, and Chopin, among other classical performers. On the more modern side, she also listened to the music of Carmen Miranda, Elis Regina and The Beatles. In school, Paula took ballet and English classes and had the intention of becoming an English professor.

At the age of 17, she began taking courses in Industrial Design and Visual Communication at the Pontifícia Universidade Católica of Rio de Janeiro (PUC) and started studying French. In conjunction with her course work, she did an internship in a visual programming office where she would put into practice the things she learned in school. In the meanwhile, she would arrange side jobs to complement her small salary. Her side jobs included translating books and term papers for her fellow students, assuming the position of secretary in her dance studio during the holidays and revised her grandfather's books. In her brother's room, she heard for the first time James Brown and Tim Maia.

The first discs she bought were the soundtracks of her favorite telenovelas (which included songs by Stevie Wonder, Marcos Valle, and the Jackson Five). After that, she got interested in Janis Joplin and Rita Lee. She would often go to small parties called "Arrastas" where they would play artists like Led Zeppelin, Pink Floyd, Billy Paul, Michael Jackson. Once in the university, she became addicted to listening to the radio.

By 1982, she was already singing in the group Kid Abelha, and two years later, she gave up on school right before reaching graduation. In the same year, she began taking voice lessons with a professor and lyrical singer Vera Maria do Canto e Mello and started singing Lieder (songs) in German, which awoke her interest in the language that she still studies today.

In February 2016, it was announced that the singer, together with the band Os Paralamas do Sucesso and singers Nando Reis and Pitty, would take part of a tour promoted by the project Nivea Viva!, which takes place every year and takes artists on Brazilian tours. The series of 7 shows will pay tribute to Brazilian rock.

== Discography ==
=== Albums ===
| Title | Details |
|---|---|
| Paula Toller | Released: 1998; Label: Warner Music; Format: CD |
| SóNós | Released: June 28, 2007; Label: Warner Music; Format: CD |
| Nosso | Released: December 2, 2008; Label: Posto 9 Música; Format: CD, DVD, download digital |
| Transbordada | Released: December 29, 2014; Label: Som Livre; Format: CD, download digital |

=== Singles ===
List of singles as lead artist, with selected chart positions, showing year released and album name
| Year | Title | Peak chart positions | | Album |
| Year | Title | BRA | POR | Album |
|---|---|---|---|---|
| 1998 | "Derretendo Satélites" | 15 | 55 | Paula Toller |
| 1998 | "Fly Me to the Moon" | 44 | — | Paula Toller |
| 1999 | "1800 Colinas" | 25 | 49 | Paula Toller |
| 2000 | "Quem Tome Conta de Mim" | 29 | — | Non-album single |
| 2007 | "Barcelona 16" | 17 | 43 | SóNós |
| 2007 | "? (O Que É Que Eu Sou)" | 37 | — | SóNós |
| 2008 | "Eu Quero ir Pra Rua" | 30 | — | SóNós |
| 2008 | "Meu Amor se Mudou pra Lua" | 11 | 45 | Nosso |
| 2009 | "Nada Por Mim" | 1 | 32 | Nosso |
| 2009 | "Saúde/Só Love" | 26 | — | Nosso |
| 2014 | "Calmaí" | 64 | — | Transbordada |
