= List of Rolling Stone Brasil 100 Greatest Brazilian Music Records =

The 100 greatest Brazilian music records list was chosen by voting held by the Rolling Stone Brasil magazine published in October 2007.

== Voting ==
The choice of the "100 greatest" was based on the sum of votes of 60 scholars, producers and Brazilian music journalists. Each of the voters chose 20 albums, in no order of preference, which according to Rolling Stone, should be based on criteria like "intrinsical artistic value and historical importance, that is, how much the album influenced other artists."

== The list ==
List of Rolling Stone 100 Greatest Brazilian Music Records
Number	Title	Year	Artists
1	Acabou Chorare	1972	Novos Baianos
2	Tropicalia ou Panis et Circencis	1968	Caetano Veloso, Gilberto Gil, Gal Costa, Tom Zé, Os Mutantes, Nara Leão, Torquato Neto, Capinam, Rogério Duprat
3	Construção	1971	Chico Buarque
4	Chega de Saudade	1959	João Gilberto
5	Secos & Molhados	1973	Secos & Molhados
6	A Tábua de Esmeralda	1974	Jorge Ben
7	Clube da Esquina	1972	Milton Nascimento & Lô Borges
8	Cartola	1976	Cartola
9	Os Mutantes	1968	Os Mutantes
10	Transa	1972	Caetano Veloso
11	Elis & Tom	1974	Elis Regina and Tom Jobim
12	Krig-ha, Bandolo!	1973	Raul Seixas
13	Da Lama ao Caos	1994	Chico Science & Nação Zumbi
14	Sobrevivendo no Inferno	1997	Racionais MC's
15	Samba Esquema Novo	1963	Jorge Ben
16	Fruto Proibido	1975	Rita Lee & Tutti Frutti
17	Racional	1975	Tim Maia
18	Afrociberdelia	1996	Chico Science & Nação Zumbi
19	Cabeça Dinossauro	1986	Titãs
20	Fa-Tal - Gal A Todo Vapor	1971	Gal Costa
21	Dois	1986	Legião Urbana
22	A Divina Comédia ou Ando Meio Desligado	1970	Os Mutantes
23	Coisas (Moacir Santos album)	1965	Moacir Santos
24	Roberto Carlos Em Ritmo de Aventura	1967	Roberto Carlos
25	Tim Maia	1970	Tim Maia
26	Expresso 2222	1972	Gilberto Gil
27	Nós Vamos Invadir sua Praia	1985	Ultraje a Rigor
28	Roberto Carlos	1971	Roberto Carlos
29	Os Afro-Sambas	1966	Baden Powell e Vinicius de Moraes
30	A Dança da Solidão	1972	Paulinho da Viola
31	Carlos, Erasmo	1971	Erasmo Carlos
32	Pérola Negra	1973	Luiz Melodia
33	Caymmi e Seu Violão	1959	Dorival Caymmi
34	Lóki?	1974	Arnaldo Baptista
35	Estudando o Samba	1976	Tom Zé
36	Falso Brilhante	1976	Elis Regina
37	Caetano Veloso	1968	Caetano Veloso
38	Maria Fumaça	1977	Banda Black Rio
39	Selvagem?	1986	Os Paralamas do Sucesso
40	Legião Urbana	1985	Legião Urbana
41	Meus Caros Amigos	1976	Chico Buarque
42	Bloco do Eu Sozinho	2001	Los Hermanos
43	Refazenda	1975	Gilberto Gil
44	Mutantes (album)	1969	Os Mutantes
45	Raimundos	1994	Raimundos
46	Chaos A.D.	1993	Sepultura
47	João Gilberto	1973	João Gilberto
48	As Aventuras da Blitz	1982	Blitz
49	Tim Maia Racional Vol 2	1976	Tim Maia
50	Revolver	1975	Walter Franco
51	Clara Crocodilo	1980	Arrigo Barnabé
52	Cartola	1974	Cartola
53	Novo Aeon	1975	Raul Seixas
54	Refavela	1977	Gilberto Gil
55	Nervos de Aço	1973	Paulinho da Viola
56	Amoroso	1977	João Gilberto
57	Roots	1996	Sepultura
58	The Composer of Desafinado, Plays	1963	Tom Jobim
59	Canção do Amor Demais	1958	Elizeth Cardoso
60	Gil & Jorge: Ogum, Xangô	1975	Gilberto Gil e Jorge Ben
61	Fôrça Bruta	1970	Jorge Ben
62	MM	1989	Marisa Monte
63	Milagre dos Peixes	1973	Milton Nascimento
64	Show Opinião	1965	Nara Leão, João do Vale e Zé Kéti
65	Nelson Cavaquinho	1973	Nelson Cavaquinho
66	Cinema Transcendental	1979	Caetano Veloso
67	África Brasil	1976	Jorge Ben
68	Ventura	2003	Los Hermanos
69	Samba Esquema Noise	1994	Mundo Livre S/A
70	Getz/Gilberto	1963	João Gilberto, Stan Getz e Tom Jobim
71	Noel Rosa e Aracy de Almeida	1950	Aracy de Almeida
72	Jardim Elétrico	1971	Os Mutantes
73	Angela Ro Ro	1979	Angela Ro Ro
74	Õ Blésq Blom	1989	Titãs
75	Tim Maia	1971	Tim Maia
76	A Bad Donato	1970	João Donato
77	Canções Praieiras	1954	Dorival Caymmi
78	Gilberto Gil	1968	Gilberto Gil
79	Álibi	1978	Maria Bethânia
80	Gal Costa	1969	Gal Costa
81	Psicoacústica	1988	Ira!
82	O Inimitável	1968	Roberto Carlos
83	Matita Perê	1973	Tom Jobim
84	Qualquer Coisa/Jóia	1975	Caetano Veloso
85	Jovem Guarda	1965	Roberto Carlos
86	Beleléu, Leléu, Eu	1980	Itamar Assumpção e Banda Isca de Polícia
87	Verde, Anil, Amarelo, Cor-de-Rosa e Carvão	1994	Marisa Monte
88	Nada como um Dia após o Outro Dia	2002	Racionais MC's
89	Carnaval na Obra	1998	Mundo Livre S/A
90	Quem é Quem	1973	João Donato
91	Cantar	1974	Gal Costa
92	Wave	1967	Tom Jobim
93	Lado B Lado A	1999	O Rappa
94	Vivendo e Não Aprendendo	1986	Ira!
95	Doces Bárbaros	1976	Caetano Veloso, Gal Costa, Gilberto Gil e Maria Bethânia
96	A Sétima Efervescência	1997	Jupiter Apple
97	Araçá Azul	1973	Caetano Veloso
98	Elis	1972	Elis Regina
99	Revoluções por Minuto	1985	RPM
100	Circense	1980	Egberto Gismonti

== Statistics ==
Among the top 10, three albums were released in 1972, including the most voted Acabou Chorare, by the group Novos Baianos. Of the 25 best records, 14 were released in the 1970 decade. The artists with more than one record in the list are:

- Caetano Veloso, Gilberto Gil (7)
- Gal Costa, Jorge Ben, Os Mutantes, Tom Jobim (5)
- João Gilberto, Roberto Carlos, Tim Maia (4)
- Elis Regina (3)
- Cartola, Chico Buarque, Chico Science & Nação Zumbi, Dorival Caymmi, Ira!, João Donato, Los Hermanos, Legião Urbana, Nara Leão, Maria Bethânia, Marisa Monte, Milton Nascimento, Mundo Livre S/A, Paulinho da Viola, Racionais MC's, Raul Seixas, Sepultura, Titãs, Tom Zé (2)

== See also ==
- List of Discoteca Básica 500 Greatest Brazilian Music Records, a similar list of finest Brazilian albums which was released in 2022
- Rolling Stone Argentina's The 100 Greatest Albums of National Rock, a similar list from the Argentine edition of Rolling Stone which was also released in 2007
