= Fruto Proibido =

Studio album by Rita Lee and Tutti Frutti
- Released: 30 June 1975
- Recorded: April 1975
- Studios: Eldorado Studios, São Paulo, Brazil
- Genres: Glam rock; blues rock
- Length: 37:10
- Label: Som Livre
- Producer: Andy Mills

Rita Lee and Tutti Frutti chronology
Atrás do Porto Tem uma Cidade (1974)	Fruto Proibido (1975)	Entradas e Bandeiras (1976)

Fruto Proibido (Brazilian Portuguese pronunciation: [ˈfɾutu pɾojˈbidu], 'Forbidden Fruit') is the fourth studio album by Brazilian musician Rita Lee and the second with the band Tutti Frutti, released on 30 June 1975 through the label Som Livre. Seeking to reestablish her career after her 1972 dismissal from Os Mutantes, Lee joined Tutti Frutti the following year and released their first collaborative album, Atrás do Porto Tem uma Cidade (1974), which underperformed commercially. The group and Lee also faced creative constraints and neglect from their then-label, Philips, prompting them to leave and sign with Som Livre under executive João Araújo. American producer Andy Mills, known for his work as a sound engineer for Alice Cooper, was selected by Lee to helm the project.

Musically, the album blends glam rock and blues rock, with lyrics addressing themes such as parental disdain, farewells, longing for freedom, self-empowerment, and narratives referencing unabashed figures like naturist actress Luz del Fuego and dancer Isadora Duncan. Lee's vocals were noted for their youthful inflections, shifting from the sarcastic tone of her Os Mutantes era to a style conveying rebellion and vulnerability. Fruto Proibido marked Lee's desired artistic freedom, differing from her prior releases. She composed three of the nine tracks and was credited as a co-writer on all others.

The album marked a significant increase in Lee's commercial success, reaching number seven on the IBOPE music chart (as reported by Billboard) and was the first Brazilian rock album to surpass 50,000 copies sold. This made it the second-highest-selling album by a Brazilian female artist that year. To promote it, Lee appeared on TV programs like Fantástico, where a music video for "Agora Só Falta Você" debuted, and embarked on the Fruto Proibido Tour, which was praised for its stage production, sound quality, and costumes.

Fruto Proibido was well received by critics, with praise for Lee's vocals, instrumentation, lyrics, and more spontaneous artistic direction compared to her earlier work. Retrospectively, it is regarded as an important work in Lee's career and in the history of Brazilian rock, particularly in the context of female representation, both during the Brazilian military dictatorship and beyond. Contemporary artists like Manu Gavassi, Zélia Duncan, and Pitty have cited Fruto Proibido and its songs as an influence. The album was ranked 16th on Rolling Stone Brasil's "100 Greatest Brazilian Music Records" and listed among the best Latin American rock albums by the American edition of Rolling Stone.

== Background ==
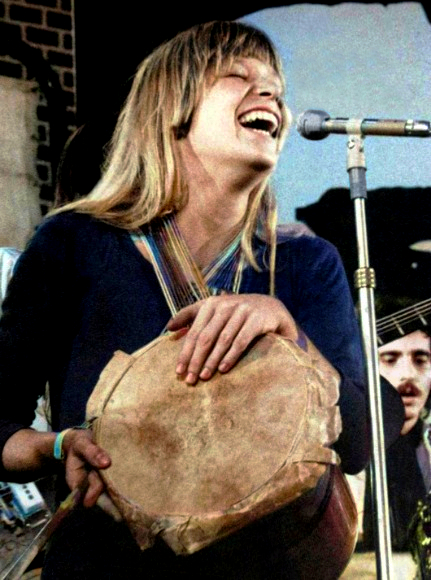
Lee performing with Os Mutantes, 1972

Rita Lee's music career rose during the tropicália movement as the vocalist of the Os Mutantes band formed in 1966, which included bassist and vocalist Arnaldo Baptista with whom she also developed a romantic relationship. Alongside the group, Lee released two solo albums: Build Up (1970) and Hoje É o Primeiro Dia do Resto da Sua Vida (1972). This occurred because executives at Philips Records, the band's label, did not want to invest in two Os Mutantes albums in a single year, opting instead to focus on Lee's charisma as a solo artist. In 1972, her marriage to Baptista ended, which together with creative differences manifested tension. Baptista and his brother, Sérgio Dias, believed the band should adopt a new aesthetic, moving toward progressive rock influenced by bands like Yes and Emerson, Lake & Palmer. According to Rita Lee: uma autobiografia [Rita Lee: an autobiography], the band ultimately kicked her out with Baptista announcing their decision: "We've decided that from now on, you're out of Os Mutantes because we've chosen to follow a progressive-virtuoso direction, and you don't have the caliber as an instrumentalist". Her departure from the group has been described inconsistently, with later interviews suggesting it was not voluntary.

"The group broke up for several reasons. Gil and Caetano had been exiled. Our gurus were gone. I suggested we make our own sound. After all, they had taught us everything—how to compose in Portuguese, arrange, and sing about Brazil. But the band decided to go in another direction. They chose to make progressive music like Yes, Emerson, Lake & Palmer. [...] Then suddenly, they invited me to leave Os Mutantes. With me, I think the humor left too."

— Lee on her departure from Os Mutantes.

After being expelled from Os Mutantes, Lee returned to live with her parents. In Rita Lee: Uma autobiografia, she reveals she considered inventing a story to explain her return but ultimately confessed: "They kicked me out of the band, and before loneliness threw me under a truck, I remembered you might take me back. I swear it's only for a little while." She settled in the family's basement, where she began to heal from the emotional wounds. Over time, she started writing songs, but the right opportunity or idea to present them eluded her. Over time, she started writing songs and eventually was presented with an opportunity to open for Os Mutantes in May 1973 at the Phono 73 festival organized by Phonogram Records. Lee, however, was hesitant to debut as a solo artist. She recruited guitarist Lúcia Turnbull, a friend from her Os Mutantes days, and named the project Cilibrinas do Éden. Their performance at the festival was met with initial apathy, which turned into boos. Lee attributed the poor reception to the "cutesy and silly" repertoire and the angel and fairy costumes they wore.

Despite attempts to sustain the project, Cilibrinas do Éden did not succeed. Lee then recruited members of the band Coqueiro Verde—guitarist Luis Sérgio Carlini, bassist Lee Marcucci, and drummer Emilson Colantonio—to back her and renamed them Tutti Frutti, a suggestion from writer Antônio Bivar who supported her during this new phase. She signed with Phonogram, a subsidiary of Philips, to release her first post-Os Mutantes album at the invitation of executive André Midani. However, a trip to Rio de Janeiro to attend recording sessions was unsuccessful due to Lee's drug use during the occasion, which displeased the label and led to the project's cancellation. Later, Lee confronted Midani in his office to reverse the decision, where she encountered singer Tim Maia, who was also dissatisfied because Phonogram had altered the cover of his upcoming album without his consent. After waiting to speak with Midani, they broke into his empty office and caused significant damage. Despite the fallout with Midani, Lee was given another chance by the label, and in 1974, her third album Atrás do Porto Tem Uma Cidade was released. Although it produced the hit "Mamãe Natureza", Lee and Tutti Frutti left PolyGram; Lee cited the label's neglect in the album's production and the unauthorized release of "Menino Bonito" as reasons for the strained relationship.

== Recording ==
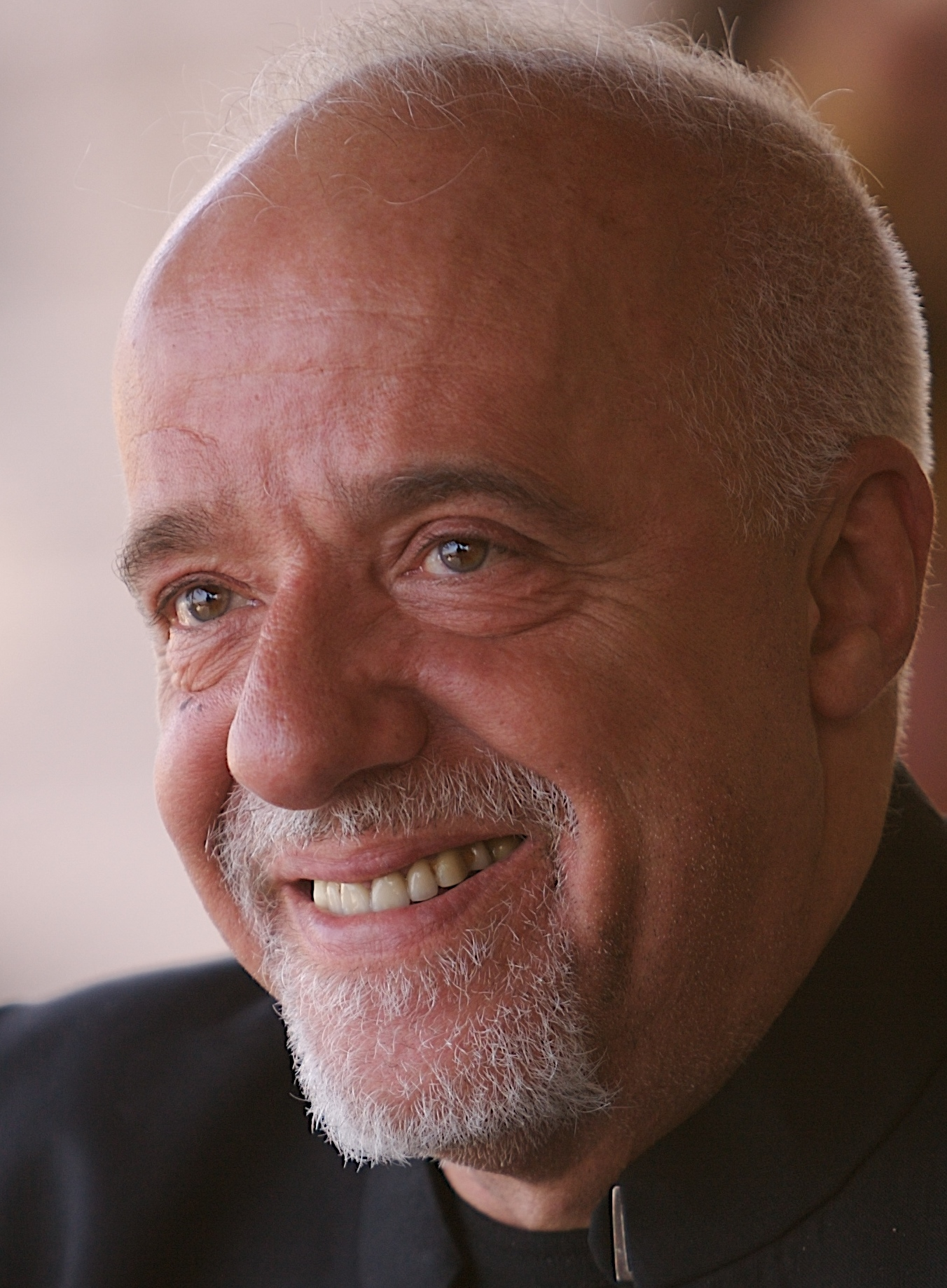
Paulo Coelho (pictured) is credited as a co-writer on three songs from Fruto Proibido.

After Lee and Tutti Frutti parted ways with Philips, they sought a new recording contract, gaining the interest of João Araújo, president of Som Livre and father of singer Cazuza. The group signed with the label, with Araújo guaranteeing them complete creative freedom for the project. However, Tutti Frutti was going through internal turmoil; Turnbull left due to constant clashes with Carlini and a general sense of machismo surrounding a woman playing guitar in a rock band. Colantonio, meanwhile, was replaced on drums by Franklin Paolillo. For the album's preparation, Lee moved to a borrowed house near the Ibiúna reservoir, where she spent several months living with the band members—and her two snakes—while they held daily rehearsals. The snakes were two boa constrictors stolen from American singer Alice Cooper during his 1974 performance in São Paulo. According to Lee, she was horrified when Cooper shook and stomped on a snake during the show, only for the animal to be retrieved by a crew member. She then "sweet-talked the security guard" and tracked down the person who took the snake. Upon finding them, she asked if Cooper "showed any noble feelings" toward the animal and was unsurprised by the negative response. There, she met Andy Mills, Cooper's sound engineer, with whom she immediately connected, and left with the snake used in the show and another, still a juvenile, that was being trained for Cooper's future performances. Mills and Lee developed a close relationship from then on, and he was invited by her to collaborate on the album's music production.

Most of the songs on Fruto Proibido were written by Lee, with a few exceptions; for "O Toque", "Cartão Postal", and "Esse Tal de Roque Enrow", she co-wrote with Paulo Coelho, who had recently ended his partnership with singer Raul Seixas. Two other tracks, "Pirataria" and "Agora Só Falta Você", were collaborations with Marcucci and Carlini, respectively. The recordings for Fruto Proibido took place in April 1975 at Eldorado Studios in São Paulo, the first studio in Brazil to feature a 16-channel mixing console. Years later, Mills recalled the process: "I kept everyone in the same room to capture a more live feel. I think that's what made the result sound fresh. The band was very tight, so we were able to capture magical moments." During the track selection, Carlini contributed to some songs, including an incomplete piece titled "Agora Só Falta Você", starting from its "melodic line and half the lyrics", and completing it with Lee. I went to Rita's house, and we finished it together". "Ovelha Negra" was one of the last songs to be finalized, as Carlini felt its arrangement was incomplete: "I thought about it so much that I dreamed the guitar solo and woke up whistling it". However, since the album was already in the mixing phase, the guitarist needed persistence and patience to convince Mills to include it. After many failed attempts, the producer finally took interest: "He told me, 'Did you say something about a solo for "Ovelha Negra"? Show me.' I picked up my guitar and played it. When I finished, everyone liked it."

== Composition ==
Music critics have categorized Fruto Proibido as a glam rock and blues rock recording with elements of hard rock. The recording features a wide range of instruments, including guitars, acoustic guitars, Minimoog, and synthesizers. Brazilian music academics Alexandre Saggiorato and Edemilson Antônio Brambilla note that the lyrics "do not seem to directly reference the political issues of the time but rather describe the ideals of most young people of the period, such as the search for freedom and rebellion against the established order—ideals not always directly linked to politics". Lee's vocals retain a youthful inflection, no longer in the mocking tone of her Os Mutantes days but now exuding rebellion and even suffering. The authors also note that Fruto Proibido features a recurring theme in Lee's work: paying homage to admirable and famous women in history. As a feminist who never sought to follow a strict ideology, Lee drew inspiration from women who had challenged societal norms and broken taboos. This artistic process would continue throughout her career, paying "tributes to pioneers who shook society, each in their own way". Saggiorato and Brambilla describe the album as a "string of interconnected beads, stitched together by classic rock and roll songs with powerful guitar riffs, but with one standout feature: the great mentor and performer of the album was a woman".

"Dançar pra não dançar" opens the album by recounting the story of American dancer and choreographer Isadora Duncan, a woman who broke dogmas and taboos, much like Lee herself. Duncan, as the song states, "made history by dancing as she pleased". She was a woman who sought freedom of movement, creative spirit, and life itself. The song's arrangement, featuring a guitar solo, aims to evoke a sense of psychedelic freedom, blending glam rock influences. The second track, "Agora Só Falta Você", tells the story of a woman who decides to "free herself" from a toxic relationship. From this moment, as the lyrics suggest, she pursues her personal dreams and finds joy in being herself, as evident in the lines: "In the air I breathe / I feel pleasure / in being who I am / in being where I am." Notably, despite her elevated self-esteem, she still seeks love and romance, though it is not her priority. "Cartão Postal" is a blues rock ballad addressing a classic theme of romantic songs: farewell or the end of a relationship. With a tone of advice, the track resembles the guidance of a youthful mother or older sister, encouraging a lighter approach to life without suffering.

The title track, "Fruto Proibido", subverts the image of the "deceitful and treacherous woman" depicted in popular imagination and epitomized by Eve, the first woman according to the Bible. With a performance that is both ironic and candid, somewhat naive yet mischievous, she delivers the lines: "To eat the forbidden fruit / don't you find it irresistible? / In this fruit lies hidden / paradise / I know the fruit is forbidden / but I fall into temptation." Meanwhile, "Esse Tal de Roque Enrow" features sarcastic lyrics. The song simulates a phone call from a mother worried about her rock-loving daughter, calling a psychiatrist to "cure" her, saying: "She doesn't even come home anymore, doctor, she hates my dresses / My daughter is a serious case, doctor / She's now living with this guy named Roque Enrow." Implicitly, the song critiques the moralizing norms surrounding women in a conservative Brazil. The young woman in the story defies societal expectations, such as marriage, stability, and conformity, instead embracing a life outside the norm.

The sixth track, "O Toque", explores the magical connection between humans and the universe. It also touches on the empowerment of the protagonist, though the message is not explicitly feminist. In "Pirataria", Lee continues her theme of autonomy and emancipation, but without resorting to clichés. The opening lines convey irreverence and rebellion not as slogans, as in protest songs of the past, but through disruptive and raw rock, driven by powerful drums and guitar: "Who said it can't be? / I don't know why / I can do anything! / They told me not to say / I don't know what / but I'm not mute." Lee's delivery is playful, adding another layer of meaning to the song's poetry. The album continues with "Luz del Fuego", which takes its title from the stage name of Dora Vivacqua, an actress and naturist popular in Brazil in the 1940s considered by many scholars to be one of the country's first feminists. The lyrics subtly address how women are viewed in society when they defy social norms and expectations. The lyrical I states: "Today I represent a fruit / maybe even an apple / no, it's not a sin / just an invitation / come see me tomorrow / really!" Here, the songwriter attempts to distance the symbolism of the apple (and sexuality) from sin and taboo, or perhaps to differentiate nudity from sin. Fruto Proibido concludes with "Ovelha Negra", a track that tells the story of someone expelled from their home for being the "black sheep" of the family—someone who does not conform to societal standards and embarrasses their parents. The protagonist appears to be a bourgeois girl who "led a quiet life and enjoyed comfort" until confronted by her father. In response, she declares she is lost, searching for herself, and that it's no use for her father to call her back.

== Release and promotion ==
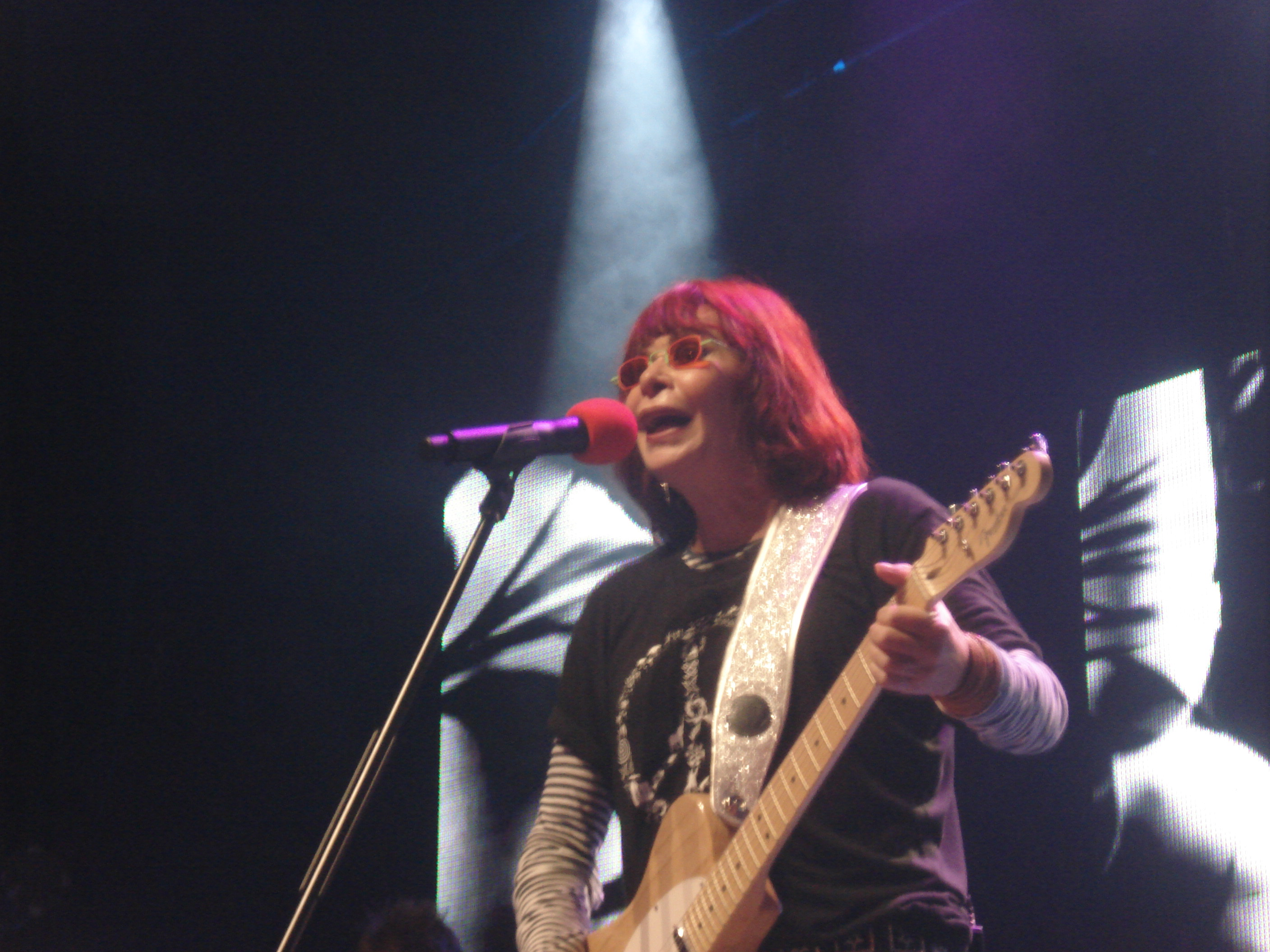
Lee performing the album track "Ovelha Negra" during the recording of Multishow ao Vivo (2009)

Fruto Proibido was released in Brazil on 30 June 1975 on vinyl record. Over the years, it was reissued on cassette, compact disc, and vinyl again, this time by Universal Music. The album was also made internationally available in physical formats in Argentina, France and Switzerland. The album cover features Lee wearing a silk nightgown and stockings with a slit on the left leg, revealing a glimpse of her thigh, seated next to her keyboard in front of her grandmother's vanity, inherited from her mother, in a boudoir setting. The album's design incorporates pink tones, symbolizing femininity, which was often marginalized and rarely associated with rock at the time. Its title references the original sin described in the Bible, Eve's disobedience in eating the forbidden fruit in the Garden of Eden. Gabriela Marqueti of Omelete observed that it reflects a mindset that "women are naturally deceitful, untrustworthy, and treacherous since the dawn of humanity. For others, it's a statement that women were created to be free and question the roles imposed on them by dubious logic." However, the album faced censorship from the Brazilian military dictatorship, which deemed the cover "clearly evocative of a French cabaret atmosphere". Lee's label attempted to argue that the compositions had been approved in 1973, but the album was recalled, and its cover was later modified.

To promote Fruto Proibido, a music video for "Agora Só Falta Você" premiered in August 1975 on the program Fantástico. Later that year, she performed the same song on Globo de Ouro. Following the album's success, two tracks, "Esse Tal de Roque Enrow" and "Agora Só Falta Você", were added to the soundtrack of the Rede Globo telenovela Bravo!. Lee also promoted the album through a tour of the same name, which began on 16 July at the Teatro João Caetano in Rio de Janeiro and visited several other Brazilian cities, including Porto Alegre, Salvador, Belo Horizonte, São Paulo, Curitiba, and Goiânia. The tour featured elaborate stage designs and costumes; Lee wore hats, long gloves, collars, and boots, while the set simulated a long road lined with fruit trees, reflecting the album's theme. Lee commented on the tour: "Our goal is for each performance to be a celebration, joyful and relaxed, so people can take whatever they want from the show. That's why it's important for the sound to be strong and vibrant, especially now that, free from keyboards, I can dance the whole time if I feel like it." The tour was a commercial success, drawing large crowds. At the now-defunct Teatro Aquarius in Brasília, Lee performed for over 11,000 people. However, during the show, the crowd stood up and danced on the chairs, causing damage and a loss of seven thousand cruzeiros for the venue. The tour's setlist included songs from her previous albums and Fruto Proibido, as well as cover versions of "Back in Bahia" (1972) by Gilberto Gil and "Lady Madonna" (1970) by the Beatles. Critics praised the tour for Lee's stage presence, sound quality, and costumes.

== Critical reception ==
Professional ratings
Review scores
Source	Rating
AllMusic	4.5/5 stars
Folha de S. Paulo	Positive
Rolling Stone Brasil	5/5 stars

The majority of critical reviews for Fruto Proibido were positive. Many music critics praised its vocals, instrumentation, lyrics, and the more spontaneous tone compared to Lee's previous works. AllMusic editor Álvaro Neder awarded the album four and a half stars, describing it as a testament to Lee's ability to "be a singer as competent in wild [hard] rock as in softer ballads when she acquires a girlish, tender quality". He also called it "a document of a time when she could be truthful about her ideals". Flávio Marinho, in a positive review for Manchete, noted that Lee sounded more relaxed and joyful than on her previous album: "It is, above all, an irresistibly danceable record [...] Rita presents herself as a much freer performer—now liberated from Lucinha Turnbull's vocal discomfort and keyboard concerns. Fruto Proibido is for relaxing and enjoying." Nelson Motta, writing in his column for O Globo, highlighted it as one of the best releases of 1975, calling it an "exemplary" rock album that for the first time captured Lee's true personality. Motta, echoing Marinho's sentiments, praised its "light, danceable, joyful, and positive" vibe, which he felt was lacking in her earlier projects and other rock artists of the time.

In a retrospective review for Rolling Stone Brasil, Paulo Cavalcanti gave the album five stars, highlighting "Ovelha Negra" as a sign that "Rita was already showing she would never be conventional". A critic from Folha de S.Paulo considered Fruto Proibido "more mature", "more rock and roll", and with "more serious songs" than its predecessor. The reviewer also praised the "quality of the musicians" in Tutti Frutti, who were "much better than last year", as well as Lee, who "in her sexy-sexy role, exceeds expectations, making the album highly recommendable". Similarly, Tárik de Souza of Veja noted that the album's lyrics lacked the "childish naivety" of Atrás do Porto Tem uma Cidade and instead sounded "more decisive, with some self-criticism". He concluded by saying Lee seemed ready to transition from "superstar of the timid national rock scene to first lady of youth music in general". Alberto Carlos de Carvalho of Jornal do Brasil commented that the album features "well-placed vocals", "well-crafted arrangements", and "solid, well-balanced instrumentation". He added that while it did not seem to aim for innovation, it was still "quite charming". Maurício Kubrusly in Jornal da Tarde in 1975 said that only "Dançar pra Não Dançar" and "Ovelha Negra" deserved praise. He also stated that "it is still too little; it would be too much of a concession to settle for this scandalous drumming, the noisy disorder of most of the accompaniments, the lack of expressiveness in the vocals. [...] A production well-suited for fans of the boutique hippie style, a bit kooky and believing that rock will or can change anything."

=== Accolades ===
Based on 1,264 votes, readers of Revista Pop chose Fruto Proibido as the best Brazilian album of 1975. Lee received 2,966 votes and was named the singer of the year. In another year-end poll, this time by Jornal da Música, the album ranked second among releases of the same period. In 2007, Rolling Stone Brasil ranked it 16th on its list of the 100 greatest Brazilian albums of all time, describing it as "the first Brazilian rock album that didn't sound like a copy of its English counterparts". The U.S. edition of the same publication ranked it 41st among the 100 greatest Latin American rock albums of all time—the highest position for a Brazilian female artist—with an editor commenting that "from the cheeky 'Esse Tal de Roque Enrow' to the anthemic 'Ovelha Negra', this self-professed black sheep found redemption in music to the very end".

== Commercial performance ==
By August 1975, just over a month after its release, Fruto Proibido had already sold 20,000 copies in Brazil, an uncommon achievement for a Brazilian rock album at the time. Nelson Motta predicted it could reach 50,000 by the end of the year. Upon reaching this milestone, Motta described the achievement as "historic", marking the "first major popular success of a representative artist of 1970s Brazilian rock" and noting that few national artists had reached similar sales figures. On 28 August, the album debuted at number seven on the Brazilian Institute of Public Opinion and Statistics (IBOPE) best-selling albums chart, published by the American magazine Billboard, which was its peak position. On the chart published by the Nelson Oliveira Pesquisa e Estudo de Mercado (NOPEM) institute, Fruto Proibido made Lee the second best-selling female artist in Brazil in 1975, surpassed only by Beth Carvalho, while the album ranked 12th among the most purchased albums of the period. By January 1976, 80,000 copies had been sold, a number that doubled to 200,000 by the end of that year. As of December 2015, it is estimated that over 700,000 copies of the album have been sold.

== Impact and legacy ==
"We have to talk about Rita Lee because she truly embodies the meaning of the word legacy. If in 10 years people still remember Rita Lee as the queen of rock or with other titles [...] and especially if they remember her importance and how her discography includes some iconic albums, then her legacy will truly be cemented. This includes the undeniable genius she displayed in albums like Fruto Proibido and Entradas e Bandeiras (1976). [...] To me, these are true masterpieces, not just of Lee's career, but of Brazilian rock history, or rather, of Brazilian music as a whole."

— Regis Tadeu on Lee's legacy and the impact of Fruto Proibido on Brazilian music.

The impact of Fruto Proibido and its legacy in Brazilian music are frequently highlighted by critics, journalists and musicians. The album's release led to Lee being referred to as the "Queen of Brazilian Rock", gaining recognition in Brazil and abroad. (Note: Attributed to multiple references:) She often rejected the title of "Queen of Brazilian Rock", considering it "old-fashioned" and "tacky", and preferred to be called the "Patron Saint of Freedom". According to Rafael Steph's article A Ironia Na Festa de Rita Lee, the album not only "became one of the greatest milestones in the Brazilian music industry" but also "paved the way for the rock movement in the decades that followed". Lia Machado Alvim, a journalist for TV Cultura, noted that this was the album that finally "propelled Rita and her band to success". At the time of its release, music columnist Nelson Motta of O Globo stated that the album not only marked Lee's first major commercial success but also the "first major popular success of a representative artist of 1970s Brazilian rock". Music journalist Pedro Hollanda noted that the album "marked a massive comeback for Rita after years of being sidelined by Os Mutantes and enduring interference from record executives trying to mold her into a more traditional female artist". Professor and researcher Eduardo Vicente observed that the album "helped break the barrier of the traditional MPB audience by bringing a poetic and musical discourse very different from the 'traditional romantic' style to a young audience that was certainly distinct from those who attended the song festivals of the previous decade".

In retrospective, many musicians and scholars consider the album a key influence on the Brazilian rock movement of the 1980s, which later gained widespread popularity. Vicente describes it as "the defining moment for Brazilian rock", noting that at the time, the genre had few notable artists. Lee and Tutti Frutti, Raul Seixas, and occasionally Erasmo Carlos were the main figures sustaining it before the major rock wave of the 1980s. Gabriela Marqueti of Omelete argued that with this album, Lee "proved that rock could be feminine and pink. Nothing in this album talks about using drugs or sleeping with groupies, but rather about finding personal identity and claiming one's own space. It subverts the entire idea of rock and roll tied to a macho and exhibitionist posture". Journalist Marco Antonio Cunha of Boomerang Music added that the album served as a response to sexists who tried to diminish her with rhetoric like "you need balls to play rock". Feminist writer Valeria de Oliveira Gomes cited "Fruto Proibido" and "Ovelha Negra" as examples of Lee's songs that addressed "themes like independence and freedom" during Brazil's military dictatorship. In 2023, editor Helena Tomaz observed that "despite being nearly 50 years old, the lyrics of Fruto Proibido have remained relevant over the decades. The honesty and freedom conveyed by Rita Lee never age". The author highlighted "Ovelha Negra" for "becoming a kind of anthem for Lee's fans. The song resonates and includes those who feel excluded". Thiago Nolla of CinePOP added that the song "champions identity liberation, saying it's okay not to belong somewhere—sooner or later, you'll find yourself".

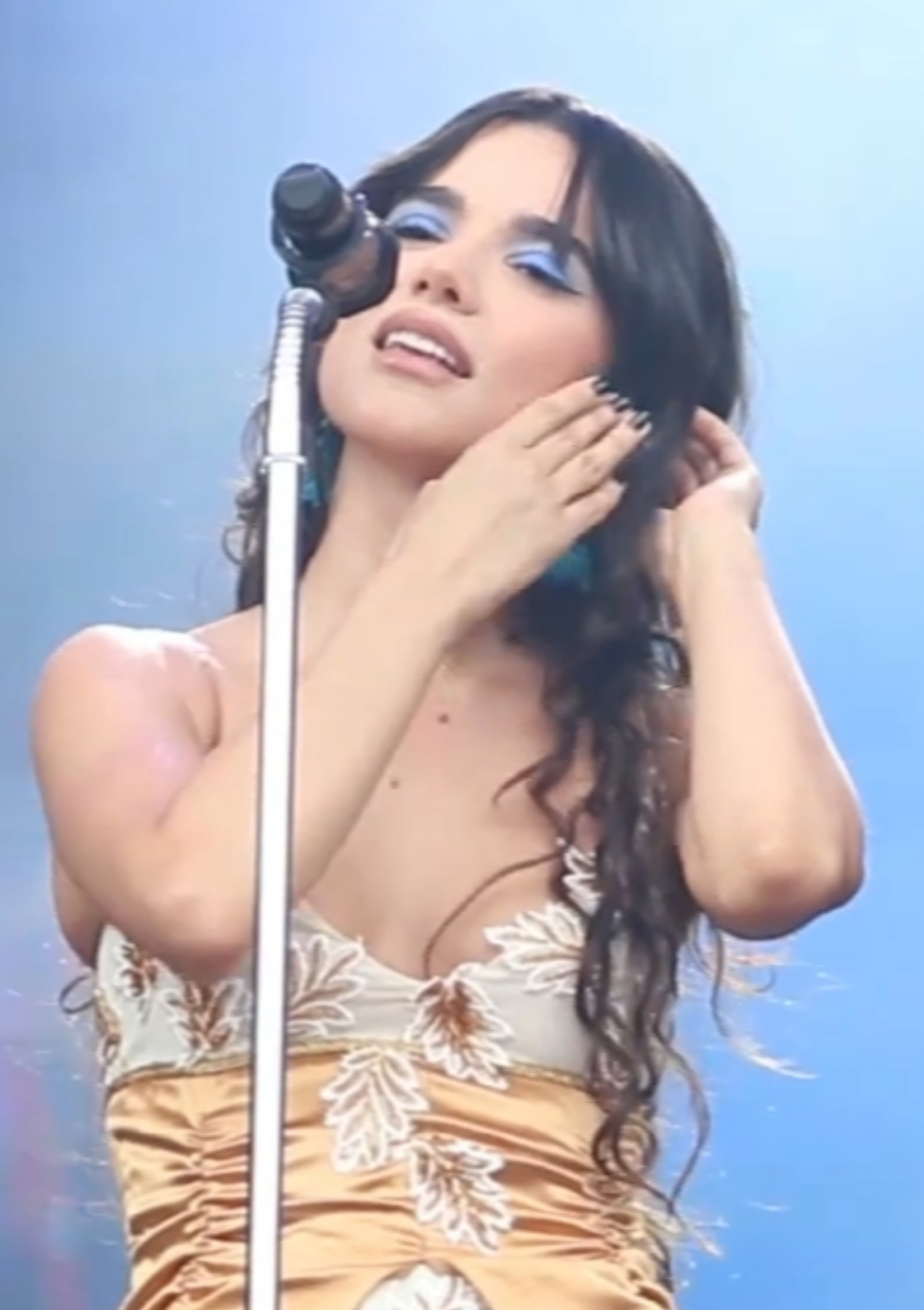
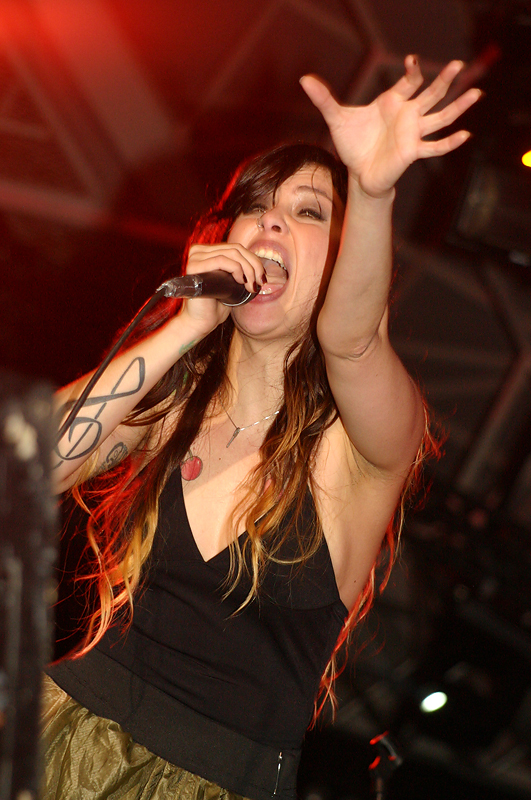
Singers Manu Gavassi (left) and Pitty (right) are among the many artists who have cited Fruto Proibido as an influence on their musical development, and both have covered songs from the album.

Fruto Proibido and its songs are considered a reference and one of the favorite albums for many Brazilian artists. Paulo Ricardo, Pitty, Manu Gavassi, Paula Lima, and Zélia Duncan are among those who have cited it as an inspiration for their careers. For Gavassi, the album is "an emancipation and a cry for freedom" from Lee, stating: "At a time when most female singers were interpreters of lyrics written by men, she was always the author of her own story and a composer when that wasn't common". When invited to the Acústico MTV series in 2022, her admiration manifested into a cover of the album under the title Manu Gavassi canta Fruto Proibido. She toured the country that year to promote the covers. Musician Roberto Frejat described the album as "different from anything else being recorded in Brazilian rock at the time". For him, Lee's work was ubiquitous: "Almost every band I played in, even before Barão Vermelho, had 'Agora Só Falta Você' in their repertoire. This album will always remain in memory as something marvelous". In an interview with Universo Online, Pitty spoke about Lee's influence on her music and cited Fruto Proibido as her favorite album by Lee: "in terms of lyrics, arrangements, tones, the band, and her vocal style at the time". She covered "Agora Só Falta Você" for the opening of the 22nd season of Malhação (2014) and performed "Esse Tal de Roque Enrow" alongside Lee for the live recording MTV ao Vivo: Rita Lee (2004). In May 2023, the Anatomia do Disco project, organized by the Porto Iracema das Artes School under the Secretariat of Culture of the State of Ceará, held a conference bringing together academics and journalists to discuss the album's contribution and legacy to Brazilian music.

== Track listing ==
All tracks are written by Rita Lee and produced by Andy Mills, except where noted.

No.	Title	Writer(s)	Length
1.	"Dançar pra Não Dançar"		4:13
2.	"Agora Só Falta Você"	Luis Sérgio Carlini; Rita Lee	3:25
3.	"Cartão Postal"	Paulo Coelho; Lee	3:25
4.	"Fruto Proibido"		2:04
5.	"Esse Tal de Roque Enrow"	Coelho; Lee	3:53
6.	"O Toque"	Coelho; Lee	5:20
7.	"Pirataria"	Lee Marcucci; Lee	4:29
8.	"Luz del Fuego"		4:42
9.	"Ovelha Negra"		5:39
Total length:			37:10

== Personnel ==
The entire process of creating Fruto Proibido is attributed to the following credits:

- Rita Lee – vocals, acoustic guitar, and synthesizer
- Luis Sérgio Carlini – guitars, slide guitar, acoustic guitar, harmonica, and backing vocals
- Lee Marcucci – bass guitar and cowbell
- Franklin Paolillo – drums and percussion
- Guilherme Bueno – piano and clavinet
- Rubens Nardo – backing vocals
- Gilberto Nardo – backing vocals
- Manito – saxophone, flute, Hammond organ
- Meca – photography
- Geysa Adnet – graphic artist
- Andy Mills – music production
- Otávio Augusto – production assistance
- Flávio Augusto – recording
- Luis Carlos Baptista – recording, mixing
- Mónica Lisboa – management
- Carlos Savalla – remastering
- Luigi Hoffer – remastering
- Gaivota – technical assistance

== Charts ==
Weekly charts for Fruto Proibido
Country – Chart (1975)	Peak position
Brazil (IBOPE)	7

End-of-year charts for Fruto Proibido
Country – Chart (1975)	Position
Brazil (NOPEM)	12

== Bibliography ==
- Araújo, Christiana Oliveira Albuquerque de (2021). Fruto Proibido: Os recados da superestrela Rita Lee (PDF) (Thesis). Pontifícia Universidade Católica do Rio de Janeiro.
- Duncan, Zélia (2022). Benditas coisas que eu não sei: Músicas, memórias, nostalgias felizes. Agir. ISBN 978-6558371229.
- Gomes, Valéria de Oliveira (2022). Rita Lee : o querer feminino no rock and roll brasileiro (Thesis). Ouro Preto: Universidade Federal de Ouro Preto.
- Lee, Rita (2016). Rita Lee: uma autobiografia. Globo. ISBN 978-8525063304.
- Saggiorato, Alexandre; Brambilla, Edemilson Antônio (2017). "Rock em tempos de repressão e censura: a ditadura militar e os álbuns da banda Tutti Frutti" (PDF). Revista Contemporâneos.
- Steph, Rafael (2020). "A Ironia Na Festa de Rita Lee" (PDF). Revista Contemporâneos.
