= De Volta ao Planeta dos Mutantes =

De Volta Ao Planeta Dos Mutantes

Compilation album by Os Mutantes
- Released: 2006
- Genre: Tropicalia, psychedelic rock, progressive rock
- Label: Universal

Professional ratings
Review scores
Source	Rating
Allmusic	3/5 stars

De Volta Ao Planeta Dos Mutantes is a two disc best of compilation that includes popular and lesser known tracks from Os Mutantes first five albums, O A e o Z, Tecnicolor, and A Banda Tropicalista do Duprat by Rogério Duprat which includes a cover of The Beatles' "Lady Madonna". The album also includes a few previously unreleased tracks.

== Track listing ==
Disc 1
No.	Title	Original release	Length
1.	"Panis et Circenses"	Os Mutantes
2.	"She's My Shoo Shoo (A Minha Menina)"	Tecnicolor
3.	"Não Vá se Perder por Aí"	Os Mutantes
4.	"Banho de Lua"	Mutantes
5.	"Rua Augusta"	Mutantes e Seus Cometas no País do Baurets
6.	"Hey Boy"	A Divina Comédia ou Ando Meio Desligado
7.	"Rolling Stone"	O A e o Z
8.	"Lady Madonna" (with Rogério Duprat)	A Banda Tropicalista Do Duprat
9.	"Preciso Urgentemente Encontrar um Amigo"	A Divina Comédia ou Ando Meio Desligado
10.	"Jogo de Calçada"	A Divina Comédia ou Ando Meio Desligado
11.	"Le Premier Bonheur du Jour"	Os Mutantes
12.	"Chão de Estrelas"	A Divina Comédia ou Ando Meio Desligado
13.	"Baby"	Os Mutantes

Disc 2
No.	Title	Original release	Length
1.	""A" e o "Z""	O A e o Z
2.	"Glória ao Rei dos Confins do Além"	II Festival Estudantil da Música Popular Brasileira
3.	"Mutantes e Seus Cometas no País dos Baurets"	Mutantes e Seus Cometas no País dos Baurets
4.	"Todo Mundo Pastou II"	Mutantes e Seus Cometas no País dos Baurets
5.	"Cinderella Rockefella" (with Rogério Duprat)	A Banda Tropicalista Do Duprat
6.	"Oh! Mulher Infiel"	A Divina Comédia ou Ando Meio Desligado
7.	"Canção para Inglês Ver/Chiquita Bacana" (with Rogério Duprat)	A Banda Tropicalista Do Duprat
8.	"The Rain, the Park and Other Things" (with Rogério Duprat)	A Banda Tropicalista Do Duprat
9.	"Uma Pessoa Só"	O A e o Z
10.	"Haleluia"	A Divina Comédia ou Ando Meio Desligado
11.	"Hey Joe"	O A e o Z
12.	"Você Sabe"	O A e o Z
13.	"Ainda Vou Transar com Você"	O A e o Z
14.	"Panis et Circenses (Alternate version)"	Tecnicolor
