= Loki? =

Studio album by Arnaldo Baptista
- Released: 1974
- Recorded: 1974 in Estúdio Eldorado
- Genres: Rock, jazz fusion, art rock, rock and roll, bossa nova
- Length: 33:40
- Label: Philips/PolyGram
- Producers: Roberto Menescal, Marco Mazzola

Arnaldo Baptista chronology
Loki? (1974)	Singin' Alone (1982)

Professional ratings
Review scores
Source	Rating
AllMusic	4/5 stars

Loki? is the first solo album from Arnaldo Baptista, the keyboardist, bassist and singer of the Brazilian band Os Mutantes. It was released in 1974 after a supposed nervous breakdown and it is considered one of the best albums in the 1970s Brazilian music scene. The album expresses his angst towards the height of post-modern society, along with the suffocating aspect of modernity: pollution, superpopulation, loneliness, etc.

In 2007, it was ranked 34th by Rolling Stone Brazil on the list of the 100 Greatest Brazilian Albums of All Time.

The album cover, signed by Aldo Luiz, features two overlapping pictures of Baptista against a star-spangled background. He is shirtless and holding a pellet gun and a bullet belt. The image was taken by the porch of his house in the Serra da Cantareira region. The back cover has a picture of an angel statue he bought in a cemetery.

== Track listing ==
All tracks are written by Arnaldo Baptista except where noted.

Side one
No.	Title	Writer(s)	Length
1.	"Será que Eu Vou Virar Bolor?"		3:52
2.	"Uma Pessoa Só"	Mutantes (Arnaldo Baptista, Sérgio Dias, Liminha, Dinho Leme)	4:01
3.	"Não Estou Nem Aí"		3:23
4.	"Vou Me Afundar na Lingerie"		3:26
5.	"Honky Tonky (Patrulha do Espaço)"		2:14

Side two
No.	Title	Length
6.	"Cê Tá Pensando que Eu Sou Loki?"	3:25
7.	"Desculpe"	3:12
8.	"Navegar de Novo"	5:33
9.	"Te Amo Podes Crer"	2:54
10.	"É Fácil"	1:57

== Personnel ==
- Arnaldo Baptista – piano, vocals, organ, clavinet, Moog synthesizer, twelve-string guitar
- Liminha – bass guitar
- Dinho Leme – drums
- Rogério Duprat – orchestral arrangements in "Uma Pessoa Só" and "Cê Tá Pensando que Eu Sou Loki?"
- Sergio Kaffa – bass guitar in "Desculpe"
- Rita Lee – backing vocal in "Não Estou Nem Aí" and "Vou Me Afundar na Lingerie"
