= Hoje É o Primeiro Dia do Resto da Sua Vida =

Studio album by Rita Lee
- Released: September 1972
- Recorded: June 1972 in Estúdio Eldorado, São Paulo
- Genre: Psychedelic rock, experimental, progressive rock, comedy rock
- Length: 35:17
- Language: Portuguese
- Label: Polydor
- Producer: Arnaldo Baptista

Rita Lee chronology
Build Up (1970)	Hoje É o Primeiro Dia do Resto da Sua Vida (1972)	Atrás do Porto Tem uma Cidade (1974)

Professional ratings
Review scores
Source	Rating
Allmusic	4/5 stars

Hoje É o Primeiro Dia do Resto da Sua Vida (Portuguese for "Today is the first day of the rest of your life") is the second solo record by Brazilian singer Rita Lee. Originally intended to be released as an album by Os Mutantes, due to conflicts with the band's record label it was released as a Rita Lee solo effort. The album marks the last time Lee would work with the Baptista brothers before her exit from Mutantes. In a matter of fact, the album was a product of a proper Os Mutantes creative process. The record company Polydor, declined to publish two Mutantes albums within one year (the former was Mutantes e Seus Cometas no País do Baurets). The band decided to exclusively give Ms. Lee the vocal role, and publish the album under her name.

Due to its scarcity, original pressings of the album have been known to sell for upwards of $1,000.

== Track listing ==
Side one
No.	Title	Writer(s)	Length
1.	"Vamos Tratar da Saúde"	Arnaldo Baptista, Rita Lee, Liminha	3:05
2.	"Beija-Me Amor"	Arnaldo Baptista, Élcio Decário	3:56
3.	"Hoje É o Primeiro Dia do Resto da Sua Vida"	Arnaldo Baptista, Sérgio Dias	4:12
4.	"Teimosia"	Arnaldo Baptista, Rita Lee, Liminha	2:03
5.	"Frique Comigo"	Arnaldo Baptista, Rita Lee, Sérgio Dias, Dinho Leme	3:24

Side two
No.	Title	Writer(s)	Length
6.	"Amor Preto e Branco"	Arnaldo Baptista, Rita Lee	2:11
7.	"Tiroleite"	Arnaldo Baptista, Rita Lee, Sérgio Dias, Liminha	3:49
8.	"Tapupukitipa"	Arnaldo Baptista, Rita Lee	5:10
9.	"De Novo Aqui Meu Bom José"	Arnaldo Baptista, Rita Lee, Sérgio Dias, Liminha	3:13
10.	"Superfície do Planeta"	Arnaldo Baptista	4:17

== Personnel ==
Os Mutantes

- Arnaldo Baptista: Vox organ, Minimoog, piano, Hohner clavinet, vocals
- Rita Lee: lead vocals
- Sérgio Dias: guitars, vocals
- Liminha: bass guitar, backing vocals
- Dinho Leme: drums

Special guests:

- Lúcia Turnbull - vocals
- Cláudio Cesar Dias Baptista - voice in "Hoje É o Primeiro Dia do Resto da Sua Vida" and "Superfície do Planeta"
