= Haih or Amortecedor =

Studio album by Os Mutantes
- Released: September 8, 2009
- Recorded: 2009
- Genre: Experimental rock, psychedelic rock, progressive rock
- Label: Anti-
- Producer: Sérgio Dias

Os Mutantes chronology
Tecnicolor (2000)	Haih or Amortecedor (2009)	Fool Metal Jack (2013)

Haih or Amortecedor is the ninth studio album by the Brazilian rock band Os Mutantes, their first studio album since Tudo Foi Feito Pelo Sol in 1974 and the first one of new material since Mutantes Ao Vivo in 1976.

Following the band's 2006 reunion at London's Barbican Theatre, Mutantes founder Sergio Dias commenced work on Mutantes' first studio album in 35 years. Dias collaborated with Tom Zé and Jorge Ben (who wrote the band's original hit "A Minha Menina").

Living the conception and birth of this album, as an individual, was the most intense experience, for it was as if time has ceased to exist, and I was bouncing from life to life, decades through decades, revisiting myself as a 16 year old boy playing guitar and feeling so free and, as any teenager, indestructible.

— Sergio Dias, May 2009

The word "haih" means "crow" in the Shoshone language. "Amortecedor" means "shock absorber" in Portuguese.

== Critical reception ==
Professional ratings
Review scores
Source	Rating
The A.V. Club	(B)
AllMusic	4/5 stars
Billboard	(favourable)
CHARTattack	3.5/5 stars
Pitchfork	(7.0/10)
Rolling Stone	3/5 stars
Slant	3.5/5 stars
Spin	4/5 stars

A reviewer identified as Mojo, writing for Lead World Music Review, summarized, "Gloriously nonsensical and beautifully out there, this is a joyful triumph, 4 out of 5".

== Track listing ==
World version

1. Hymns of the World P.1 (Intro) (note: this is a recording of Vladimir Putin addressing the Russian Army
2. Querida Querida
3. Teclar
4. 2000 e Agarrum
5. Baghdad Blues
6. O Careca
7. O Mensageiro
8. Anagrama
9. Samba Do Fidel
10. Neurociência do Amor
11. Nada Mudou
12. Gopala Krishna Om
13. Hymns Of The World P.2 (Final)
14. Amortecedor (iTunes bonus track)
15. Call Me (iTunes bonus track)

Brazilian version

1. Hymns of the World P.1
2. Amortecedor
3. Querida Querida
4. Teclar
5. 2000 E Agarrum
6. Bagdad Blues
7. Zheng He
8. Singing The Blues
9. O Mensageiro
10. O Careca
11. Anagrama
12. Samba Do Fidel
13. Neurociencia Do Amor
14. Call Me
15. Hymns Of The World P.2

"Nada Mudou" and "Gopala Krishna Om" appear only on the world version. "Zheng He" and "Singing The Blues" appear only on the Brazilian version, along with two songs that are bonus tracks on the standard edition: "Amortecedor" and "Call Me". The two versions of the album comprise a total of 17 different songs.

== Personnel ==
- Sérgio Dias – guitar, vocals
- Dinho Leme – drums
- Henrique Peters – keyboard
- Vitor Trida – keyboard, guitar, flute, viola caipira, violin
- Vinicius Junqueira – bass guitar
- Simone Soul – percussion
- Fábio Recco – vocals
- Bia Mendes – vocals
