= Sanguinho Novo... Arnaldo Baptista Revisitado =

Compilation album by various artists
- Released: 1989
- Genre: Post-punk, garage rock, thrash metal, punk rock, grindcore, alternative rock, hard rock
- Label: Eldorado
- Producer: Alex Antunes, Carlos Eduardo Miranda

Sanguinho Novo... Arnaldo Baptista Revisitado (Portuguese for New Little Blood... Arnaldo Baptista Revisited) is a tribute album by various artists and bands to Brazilian musician Arnaldo Baptista, famous for his work with influential psychedelic rock band Os Mutantes. It was released in 1989 by Eldorado.

The album's cover was provided by Alain Voss, who previously worked with Os Mutantes designing the cover of their 1972 album Mutantes e Seus Cometas no País do Baurets.

== Track listing ==
No.	Title	Artist	Length
1.	"O Sol"	Sexo Explícito	4:04
2.	"Dia 36"	3 Hombres	3:16
3.	"Bomba H Sobre São Paulo"	Vzyadoq Moe	2:58
4.	"A Hora e a Vez do Cabelo Nascer"	Sepultura	2:17
5.	"I Fell in Love One Day"	O Último Número	3:41
6.	"Superfície do Planeta"	Paulo Miklos	2:06
7.	"Sanguinho Novo"	Akira S. e as Garotas que Erraram	2:19
8.	"Jardim Elétrico"	Ratos de Porão	1:21
9.	"Cê Tá Pensando que Eu Sou Lóki?"	Fellini	3:16
10.	"Sitting on the Roadside"	Atahualpa y us Panquis	3:48
11.	"É Fácil"	Skowa	2:53
12.	"Te Amo, Podes Crer"	Maria Angélica Não Mora Mais Aqui	5:07

=== Outtakes ===
Due to time constraints, a cover of "Cyborg" by Black Future was not included in the vinyl version, but appeared as a bonus track in the cassette edition.
