= Tecnicolor =

Studio album by Os Mutantes
- Released: 2000
- Recorded: November 1970
- Genre: Tropicália, psychedelic rock, experimental
- Length: 38:55
- Label: Universal
- Producer: Carl Holmes

Os Mutantes chronology
O A e o Z (1992)	Tecnicolor (2000)	Mutantes Ao Vivo – Barbican Theatre, Londres 2006 (2006)

Professional ratings
Review scores
Source	Rating
Allmusic	link

Tecnicolor would have been the fourth album by the Brazilian band Os Mutantes. The album was intended to be their introduction in the English-speaking world and included English versions of songs from the albums Os Mutantes and A Divina Comédia ou Ando Meio Desligado, re-recordings in Portuguese and French, and several new songs. It was recorded in Paris, in 1970, but released only 30 years later.

Speculations have been raised that the tapes were lost until writer Carlos Calado, working on the band's biography, uncovered them. An alternative explanation is that the band was unsatisfied with many of the recordings, and abandoned the project to return to Brazil. Three of the recordings from these sessions were used later that year in their album Jardim Elétrico.

The album was released in 2000 by Universal Records, with artwork by Sean Lennon, in order to capitalize on the growing interest in Os Mutantes following the re-release of their early albums in the late 1990s.

== Track listing ==
All tracks are written by Arnaldo Baptista, Rita Lee, Sérgio Dias, except where noted.

No.	Title	Writer(s)	Length
1.	"Panis et Circenses" (Re-recorded from Os Mutantes)	Caetano Veloso, Gilberto Gil; English lyrics by Os Mutantes	2:12
2.	"Bat Macumba" (Re-recorded from Os Mutantes)	Caetano Veloso, Gilberto Gil	3:16
3.	"Virginia" (Re-recorded for Jardim Elétrico)		3:23
4.	"She's My Shoo Shoo (A Minha Menina)" (Re-recorded from Os Mutantes)	Jorge Ben; English lyrics by Os Mutantes	2:52
5.	"I Feel A Little Spaced Out (Ando Meio Desligado)" (Re-recorded from A Divina Comédia ou Ando Meio Desligado)		2:51
6.	"Baby" (Re-recorded from Os Mutantes; Recording used for Jardim Elétrico)	Caetano Veloso; English lyrics by Os Mutantes	3:36
7.	"Tecnicolor" (Recording used for Jardim Elétrico)		3:54
8.	"El Justiciero" (Recording used for Jardim Elétrico)		3:52
9.	"I'm Sorry Baby (Desculpe, Babe)" (Re-recorded from A Divina Comédia ou Ando Meio Desligado)	Arnaldo Baptista, Rita Lee	2:42
10.	"Adeus, Maria Fulô" (Re-recorded from Os Mutantes)	Sivuca, Humberto Teixeira	2:39
11.	"Le Premier Bonheur du Jour" (Re-recorded from Os Mutantes)	Jean Renard, Frank Gerald	2:46
12.	"Saravah" (Re-recorded for Jardim Elétrico)		2:59
13.	"Panis et Circenses (Reprise)"	Caetano Veloso, Gilberto Gil; English lyrics by Os Mutantes	1:23

== Personnel ==
Os Mutantes

- Arnaldo Baptista: vocals (tracks 1, 2, 4, 8, 9, 10, 12, 13), keyboards
- Rita Lee: vocals (tracks 1, 2, 4, 5, 6, 7, 8, 10, 11, 12, 13), percussion
- Sérgio Dias: vocals (tracks 1, 2, 3, 4, 5, 7, 8, 10, 12, 13), guitars
- Liminha: bass, backing vocal
- Dinho Leme: drums, percussion
