= Fool Metal Jack =

Studio album by Os Mutantes
- Released: April 30, 2013
- Genre: Experimental rock, art rock, psychedelic rock, world music
- Length: 45:21
- Label: Krian Music Group

Os Mutantes chronology
Haih Or Amortecedor (2009)	Fool Metal Jack (2013)	Zzyzx (2020)

Professional ratings
Review scores
Source	Rating
Allmusic	4/5 stars
NME	3.5/5 stars
Consequence of Sound	3/5 stars
The Boston Globe	(mixed)
Rolling Stone	(favourable)

Fool Metal Jack is the tenth studio album by the Brazilian rock band Os Mutantes. Released on April 30, 2013 by the US-based label Krian Music Group, it is the follow-up to Haih Or Amortecedor, Os Mutantes' first studio album in 35 years.

== Track listing ==
All tracks are written by Sérgio Dias except where noted.

No.	Title	Writer(s)	Length
1.	"The Dream Is Gone"		2:50
2.	"Fool Metal Jack"	Sérgio Dias, Vinícius Junqueira	5:23
3.	"Picadilly Willy"		4:42
4.	"Ganja Man"		3:33
5.	"Look Out"	Vitor Trida	3:48
6.	"Eu Descobri"	Gilberto Gil	3:05
7.	"Time and Space"	Sérgio Dias, Sam Spiegel	3:57
8.	"To Make It Beautiful"		3:26
9.	"Once Upon a Flight"	Vitor Trida	4:00
10.	"Into Limbo"		3:37
11.	"Bangladesh"		4:08
12.	"Valse LSD"		3:11
