= Jardim Elétrico =

Studio album by Os Mutantes
- Released: March 1971
- Recorded: 1970–1971
- Genre: Psychedelic rock, progressive rock, psychedelic pop
- Length: 38:37
- Label: Polydor
- Producer: Arnaldo Baptista

Os Mutantes chronology
A Divina Comédia ou Ando Meio Desligado (1970)	Jardim Elétrico (1971)	Mutantes e Seus Cometas no País do Baurets (1972)

Professional ratings
Review scores
Source	Rating
Allmusic	4/5 stars

Jardim Elétrico (transl. Electric Garden) is the fourth album by the Brazilian Tropicália/psychedelic rock band Os Mutantes. The album was originally released in 1971 (see 1971 in music) on Polydor Records. The title in English means Electric Garden. Five of the songs from this album were originally intended to be released on the album Tecnicolor, but that album was not released until 2000.

The album also saw Arnaldo Baptista take over as the band's producer, a position he would maintain until he left the band in 1973.

It was listed by Rolling Stone Brazil at #72 on the 100 best Brazilian albums in history list.

== Track listing ==
All tracks are written by Arnaldo Baptista, Rita Lee and Sérgio Dias except where noted.

Side one
No.	Title	Writer(s)	Lead vocals	Length
1.	"Top Top"	Arnaldo Baptista, Rita Lee, Sergio Dias, Liminha	Rita Lee	2:29
2.	"Benvinda"	Arnaldo Baptista, Rita Lee	Arnaldo Baptista	2:48
3.	"Tecnicolor"		Lee and Sérgio Dias	3:46
4.	"El Justiciero"		Baptista, Lee and Dias	3:52
5.	"It's Very Nice pra Xuxu"		Baptista and Dias	4:49
6.	"Portugal de Navio"		Baptista, Lee, Dias and Liminha	2:44

Side two
No.	Title	Writer(s)	Lead vocals	Length
7.	"Virgínia"		Dias	3:27
8.	"Jardim Elétrico"		Baptista, Lee and Dias	3:14
9.	"Lady, Lady"	Arnaldo Baptista, Rita Lee, Sérgio Dias, Liminha	Dias	3:33
10.	"Saravá"		Lee and Dias	4:25
11.	"Baby"	Caetano Veloso - Version: Arnaldo Baptista, Rita Lee, Sérgio Dias	Lee	3:38

== Personnel ==
Os Mutantes

- Arnaldo Baptista: vocals (tracks 2, 4, 5, 8), keyboards
- Rita Lee: vocals (tracks 1, 3, 4, 8, 10, 11), percussion
- Sérgio Dias: vocals (tracks 3, 4, 5, 6, 7, 8, 9, 10), guitars
- Liminha: bass, backing vocals, vocal (track 6)
- Dinho Leme: drums

with:

- Rogério Duprat: orchestral arrangements
