= Tudo Foi Feito pelo Sol =

Tudo foi Feito pelo Sol

Studio album by Os Mutantes
- Released: 1974
- Genre: Progressive rock, psychedelic rock, jazz fusion
- Length: 42:47
- Label: Som Livre
- Producer: Os Mutantes

Os Mutantes chronology
Mutantes e Seus Cometas no País do Baurets (1972)	Tudo foi Feito pelo Sol (1974)	O A e o Z (1992)

Tudo foi Feito pelo Sol (transl. Everything Was Made By The Sun) is the sixth album by the Brazilian rock band Os Mutantes. The only original member of the band to take part in the recording of this album was guitarist Sérgio Dias.

== Track listing ==
Side one
No.	Title	Writer(s)	Length
1.	"Deixe Entrar um Pouco d'Água no Quintal"	Sérgio Dias, Rui Motta, Liminha	5:03
2.	"Pitágoras"	Túlio Mourão	6:56
3.	"Desanuviar"	Sérgio Dias, Liminha	8:13

Side two
No.	Title	Writer(s)	Length
4.	"Eu Só Penso em Te Ajudar"	Sérgio Dias, Liminha	4:58
5.	"Cidadão da Terra"	Sérgio Dias, Liminha	5:35
6.	"O Contrário de Nada É Nada"	Sérgio Dias, Túlio Mourão	2:58
7.	"Tudo foi Feito pelo Sol"	Sérgio Dias	8:46

Bonus tracks on CD reissue

Caveleiros Negros EP
No.	Title	Writer(s)	Length
1.	"Cavaleiros Negros"	Sérgio Dias/Rui Motta/Antônio Pedro	8:37
2.	"Tudo Bem"	Sérgio Dias/Antônio Pedro	4:23
3.	"Balada do Amigo"	Túlio Mourão	3:34

- These three tracks comprise an EP issued in 1976.

== Personnel ==
- Sérgio Dias: electric and acoustic guitars, vocals, sitar
- Antônio Pedro: bass guitar, vocals
- Rui Motta: drums, percussion
- Túlio Mourão: Hammond organ, piano, Minimoog, vocals
