= Buildup =

Buildup may refer to:

- Atomic buildup, a concept in atomic physics
- Capital buildup, the gathering of objects of value
- Glacier ice buildup, an element in the glacier mass balance formula
- Build-up, a tactic in association football
- build up (solitaire term), in a patience or card solitaire, to add cards to a pile in ascending sequence

== See also ==
- Build Up
- Built-up area
