= Rádio Táxi =

- Left to right: Gel Fernandes, Maurício Gasperini, Wander Taffo, Lee Marcucci

Background information
- Origin: São Paulo, São Paulo, Brazil
- Genres: Pop rock; jangle pop
- Years active: 1981–1987, 1993–2008
- Label: Sony Music
- Members: Lee Marcucci (bass), Maurício Gasperini (keyboards/guitar/vocals), Wander Taffo (guitar), Gel Fernandes (drums)
- Past members: Willie de Oliveira (keyboards/vocals), Marcinho Eiras (guitar)
- Website: http://www.radiotaxiweb.com.br

Rádio Táxi is a pop rock band from São Paulo, Brazil, who had a string of hit singles in the early/mid 80s. The band was formed in 1981 by guitarist Wander Taffo, drummer Gel Fernandes, bassist Lee Marcucci and singer/keyboardist Willie de Oliveira, all ex-members of Rita Lee's backing band, Tutti Frutti.

Named by Nelson Motta, they released their self-titled debut album in 1982, featuring the hits "Coisas de Casal" (written by Rita Lee with her husband Roberto de Carvalho as a gift to the band), "Dentro do Coração (Põe Devagar)" and "Garota Dourada". The band's popularity skyrocketed with the release of their second album, Rádio Táxi 2, and the first single out of the album, "Eva", a Portuguese version of a song by Italian singer Umberto Tozzi. Willie de Oliveira left the band shortly after recording the second album and was replaced by Maurício Gasperini. With Gasperini now handling vocals and keyboards, they released the albums 6:56 (1985) and Matriz (1986), featuring the hits "Um Amor de Verão" and "Você se Esconde". The band split up in 1987, and all members went back to their successful careers as session musicians. Wander Taffo released three solo albums and opened a music school in São Paulo, following the successful format of the American Musicians Institute.

In 1993, drummer Gel Fernandes and bassist Lee Marcucci revived the band, with Marcinho Eiras on guitars. Despite extensive touring and positive feedback from fans, the new Rádio Táxi soon disbanded without releasing any new material. The reunion of the successful mid-80s lineup happened in 2000, when Brazilian singer and pianist Guilherme Arantes invited Taffo, Marcucci and Fernandes to play with him on a live album. After touring with Arantes, they began working on new Rádio Táxi material with Gasperini and released a live album and DVD, featuring all the old hits alongside the new material.

Guitarist Wander Taffo died in Brazil on May 14, 2008.

== Discography ==
- Rádio Táxi (1982)
- Rádio Táxi 2 (1983)
- 6:56 (1985)
- Matriz (1986)
- Ao Vivo (2006)
