= O Inimitável =

Studio album by Roberto Carlos
- Released: December 1968
- Recorded: 1968
- Studios: CBS Studios, Rio de Janeiro
- Genres: blue-eyed soul; rhythm and blues; funk; Rock and roll; Romantic music
- Length: 39:26
- Label: Columbia
- Producer: Evandro Ribeiro

Roberto Carlos chronology
Roberto Carlos em Ritmo de Aventura (1967)	O Inimitável (1968)	Canzoni Per Te (1968)

O Inimitável is the eighth studio album by the Brazilian singer and writer Roberto Carlos, that was released in 1968.

== The album ==
This album was the first to be released after Carlos leaver the Jovem Guard Program, by TV Record, the album "O Inimitável" is contemplate to be the transition album of the singer, although he still tries to bring the characteristics of that genre. This album, Carlos used the influenced of funk and Tropicália to transition from Jovem Guarda which is better known as pós-Jovem Guarda. at the time, the title of this album refers to singers that try to copy him, like, for example, the singer Paulo Sérgio.

Along with the first track of this LP, with the song "E Não Vou Mais Deixar Você Tão Só" (written by Antônio Marcos), it is noted the changed, when the past albums have naive tracks like ("Aquele Beijo que te Dei", "É Tempo de Amar" or "Gosto do Jeitinho dela"). This was a change of the repertoire of tracks, that gradually change his own genre, passing to priority more mature and complex songs, being his first soul work, basically, more deep and shrill songs like "Se Você Pensa" and "As Curvas da Estrada de Santos" from the later album. the two biggest hits of "O Inimitável" was the track "Eu Te Amo, Te Amo, Te Amo" and "As Canções Que Você Fez Pra Mim" (both collaboration with Erasmo Carlos).

"O Inimitável" is also remember of the flirting of Carlos with American soul and funk, like in "Se Você Pensa" (with Erasmo Carlos) and "Ciúme de Você" (by Luiz Ayrão) – the two biggest hits of this album, in addition to the already cite As Canções que Você Fez pra Mim. The track "Madrasta" was the first and the only song to be defend in concert of the singer to be on this LP and to have a big harmonic complexity, being very hard to sing.

This LP was select in a list of the Brazilian version of the magazine Rolling Stone, being the 82nd best Brazilian album of all time.

== Track listing ==
No.	Title	Writer(s)	Length
1.	"E Não Vou Mais Deixar Você Tão Só"	Antônio Marcos	3:32
2.	"Ninguém Vai Tirar Você De Mim"	Hélio Justo, Edson Ribeiro	2:57
3.	"Se Você Pensa"	Roberto Carlos, Erasmo Carlos	2:41
4.	"É Meu, É Meu, É Meu"	Roberto Carlos, Erasmo Carlos	3:08
5.	"Quase Fui Lhe Procurar"	Getúlio Côrtes	3:26
6.	"Eu Te Amo, Te Amo, Te Amo"	Roberto Carlos, Erasmo Carlos	3:59
7.	"As Canções Que Você Fez Pra Mim"	Roberto Carlos, Erasmo Carlos	3:31
8.	"Nem Mesmo Você"	Helena dos Santos	2:39
9.	"Ciúme de Você"	Luiz Ayrão	3:02
10.	"Não Há Dinheiro Que Pague"	Renato Barros	2:37
11.	"O Tempo Vai Apagar"	Getúlio Côrtes, Paulo César Barros	3:37
12.	"Madrasta"	Beto Ruschel, Renato Teixeira	4:12

== Charts ==
year-end chart performance for O Inimitável
Chart (1969)	Peak position
Brazil (Nopem)	1

== Certifications ==
Certifications for O Inimitável
Region	Certification	Certified units/sales
Brazil (Pro-Música Brasil)	Diamond	1,000,000^{‡}
^{‡} Sales+streaming figures based on certification alone.
