= Clarisse Leite =

Brazilian composer (1917–2003)

Clarisse Leite Dias Baptista
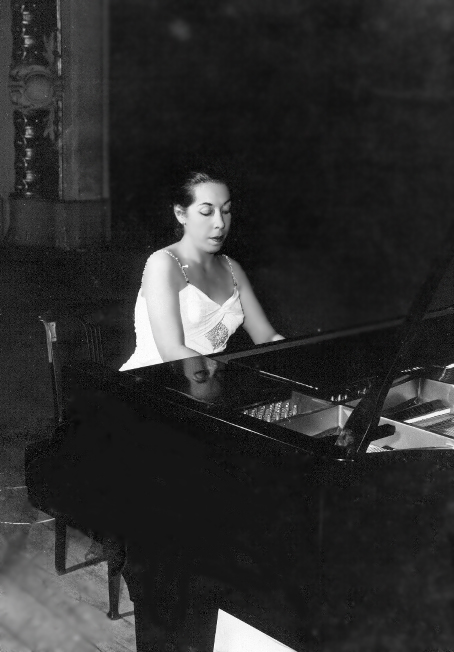
- Clarisse Leite, Teatro Municipal de São Paulo
- Born: Clarisse Leite; January 11, 1917; São Paulo, Brazil
- Died: May 11, 2003 (aged 86); São Paulo, Brazil
- Education: São Paulo Drama and Music Conservatory
- Known for: Music
- Notable work: Concerto Números Um e Dois Para Piano e Orquestra, composições
- Spouse: César Dias Baptista (m. 1943)
- Children: Arnaldo Dias Baptista; Sérgio Dias Baptista

Clarisse Leite Dias Baptista (January 11, 1917 – May 11, 2003) was a Brazilian composer, pianist and music educator and primarily composed for the piano. Leite developed her own style of teaching piano called Ginástica Anatômica (Anatomic Gym) and was a member of the International Academy of Music.

== Early life and education ==
Clarisse Leite was born in São Paulo on January 11, 1917 into a musical family, her maternal grandfather Laurentino Mendes de Moraes composed songs for a band in Paraibuna and her aunt Benedita Borges de Moraes was a pianist. Her elder sister Zilda, also a pianist, taught Leite piano at a young age. The two sisters had an agreement that whenever Zilda went out, Clarisse would play the piano in her place so their mother would not notice Zilda had left.

At the age of six, Leite earned a place at the prestigious São Paulo Drama and Music Conservatory. There she studied piano with Zilda and José Kliass at the São Paulo Drama and Music Conservatory, in addition to studying composition under Teodoro Nogueira and José Wancolle, orchestration with Orestes Farinello and harmony with João Sepe. When she first attended her History of Music class, her teacher Mário de Andrade was surprised to see a little girl in his class, telling Leite "Young lady, you don't belong here". She graduated from the conservatory at the age of thirteen. Leite was granted a scholarship by the conservatory to study in France in 1930. However, she never left, probably due to the 1932 Constitutionalist Revolution in Brazil. In 1932, Leite won the Gomes Cardin gold medal for piano.

== Career ==
After completing her studies, she worked as a teacher at several institutes in São Paulo including the Escola Superior de Música S Marcelina, the Pius XII Music College, the Lavignac Conservatory, the Beethoven Institute in São Vicente and the Conservatory in Tatuí. She was also professor of music at the Academia Internacional de Musica in Rio de Janeiro. Between 1963 and 1977, Leite was the state supervisor of music in Bauru. While teaching, she developed her own technique to teach piano to students called Ginástica Anatômica (Anatomic Gym). She also founded the Clarisse Leite piano contests. Influenced by her role as a piano teacher, she wrote and dedicated pieces for her students inspired by childhood themes in various technical difficulty levels, which she then used in her own lessons.

She frequently toured around São Paulo state as well as Austria and Hungary. Leite worked together with the Japanese Consulate in Brazil in order to promote Japanese music in Brazil and toured around the country playing Japanese music. She also wrote several compositions with Japanese titles including Hyôga ("Fluctuating Ice") and Anata o Aisuru ("I love you").

== Personal life and death ==
In August 1941, Leite met César Dias Baptista at her family's apartment through a mutual friend. Within ten days of meeting, Dias Baptista proposed marriage, and the two wed two months later on 19 October. Their sons Cláudio César Dias Baptista, Arnaldo Dias Baptista and Sérgio Dias Baptista all became rock musicians.

Leite died in São Paulo on May 11, 2003, at the age of 86.

== Works ==
Leite composed for orchestra, chamber, piano and vocal performance. She was known for compositions based on Brazilian folklore. Selected works include:

- Suite Nordestina (1971) including 1) Baticum, 2) Prece por Maria Bonita (A Prayer to Maria Bonita) and 3) Jacunços (Gunmen)
- Duo concertante no. 1 for pianos

- Feche os olhinhos que o soninho vem (Close your eyes and the sleep will come) (berceuse) for piano solo - Dança dos esquilos (dance of the squirrels)(maxi-slide) for piano solo - Vendaval (gale) (Fantasia) for piano solo - Yoga - (Espumas flutuantes) (Yoga - floating foams) for piano solo

Her works have been recorded and issued on CD, including:

- Brasileira: Piano Music by Brazilian Women, 2004, Centaur Records
