= Mutantes (album) =

Studio album by Os Mutantes
- Released: February 1969
- Recorded: December 1968 in Estúdio Scatena
- Genre: Psychedelic pop, tropicália
- Length: 42:45
- Label: Polydor (Brazil), Omplatten (United States - 1999), Universal (worldwide/USA - 2006)
- Producer: Manoel Bareinbein (Album producer for Polydor), Jeff Gibson, Johan Kugelberg (Reissue producers for Omplatten)

Os Mutantes chronology
Os Mutantes (1968)	Mutantes (1969)	A Divina Comédia ou Ando Meio Desligado (1970)

Professional ratings
Review scores
Source	Rating
Allmusic	4/5 stars

Mutantes (transl. Mutants) is the second album by the Brazilian tropicalia band Os Mutantes. The album was originally released in 1969 and reissued in 1999 on Omplatten Records, and again in 2006 by Omplatten's (and Polydor's) parent company Universal Records.

It was listed by Rolling Stone Brazil at #44 on the 100 best Brazilian albums in history list. One of its singles, "2001", was also voted by the magazine as the 90th greatest Brazilian song.

== Track listing ==
All tracks are written by Arnaldo Baptista, Rita Lee and Sérgio Dias except where noted.

Side one
No.	Title	Writer(s)	Lead vocals	Length
1.	"Dom Quixote"		Arnaldo Baptista, Rita Lee and Sérgio Dias	3:55
2.	"Não vá se perder por aí"	Raphael Vilardi, Roberto Loyola	Baptista, Lee and Dias	3:16
3.	"Dia 36"	Arnaldo Baptista, Johnny Dandurand, Rita Lee, Sérgio Dias	Baptista	4:02
4.	"2001" (titled "Dois mil e um" on 2006 CD release)	Rita Lee, Tom Zé	Baptista, Lee, Zé do Rancho and Mariazinha	3:58
5.	"Algo mais"		Lee and Dias	2:39
6.	"Fuga Nº II dos Mutantes" (titled simply "Fuga N° II" on CD releases)		Lee	3:43

Side two
No.	Title	Writer(s)	Lead vocals	Length
7.	"Banho de Lua (Tintarella di luna)"	B. Filippi, F. Migiacci - Version: Fred Jorge	Lee	3:41
8.	"Ritta Lee" (spelled "Rita Lee" on CD releases)		Dias	3:10
9.	"Mágica"		Baptista, Lee and Dias	4:38
10.	"Qualquer bobagem"	Arnaldo Baptista, Rita Lee, Sérgio Dias, Tom Zé	Baptista	4:37
11.	"Caminhante noturno"		Baptista, Lee and Dias	5:10

== Personnel ==
Os Mutantes

- Rita Lee: vocals (tracks 1, 2, 4, 5, 6, 7, 9, 11), percussion, theremin, autoharp, recorder
- Arnaldo Baptista: vocals (tracks 1, 2, 3, 4, 5, 9, 10, 11), bass and keyboards
- Sérgio Dias: guitars, vocals (1, 2, 5, 8, 9, 11) and bass; drums in "Fuga Nº II dos Mutantes"

with:

- Dinho Leme (credited as "Sir Ronaldo I Du Rancharia"): Drums
- Zé do Rancho & Mariazinha - (respectively) Viola caipira (Brazilian country acoustic guitar) and accordion; vocals on track 4
- Cláudio César Dias Baptista (simply credited as "Claudio") - electronics construction (Regulus guitar [Golden Guitar])
- Rogério Duprat: Orchestral arrangements
