= Trocabrahma =

Trocabrahma is a music and visual art cultural exchange programme produced annually by Brahma beer. It began in 2006 with a group of UK musicians visiting Brazil to collaborate with Brazilian musicians. Trocabrahma took place again in 2007 with a different group musicians. In addition to music and art exchanges, Trocabrahma also has a street art project, online community and podcast series.

== Concept ==
Trocabrahma is called a "culture jam" by its organisers. It is a venture sponsored by which involves international exchange between musicians and artists from the UK and Brazil. The music exchanges take place in São Paulo. The musicians meet and collaborate for one week in Brazil and then meet again in the UK to showcase their new material in a series of concerts in London, Liverpool and Glasgow. Many of the musicians involved have never before visited each other's countries.

The street art collaboration involves graffiti artists from the UK working with a Brazilian street artist. Similar to the musicians, the artists meet in the UK and improvise around themes associated with the project.

Trocabrahma is an example of viral marketing and encourages an online community to interact with the exchange programme through a blog and community profiles.

== Trocabrahma 2007 ==
In 2007, Trocabrahma took the following group of UK musicians to São Paulo, Brazil: JD Twitch from the nightclub Optimo, Ben Westbeech, King Creosote, Gruff Rhys from the group Super Furry Animals, Four Tet, Radioclit and Amanda Blank. Although the latter two acts are included as UK musicians the production duo Radioclit consist of one Swedish member and one French member and Amanda Blank is from United States.

The Brazilian musicians who collaborated with the UK artists are: Os Mutantes, Tita Lima, Rômulo Fróes, Tony Da Gatorra, Open Field Church and Bonde Do Rolê.

The street art collaboration took place between Brazilian artist Speto and three UK-based street artists, Aztec from London, Sam Skinner from Liverpool and As One from Glasgow.

The music exchanges took place in São Paulo in May and June 2007. The art exchange occurred in the UK in July 2007.

At the end of July 2007 a series of musical concerts were staged in London, Liverpool and Glasgow to showcase the new work created by the musicians during the exchange.

== Podcast ==
The 2007 Trocabrahma Podcast series documents the exchanges and includes live music recordings from the concert series. Photographs are included in the enhanced podcast version of the series and also present on the project's Flickr profile.

The series is hosted by DJ and producer Diplo and in addition to the musicians and artists who collaborated as part of Trocabrahma 2007, includes contributions from Gilles Peterson, who presented the 2006 podcast series called "Gilles Peterson in Brazil", CSS, Echo & the Bunnymen, Ladytron, The Bees, The Zutons, Joe Davis from Far Out Recordings, Zeep, and a variety of other, lesser-known musicians and artists.

The podcast was produced by Inner Ear and was nominated in the best podcast category 2008 BT Digital Music Awards.

== See also ==
- Music podcast
