= Os Mutantes (album) =

Studio album by Os Mutantes
- Released: June 1968
- Recorded: December 1967 – January 1968
- Studios: Philips Studios, Brazil
- Genres: Tropicália; psychedelic pop; psychedelic rock
- Length: 36:01
- Languages: Brazilian Portuguese, French
- Label: Polydor
- Producer: Manoel Barenbein

Os Mutantes chronology
Os Mutantes (1968)	Mutantes (1969)

Professional ratings
Review scores
Source	Rating
About	5/5 stars
Allmusic	4.5/5 stars
Crawdaddy!	(favorable)

Os Mutantes (Brazilian Portuguese: [uz muˈtɐ̃tʃis], "the mutants") is the debut album by the Brazilian tropicalia band Os Mutantes. It was originally released in 1968 by Polydor and blends traditional Brazilian music styles with American and British psychedelia. The album includes a cover of The Mamas & The Papas' "Once Was a Time I Thought", translated into "Tempo no Tempo", and a cover of "Le premier bonheur du jour", previously recorded by Françoise Hardy. It was reissued in 1999 on Omplatten Records and again in 2006 by Omplatten's (and Polydor's) parent company, Universal Records.

The album has received critical acclaim around the world, and was put at #12 on Mojo magazine list of "50 Most Out-There Albums of All Time". It appears at number 9 on Rolling Stone magazine's list of 100 greatest Brazilian albums of all time. It is also listed at 39 on Rolling Stone's "Top 40 Stoner albums". It also appears at number 9 on the Rolling Stones's 10 Greatest Latin Rock Albums of All Time.

== Background ==
Os Mutantes made their public debut as a band in 1966 at a TV Record show, which went on air before the Jovem Guarda show, called O Pequeno Mundo de Ronnie Von. The band was in charge of the soundtrack, mostly playing rock versions of erudite compositions, and also covering hits of The Beatles and other bands. After their debut, the band was invited to be a part of many other shows, including Jovem Guarda itself, but they ended up being rejected because they wouldn't accept the many instruments the band would use on stage.

In 1967 they met Gilberto Gil through avant-garde composer Rogério Duprat. With Gil, Mutantes recorded his songs "Bom Dia" and "Domingo No Parque" and debuted the latter at the II Festival de Música Popular Brasileira (Second Festival of Popular Brazilian Music) where the band won second prize. After that Mutantes started to get more involved with Gil's new Tropicália movement and took part in many notable events at the movement's onset. When performing their dig at Brazil's military dictatorship entitled "É Proibido Proibir" (It is Forbidden to Forbid) at the III Festival Internacional da Canção, the audience booed them. They also took part in the show Divino, Maravilhoso, which was the last major Tropicália event. The band contributed the title track to the Tropicália movement's audio-manifesto, the compilation album Tropicália: ou Panis et Circencis. The band also played on albums by fellow tropicalistas Gilberto Gil and Caetano Veloso, as well as television commercials and jingles for the Shell Corporation.

Os Mutantes self-titled debut LP came out in 1968 and led with the Gil/Veloso composition "Panis Et Circenses" with arrangements by Duprat. The song, which had also appeared on the Tropicália compilation, critiqued the bourgeoisie living complacently under Brazil's oppressive military rule. The band covered "Once Was A Time I Thought" (translated and renamed “Tempo No Tempo”) by California pop act The Mamas and the Papas, and rendered a version of “Le Premier Bonheur Du Jour” by French yé-yé singer Françoise Hardy, which singer Rita Lee embellished with the sound of an aerosol can shooting out bursts of FLIT bug spray. Cover versions of Jorge Ben's "A Minha Menina", Gal Costa's "Baby," and the Sivuca/Miriam Makeba international baião-inspired hit "Adeus Maria Fulô" also appeared on the record in new psychedelicized arrangements.

== Reception ==
In retrospective reviews following the album's re-release more than three decades after its recording, AllMusic called the album "a wildly inventive trip that assimilates orchestral pop, whimsical psychedelia, musique concrète, found-sound environments, [as well as] fuzztone guitars and go-go basslines," concluding that "it's far more experimental than any of the albums produced by the era's first-rate psychedelic bands of Britain or America." Crawdaddy stated that non-Portuguese speakers "might have no idea what the psychedelic popsters are singing about, but the wild inventiveness and playful hooks of their debut speak loudly enough. The record was deeply influenced by the music coming out of the US and the UK at the time, but [...] Os Mutantes were breaking new ground." Author John Bush labelled the album "crazed psychedelic pop" and a "raucous, entertaining mess of a record featuring long passages of environmental sounds, tape music, and tortured guitar lines no self-respecting engineer would've allowed in the mix." Ultimate Classic Rock called it one of the top 25 psychedelic rock albums.

== Track listing ==
Side one
No.	Title	Writer(s)	Lead vocals	Length
1.	"Panis et Circenses"	Gilberto Gil, Caetano Veloso	Arnaldo Baptista, Rita Lee and Sérgio Dias	3:40
2.	"A Minha Menina"	Jorge Ben	Jorge Ben and Baptista	4:45
3.	"O Relógio"	Arnaldo Baptista, Rita Lee, Sérgio Dias	Lee	3:31
4.	"Adeus, Maria Fulô"	Sivuca, Humberto Teixeira	Baptista, Lee and Dias	3:06
5.	"Baby"	Caetano Veloso	Baptista	3:01
6.	"Senhor F"	Arnaldo Baptista, Rita Lee, Sérgio Dias	Dias	2:35

Side two
No.	Title	Writer(s)	Lead vocals	Length
7.	"Bat Macumba"	Gilberto Gil, Caetano Veloso	Baptista, Lee and Dias	3:10
8.	"Le premier bonheur du jour"	Franck Gérald, Jean Renard	Lee	3:39
9.	"Trem Fantasma"	Caetano Veloso, Arnaldo Baptista, Rita Lee, Sérgio Dias	Baptista and Lee	3:18
10.	"Tempo no Tempo"	John Phillips – Version: Arnaldo Baptista, Rita Lee, Sérgio Dias	Baptista, Lee and Dias	1:47
11.	"Ave Gengis Khan"	Arnaldo Baptista, Rita Lee, Sérgio Dias	Baptista, Lee and Dias	3:48

== Personnel ==
- Rogério Duprat: arrangement

Os Mutantes

- Rita Lee – vocals (1, 3, 4, 7, 8, 9, 10, 11), recorder, autoharp, percussion
- Sérgio Dias – vocals (1, 4, 6, 7, 10, 11), guitars
- Arnaldo Baptista – vocals (1, 4, 5, 7, 9, 10, 11), keyboards, bass

Special guests

- Dirceu: drums
- Jorge Ben: vocals and acoustic guitar (in "A Minha Menina")
- Dr. César Baptista: vocals (in "Ave, Gengis Khan")
- Clarisse Leite: piano in "Senhor F"
- Cláudio Baptista: electronics
- Gilberto Gil: percussion (in "Bat Macumba")
