= Lucinha Turnbull =

- Born: Lúcia Maria Turnbull; 22 April 1953 (age 73); São Paulo, Brazil
- Occupations: Singer, composer, guitarist
- Instrument: Guitar

Lúcia Maria Turnbull, known as Lucinha Turnbull (born 22 April 1953), is a Brazilian singer, composer and guitarist, considered the first woman electric guitarist in Brazil.

== Biography ==
Born in São Paulo, Turnbull is daughter of a Scottish father and a Brazilian mother. She got her first guitar when she was 13. When she was 16 years old she moved to London, where she joined the folk group The Solid British Hat Band. Returning to Brazil in 1972, she did the opening show for Os Mutantes at the Teatro Oficina in São Paulo. After that, she formed the short-lived duo As Cilibrinas do Éden with Rita Lee and participated of the Festival Phono 73. In 1973, Turnbull became guitarist and vocalist, together with Lee, in the Tutti Frutti band, with which she toured Brazil. In 1976, she formed the group Bandolim and participated in the musical "Rocky Horror Show".

In 1977 Turnbull sang the vocals of "Refavela" and "Refestança" with Gilberto Gil and Rita Lee. Along her career, she has played and sung in albums by Caetano Veloso ("Cinema transcendental"), Rita Lee ("Babilônia"), Moraes Moreira ("Lá vem o Brasil descendo a ladeira"), Guilherme Arantes ("Corações paulistas") and Erasmo Carlos ("Erasmo convida"), among others. In 1980, she launched her first LP, Aroma, produced by Perinho Santana. Her song "Bobagem (w/ Rita Lee) was included in the Cássia Eller album Marginal. She has worked with Suely Mesquita, Mauro Santa Cecília, Mathilda Kóvak and Marcio Lomiranda.

== Awards ==
- 1974 – Best Rhythmical Guitar of Brazil awarded by Revista Pop.
