= Mutantes e Seus Cometas no País do Baurets =

Studio album by Os Mutantes
- Released: May 1972
- Recorded: October–November 1971
- Genre: Psychedelic rock, rock and roll, progressive rock
- Length: 45:54
- Label: Polydor (Brazil), Omplatten (United States)
- Producer: Arnaldo Baptista

Os Mutantes chronology
Jardim Elétrico (1971)	Mutantes e Seus Cometas no País do Baurets (1972)	Tudo Foi Feito Pelo Sol (1974)

Professional ratings
Review scores
Source	Rating
Allmusic	4/5 stars

Mutantes e Seus Cometas no País do Baurets (transl. Mutants and Their Comets in the Country of Weed) is the fifth album by the Brazilian rock band Os Mutantes, released in 1972. It is their last official release with vocalist Rita Lee; they would record and release Hoje É o Primeiro Dia do Resto da Sua Vida later in that same year, but it would be considered a Lee solo album due to the label being more confident on her success than theirs. The album's cover art is by comic artist Alain Voss.

== Track listing ==
Side one; writing credits per source
No.	Title	Writer(s)	Lead vocals	Length
1.	"Posso Perder Minha Mulher, Minha Mãe, Desde que Eu Tenha o Rock and Roll"	Arnaldo Baptista, Rita Lee, Liminha	Arnaldo Baptista	3:43
2.	"Vida de Cachorro"	Arnaldo Baptista, Rita Lee, Sérgio Dias	Rita Lee	3:15
3.	"Dune Buggy"	Arnaldo Baptista, Rita Lee, Sérgio Dias	Arnaldo Baptista	5:23
4.	"Cantor de Mambo"	Arnaldo Baptista, Élcio Decário, Rita Lee	Arnaldo Baptista	4:37
5.	"Beijo Exagerado" "Todo Mundo Pastou"	Arnaldo Baptista, Rita Lee, Sérgio Dias; Ismar S. Andrade "Bororó"	Arnaldo Baptista; Sérgio Dias and Rita Lee	4:49

Side two; writing credits per source
No.	Title	Writer(s)	Lead vocals	Length
6.	"Balada do Louco"	Arnaldo Baptista, Rita Lee	Sérgio Dias	4:01
7.	"A Hora e a Vez do Cabelo Nascer"	Arnaldo Baptista, Rita Lee, Sérgio Dias, Liminha	Arnaldo Baptista	3:30
8.	"Rua Augusta"	Hervé Cordovil	Rita Lee	4:05
9.	"Mutantes e Seus Cometas no País do Baurets"	Arnaldo Baptista, Rita Lee, Sérgio Dias, Liminha, Dinho Leme	Arnaldo Baptista, Rita Lee and Sérgio Dias	9:49
10.	"Todo Mundo Pastou II"	Ismar S. Andrade "Bororó"	Arnaldo Baptista, Sérgio Dias and Rita Lee	2:25

== Personnel ==
Os Mutantes

- Arnaldo Baptista: vocals (tracks 1, 3, 4, 5, 7, 9, 10), keyboards
- Rita Lee: vocals (tracks 2, 5,8, 9, 10), synthesizers, backing vocal
- Sérgio Dias: vocals (tracks 3, 5, 6, 9, 10), guitars, sitar
- Liminha: bass, backing vocal
- Dinho Leme: drums
