= A Divina Comédia ou Ando Meio Desligado =

Studio album by Os Mutantes
- Released: March 1970
- Recorded: October 1969
- Genre: Psychedelic rock
- Length: 41:52
- Labels: Polydor (Brazil); Omplatten (U.S.)
- Producers: Arnaldo Saccomani (album producer for Polydor); Jeff Gibson, Johan Kugelberg (reissue producers for Omplatten)

Os Mutantes chronology
Mutantes (1969)	A Divina Comédia ou Ando Meio Desligado (1970)	Jardim Elétrico (1971)

Professional ratings
Review scores
Source	Rating
Allmusic	4/5 stars

A Divina Comédia ou Ando Meio Desligado (transl. The Divine Comedy or I Have Been a Little Off) is the third album by the Brazilian rock band Os Mutantes. The album was originally released in 1970 and reissued in 1999 on Omplatten Records and again in 2006 by Omplatten's (and Polydor's) parent company, Universal Records. The second track features the band imitating California accents. The album as a whole is characterized by a mix of psychedelic and religious imagery.

It's also the first album by the band to break away from the Tropicália aesthetic, and move towards more of a pure rock sound. Except for a tongue-in-cheek version of the ballad "Chão de Estrelas", the record shows little Brazilian music influence. This shift in direction is speculated to be because their helpers and influences, Tropicalismo stars Caetano Veloso and Gilberto Gil were exiled by the Brazilian military dictatorship.

The album cover reflects a similar illustration by Gustav Doré from Dante's Divine Comedy.

It was listed by Rolling Stone Brazil at #22 in the list of 100 best Brazilian albums in history. The magazine also elected the title song "Ando Meio Desligado" as the 50th greatest Brazilian song.

== Track listing ==
Side one
No.	Title	Writer(s)	Lead vocals	Length
1.	"Ando Meio Desligado"	Arnaldo Baptista, Rita Lee, Sérgio Dias	Rita Lee and Sérgio Dias	4:47
2.	"Quem Tem Medo de Brincar de Amor"	Baptista, Lee	Lee and Dias	3:40
3.	"Ave, Lúcifer"	Baptista, Lee, Élcio Decário	Lee and Arnaldo Baptista	2:22
4.	"Desculpe, Babe"	Baptista, Lee	Dias	2:53
5.	"Meu Refrigerador Não Funciona"	Baptista, Lee, Dias	Baptista and Lee	6:34

Side two
No.	Title	Writer(s)	Lead vocals	Length
6.	"Hey Boy"	Baptista, Decário	Lee	2:50
7.	"Preciso Urgentemente Encontrar um Amigo"	Roberto Carlos, Erasmo Carlos	Baptista, Lee and Dias	3:50
8.	"Chão de Estrelas"	Orestes Barbosa, Sílvio Caldas	Baptista	3:16
9.	"Jogo de Calçada"	Baptista, Wandler Cunha, Ilton Oliveira	Baptista, Lee and Dias	3:35
10.	"Haleluia"	Baptista	Baptista, Lee and Dias	3:49
11.	"Oh! Mulher Infiel"	Baptista	Baptista	4:31

== Personnel ==
Os Mutantes

- Arnaldo Baptista: vocals (tracks 2, 3, 5, 7, 8, 9, 10, 11), keyboards and bass
- Rita Lee: vocals (tracks 1, 2, 3, 5, 6, 7, 9, 10), percussion, theremin, autoharp, recorder
- Sérgio Dias: vocals (tracks 1, 2, 3, 4, 7, 9, 10), guitars, bass (track 5)

with:

- Rogério Duprat: orchestral arrangements
- Liminha: bass (tracks 2, 4, 6, 7)
- Dinho Leme: drums
- Raphael Villardi: acoustic guitar (tracks 3, 8) and vocals (track 3)
- Naná Vasconcelos: percussion (tracks 1, 4), congas
