= Build Up =

Studio album by Rita Lee
- Released: 1970
- Recorded: 1970 in Estúdio Scatena, São Paulo
- Genre: Rock, pop
- Length: 30:14
- Language: Portuguese, English
- Label: Polydor
- Producer: Manuel Barenbein

Rita Lee chronology
Build Up (1970)	Hoje É o Primeiro Dia do Resto da Sua Vida (1972)

Singles from Build Up
- 1. "José (Joseph)" Released: 1970; 2. "And I Love Him" Released: 1970

Professional ratings
Review scores
Source	Rating
Allmusic	4/5 stars

Build Up is the solo debut by Rita Lee, originally released in 1970 during her time with Os Mutantes. Despite the moderate success of the single "José (Joseph)", the album failed to captivate listeners in Brazil. Due to the revived interest in Os Mutantes, the album has since gained a cult following in recent years with many considering it be one of her finest efforts.

== Track listing ==
Side one
No.	Title	Writer(s)	Length
1.	"Sucesso, Aqui Vou Eu (Build Up)"	Arnaldo Baptista, Rita Lee	2:44
2.	"Calma"	Arnaldo Baptista	3:15
3.	"Viagem ao Fundo de Mim"	Rita Lee	2:48
4.	"Precisamos de Irmãos"	Élcio Decário	2:41
5.	"Macarrão com Linguiça e Pimentão"	Arnaldo Baptista, Rita Lee	3:03

Side two
No.	Title	Writer(s)	Length
6.	"José (Joseph)"	Georges Moustaki; Translation to portuguese by Nara Leão	3:07
7.	"Hulla-Hulla"	Élcio Decário, Rita Lee	3:07
8.	"And I Love Him"	Lennon–McCartney	3:04
9.	"Tempo Nublado"	Élcio Decário, Rita Lee	2:46
10.	"Prisioneira do Amor"	Élcio Decário	2:24
11.	"Eu Vou Me Salvar"	Élcio Decário, Rita Lee	2:31

== Personnel ==
- Rita Lee: vocals

Special guests:

- Rogério Duprat - orchestral arrangements
- Os Mutantes
- Alexander Gordin (Lanny Gordin) - guitar
- Diogenes - drums
- Sergio - bass guitar
