= O A e o Z =

Studio album by Os Mutantes
- Released: 1992
- Recorded: 1973 in Estúdio Eldorado, São Paulo
- Genre: Progressive rock, psychedelic rock, jazz fusion
- Length: 48:16
- Label: Polydor
- Producer: Peninha Schmidt, Allan Watts, Os Mutantes

Os Mutantes chronology
Tudo Foi Feito Pelo Sol (1974)	O A e o Z (1992)	Tecnicolor (2000)

Professional ratings
Review scores
Source	Rating
Allmusic	3/5 stars

O A e o Z (also known as A e o Z, or "A" e o "Z", Portuguese: The A and the Z) is an album by Brazilian rock band Os Mutantes. It was their first record without founding member Rita Lee, and marked a shift in their sound to progressive rock. Recorded in 1973, but shelved until 1992, this was Arnaldo Baptista's last studio record with the group.

== Track listing ==
All tracks are written by Arnaldo Baptista, Sérgio Dias, Liminha and Dinho Leme.

No.	Title	Length
1.	"'A' e o 'Z'"	8:39
2.	"Rolling Stone"	6:14
3.	"Você Sabe"	6:27
4.	"Hey Joe"	12:20
5.	"Uma Pessoa Só"	7:31
6.	"Ainda Vou Transar com Você"	7:14

== Personnel ==
Os Mutantes

- Arnaldo Baptista – Hammond organ L100, Mellotron M400, Hohner clavinet C, cello, lead and backing vocals
- Sérgio Dias – electric (Régulus II and Fender Stratocaster) and 12-string acoustic guitars, sitar, lead and backing vocals
- Liminha – bass guitar (Regulus and Rickenbacker 4001), acoustic guitar, backing vocals
- Dinho Leme – drums, tabla, backing vocals
