= Tutti Frutti (Brazilian band) =

Brazilian rock band

- Origin: São Paulo, Brazil
- Genre: Rock
- Years active: 1971–1981, 1997–2007
- Labels: PolyGram, Som Livre, Capitol Records, RCA
- Members: Franklin Paolillo; Gilberto Nardo; Johnny Boy; Mr. Ruffino; Roy Carlini; Rubens Nardo; Sol Ribeiro
- Past members: Emilson Colantonio, Guilherme Bueno, Juba Gurgel, Lee Marcucci, Lúcia Turnbull, Marcos Posato, Marinho Thomaz, Naila Mello, Paulo Maurício, Renato Figueiredo, Roberto de Carvalho, Ronaldo Paschoa, Sérgio Della Monica, Simbas, Walter Bailot, Willie de Oliveira, Luiz Sergio Carlini

Tutti Frutti was a Brazilian rock band formed in the early 1970s by musicians living in the Pompeia neighbourhood, in São Paulo. Between 1973 and 1978, with leading guitarist Luís Sérgio Carlini, the band accompanied Rita Lee in her shows after she had left Os Mutantes. This proved to be a successful association, making Tutti Frutti one of the most prominent Brazilian rock groups in the 1970s. They recorded with Rita Lee several national hits as "Agora só Falta Você", "Esse Tal de Roque Enrow", "Ovelha Negra", "Corista de Rock", "Miss Brasil 2000" and "Jardins da Babilônia". After the association with her came to an end in 1978, the band continued to perform with lead singer Simbas until they finally broke up in 1981. Carlini, who owned the Tutti Frutti brand name, has attempted various other formations since then, achieving only limited success.

In 1981, various ex-members of the band joined to form a new rock group named Rádio Táxi, that went on to release a string of hit singles in the early/mid 80s.

Luís Sérgio Carlini died on 7 May 2026, at the age of 73.

== Formation ==
Current members

- Franklin Paolillo: drums
- Gilberto Nardo: vocals
- Johnny Boy: keyboards
- Mr. Ruffino: bass
- Roy Carlini: guitars
- Rubens Nardo: vocals
- Sol Ribeiro: vocals

Past members

- Luís Sérgio Carlini: guitars and vocals (died 2026)
- Emilson Colantonio
- Guilherme Bueno
- Juba Gurgel
- Lee Marcucci
- Lúcia Turnbull
- Marcos Posato
- Marinho Thomaz
- Naila Mello
- Paulo Maurício
- Renato Figueiredo
- Roberto de Carvalho (Rita Lee's husband)
- Ronaldo Paschoa
- Sérgio Della Monica
- Simbas
- Walter Bailot
- Willie de Oliveira

== Discography ==
=== Rita Lee & Tutti Frutti ===
- 1974 – Atrás do Porto Tem uma Cidade - Philips
- 1975 – Fruto Proibido - Som Livre
- 1975 – Hollywood Rock (compilation) - Polydor
- 1976 – Entradas e Bandeiras - Som Livre
- 1976 – "Cavaleiros negros"/"Tudo bem"/"Balada do amigo" (single) - Som Livre
- 1976 – O melhor de Rita Lee (compilation) - Phonogram
- 1977 – Refestança (live, with Gilberto Gil)
- 1978 – Babilônia

=== Tutti Frutti ===
- 1977 – Tutti Frutti - Capitol Records
- 1979 – Você (single) - EMI-Odeon
- 1980 – Você Sabe Qual o Melhor Remédio - RCA Victor
- 1980 – Tibet (guest participation)
