= Arnaldo Baptista =

Brazilian rock musician and composer

Arnaldo Dias Baptista
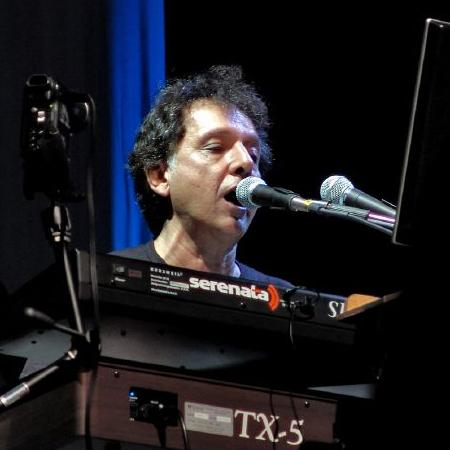
- Arnaldo Baptista in 2007

Background information
- Born: July 6, 1948 (age 78)
- Origin: São Paulo, SP; Brazil
- Genres: Psychedelic rock, piano rock, progressive rock, tropicalismo, experimental
- Occupations: Singer-songwriter, musician, painter, producer
- Instruments: Piano, vocals, organ, synthesizer, bass guitar, guitar, drums, cello, clavinet
- Years active: 1966–present
- Website: www.arnaldobaptista.com.br

Arnaldo Dias Baptista (Portuguese pronunciation: [aɾˈnawdu baˈtʃistɐ], born July 6, 1948) is a Brazilian rock musician and composer.

== Biography ==
Born to pianist, Clarisse Leite, and poet, César Dias Baptista, Baptista studied classical piano from 1955 to 1959, double bass from 1962 to 1963, and acoustic guitar from 1963 to 1965. In 1966 he formed the influential Os Mutantes band with his brother Sérgio Dias and Rita Lee, where he played bass guitar, keyboards and sang. Baptista left the band in 1973 due to disagreements with the other members of the band and the excessive use of LSD, of which he had been hospitalized for. In 1974 he tried to work as a musical producer, with no success. This motivated him to try a solo career, and in the same year, he released the album Lóki?, which is considered his best work by some critics.

Baptista recorded two albums with the band Patrulha do Espaço between 1977 and 1978, and later resumed his solo career. In 2006, Os Mutantes reunited without Rita Lee, and Baptista played with his brother Sérgio and drummer Dinho Leme 33 years after originally leaving the band. In 2007 Baptista left the band again to pursue personal projects.

Baptista currently lives with his wife, Lucinha Barbosa, in the city of Juiz de Fora, where he spends most of his time painting, singing and writing songs. He is a vegetarian.

== Discography ==
With Os Mutantes

- 1968: Os Mutantes
- 1969: Mutantes
- 1970: A Divina Comédia ou Ando Meio Desligado
- 1971: Jardim Elétrico
- 1972: Mutantes e Seus Cometas no País do Baurets
- 1992: O A e o Z (recorded in 1973)
- 2000: Tecnicolor (recorded in 1970)
- 2006: Mutantes Ao Vivo - Barbican Theatre, Londres 2006

Solo

- 1974: Lóki?
- 1982: Singin' Alone
- 1987: Disco Voador
- 2004: Let It Bed
- 2013: Shining Alone – Ao Vivo 1981 (recorded in 1981; digital distribution only)
- TBA: Esphera

With Patrulha do Espaço

- 1988: Elo Perdido (recorded in 1977)
- 1988: Faremos uma Noitada Excelente (recorded in 1978)
- 2013: Elo Mais Que Perdido (recorded in 1977; digital distribution only)

Tribute Albums

- 1989: Sanguinho Novo... Arnaldo Baptista Revisitado
- 1995: Onde É Que Está o Meu Rock and Roll?

== See also ==
- Os Mutantes
- Tropicália
