= Liminha (musician) =

Brazilian musician and producer (born 1951)

Arnolpho Lima Filho (born 5 May 1951 in São Paulo), known as Liminha, is a Brazilian musician and producer. He started his career as the bassist of "Os Baobás", and was called in 1970 to tour with Os Mutantes, becoming an official member later. In 1974, he left the group to start his producing career.

He produced albums of artists such as Ritchie, Gilberto Gil (he produced his Grammy Award winner album Eletroacústico), Os Paralamas do Sucesso, Kid Abelha, Ultraje a Rigor, Elis Regina, Barão Vermelho, Titãs, Raul Seixas, Guilherme Arantes, Gabriel, O Pensador, Belchior, Daniela Mercury, Ed Motta, João Gilberto, Luiz Melodia, Chico Science & Nação Zumbi, Fernanda Abreu, Lulu Santos, Oswaldo Montenegro, As Frenéticas, O Rappa, Jorge Ben Jor and Forfun. He co-wrote the song "Vamos Fugir" with Gilberto Gil, which was later covered by Skank.

== Discography ==
=== With Os Mutantes ===
- A Divina Comédia ou Ando Meio Desligado (1970)
- Jardim Elétrico (1971)
- Mutantes e Seus Cometas no País do Baurets (1972)
- O A e o Z (recorded in 1973/released in 1992)

=== As record producer (selected) ===
- Banda Black Rio - Maria Fumaça (1977)
- Os Paralamas do Sucesso - Selvagem? (1986)
- Titãs - Cabeça Dinossauro (1986)
- Titãs - Jesus Não Tem Dentes No País Dos Banguelas (1987)
- Titãs - Go Back (1988)
- Titãs - Õ Blésq Blom (1989)
- Daniela Mercury - O Canto da Cidade (1992)
- Chico Science & Nação Zumbi - Da Lama Ao Caos (1993)
- Daniela Mercury - Música de Rua (1994)
- O Rappa - Rappa Mundi (1996)
- Titãs - Acústico MTV (1997)
- Titãs - Volume Dois (1998)
- Os Paralamas do Sucesso - Arquivo II (2000)
- Titãs - Como Estão Vocês? (2003)
- Os Paralamas do Sucesso - Hoje (2005)
- Os Paralamas do Sucesso - Brasil Afora (2009)
