= Os Mutantes =

Brazilian rock band

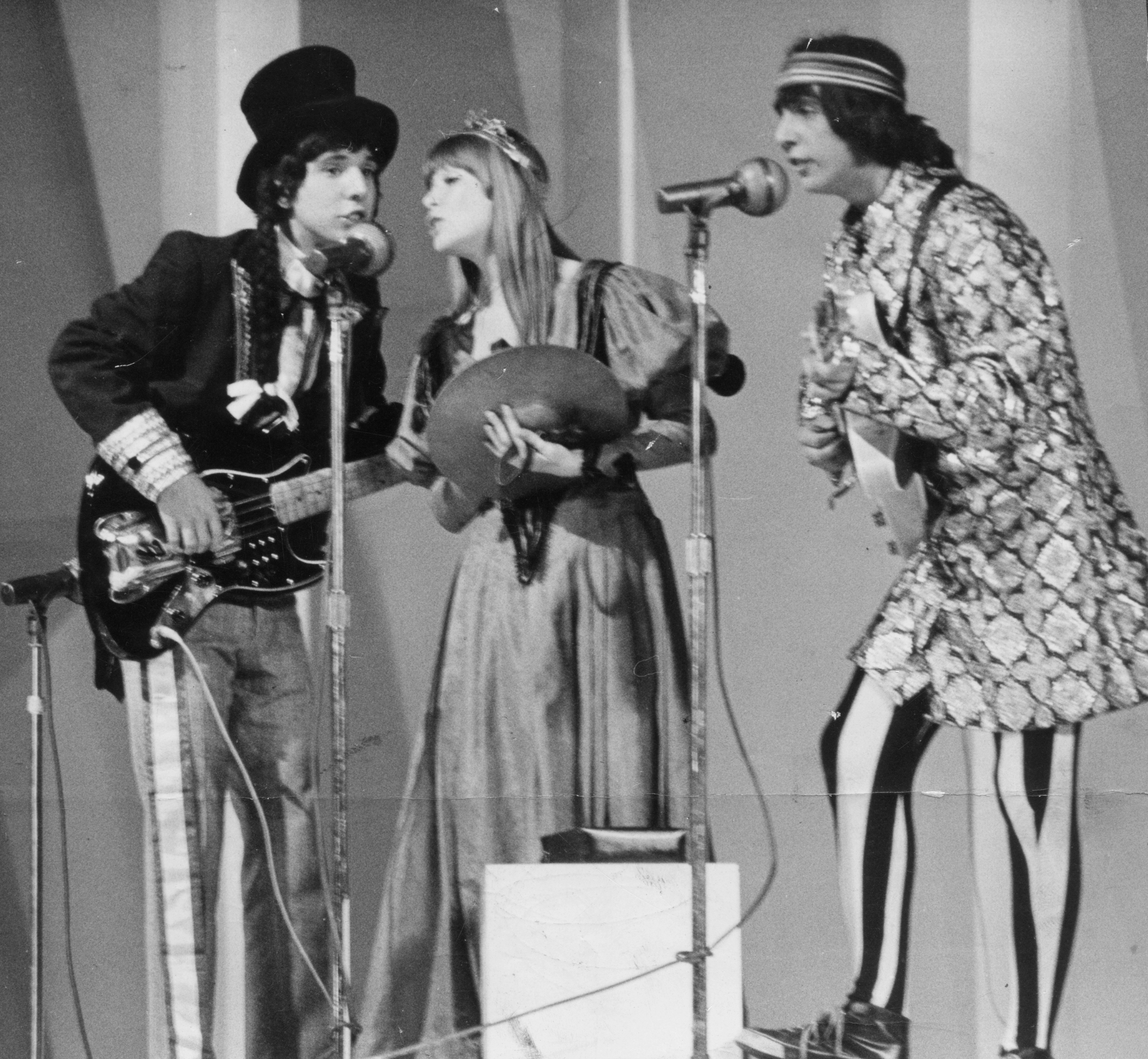
- Os Mutantes in 1969

Background information
- Origin: São Paulo, Brazil
- Genres: Tropicália; psychedelic rock; psychedelic pop; experimental rock; progressive rock (later)
- Years active: 1966–1978; 2006–present
- Labels: Polydor; Universal; Som Livre; Sony BMG (Brazil) Omplatten; Polydor; Universal; Luaka Bop; ANTI-; Krian Music Group (US)
- Members: Sérgio Dias; Esmeria Bulgari; Vinicius Junqueira; Camilo Macedo; Henrique Peters; Cláudio Tchernev
- Past members: Cláudio César Dias Baptista; Arnaldo Baptista; Rita Lee; Liminha; Dinho Leme; Manito; Rui Motta; Túlio Mourão; Antônio Pedro; Paulo de Castro; Fernando Gama; Zélia Duncan; Bia Mendes; Fabio Recco; Ani Cordero; Amy Crawford

Os Mutantes (Brazilian Portuguese: [uz muˈtɐ̃tʃis], The Mutants) is a Brazilian rock band that were linked with the Tropicália movement of the late 1960s. Heavily influenced by Anglo-American psychedelic pop, they bridged Brazilian sensibilities together with studio trickery, feedback, distortion, and musique concrète. They released their now-acclaimed self-titled debut album in 1968.

Os Mutantes formed as a trio in 1966. They backed Gilberto Gil on his 1968 self-titled album and were featured on the famous Tropicália: ou Panis et Circencis collective album that year. The group quickly became one of the main figures of the "new MPB" (popular Brazilian music) and Brazilian rock. Their 1970s work eventually moved toward progressive rock, with Lee leaving the group in 1972. They broke up in 1978. Throughout these twelve years, nine albums were recorded, although two of them – O A e o Z and Tecnicolor – were only released in the 1990s. It was during this later decade that Os Mutantes was recognized, by both national and international press, as an important act of the psychedelic era.

Although best known for its original line-up of Rita Lee, Arnaldo Baptista and Sérgio Dias, the band has gone through numerous personnel changes throughout its existence, with Dias being the band's sole consistent member; Liminha and Dinho Leme also joined the group later on. After a hiatus from the late 1970s to the early 2000s, the band reunited in 2006 without Lee, touring and recording new material.

== History ==
=== Origins ===
Os Mutantes were formed in São Paulo in 1966 by two brothers: Arnaldo Baptista (bass, keyboards and vocals) and Sérgio Dias Baptista (guitar and vocals), and lead singer Rita Lee. They were originally named Six Sided Rockers. The Baptistas' father was a poet and mother a pianist, and the two had previously had an all-male band called The Wooden Faces, while Lee was in an all-female band called The Teenage Singers. Sérgio Dias's guitar, the Golden Guitar (Guitarra de Ouro), was created by Arnaldo and Sérgio's brother, Cláudio César Dias Baptista, who built many of their instruments and electronic effects. Their current name was settled upon immediately before a performance on a Brazilian television program and given to them by Ronnie Von . The group until then called themselves Os Bruxos (meaning The Witches, in Portuguese) and the suggestion came from the book Emperor of the Mutants, by Stefan Wul (the book's original title in French is La Mort Vivante).

=== Tropicália ===
Through other TV performances, the band was able to meet Gilberto Gil, an influential musician in the Tropicália movement, who brought them into the movement's circle. Os Mutantes released two albums heavily influenced by Tropicália, which blended psychedelic rock with other forms of art. They performed and recorded with many artists of this period, including Caetano Veloso and Gilberto Gil, before Veloso and Gil were arrested and subsequently exiled by the military government of Brazil in early 1969. During this period, Os Mutantes were also threatened by the military government of Brazil of that time.

In 1967, Os Mutantes backed Gilberto Gil when he competed in the third annual Festival of Brazilian Popular Music, making Brazilian music history by being one of the first two rock groups to participate, and Gil won second prize in the song competition with his song "Domingo no Parque" ("Sunday in the Park"). Gil's friend Caetano Veloso also performed with a rock group, São Paulo band Beat Boys, and although his unorthodox performance met with some initial resistance, he eventually won over the crowd with his song "Alegria, Alegria", which was awarded fourth place in the competition. The next year Os Mutantes collaborated with Gilberto Gil on his second solo album, and they also contributed to the manifesto work of the Tropicália movement, the landmark 1968 album Tropicália: ou Panis et Circencis (Tropicália: or Bread and Circuses) a collaborative album recorded by all the major figures in the movement, including Os Mutantes, Gilberto Gll, Caetano Veloso, Gal Costa, and Tom Zé, with orchestrations by Rogerio Duprat and lyrical contributions from Torquato Neto.

In sharp contrast to their well-received festival appearance in 1967, the group famously met with intense hostility when they backed Caetano Veloso for his two now-legendary performances at the third Festival Internacional da Canção in Rio, which caused a near-riot. In the first round of the festival's song competition on 12 September 1968, Veloso and Os Mutantes were loudly jeered, booed and insulted by a large group of students in the audience, who were vehemently opposed to the Tropicalists' musical experiments, and who were further infuriated by Veloso's outlandish costume, and his provocatively sexual stage movements. In the second round of the competition on 15 September, Veloso and Os Mutantes performed a wild new psychedelic piece that Veloso had written for the occasion, called "É proibido proibir" ("It Is Forbidden to Forbid"); this was recorded live and an excerpt was later released as the b-side of the studio recording of the single. The students began heckling even before the ensemble took the stage, and throughout the song, the anti-Tropicalist faction in the audience jeered and booed so loudly that the performers could barely be heard. The students also began throwing eggs, fruit, vegetables and paper balls and a section of the audience stood up and turned their backs on the performers, to which Os Mutantes responded by turning their backs to the audience. Os Mutantes continued playing, but Veloso stopped singing and spontaneously launched into an impassioned diatribe, denouncing the student faction for their conservatism, which provoked even louder howls of disapproval from the audience. Although the ensemble was joined on stage by Gilberto Gil, who came out to show his support, the jeering continued unabated, so Veloso angrily declared that he would no longer participate in the competition; he then finished the song deliberately out of tune, and he, Gilberto and Os Mutantes left the stage arm-in-arm.

=== Mid-seventies ===
In 1971, bassist Arnolpho Lima Filho ("Liminha") and drummer Ronaldo Leme ("Dinho") officially joined the band. They released five albums together before Lee departed in 1972 to start a solo career. Rita Lee's 1972 album Hoje É o Primeiro Dia do Resto da Sua Vida was actually recorded with Os Mutantes but credited to Rita Lee due to record company disagreements. Subsequently, the band moved in a progressive rock direction with the album O A e o Z, recorded in 1973 but released only in 1992 due to disagreement with the record company. Arnaldo left the band in that year to pursue a solo career due to differences with other band members and problems with the abuse of LSD, followed by Dinho and, a year later, Liminha. Arnaldo subsequently was institutionalized and jumped from the building's window, causing a six-week coma. Sérgio Dias, the only remaining original member, led the band until its dissolution in 1978. During this time, they released one more studio album, a live album and an EP. Two unreleased albums were released many years later, the aforementioned O A e o Z and Tecnicolor recorded in 1970 and released in 2000.

=== Reunion ===
Os Mutantes (Arnaldo, Sérgio and Dinho, sans Rita Lee and Liminha—Lee was replaced with Zélia Duncan on vocals) played live for the first time since 1978 at the Tropicalia exhibition at London's Barbican Arts Centre on 22 May 2006. This performance, which was first by drummer Dinho Leme since the end of Os Mutantes, was followed by shows in New York City, Los Angeles (with the Flaming Lips), San Francisco, Seattle, Denver, Chicago, and Miami.

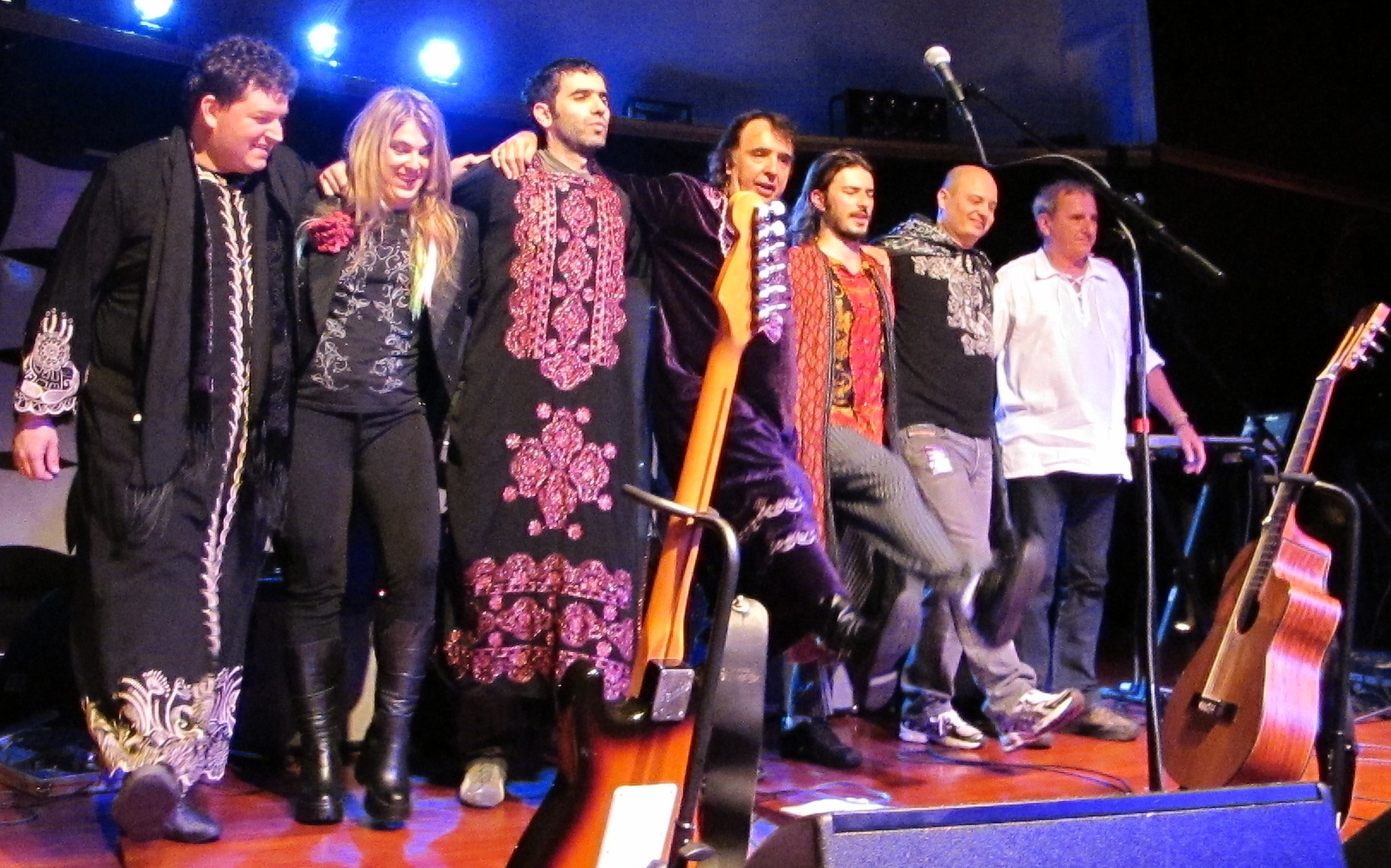
Os Mutantes in 2010.

They have also collaborated with British DJ JD Twitch, in a Britain/Brazil culture project in 2007, called Trocabrahma. In September 2007, both Arnaldo Baptista and Zélia Duncan left the band. Both expressed wishes to continue with their respective solo projects. Sérgio Dias, however, vowed to keep the reformed band alive, not wanting to let "the giant sleep again", as he put it.

In November, it was reported that Liminha would return to the fold, while Karina Zeviani was said to replace Duncan as the band's female vocalist. Neither is part of the new band lineup. Sérgio Dias announced in late 2007 the recording of a new studio album, with some collaboration by Tom Zé and Devendra Banhart. In April 2008, Os Mutantes released their first song in more than 30 years, called "Mutantes Depois", with new female vocalist Bia Mendes and male vocalist Fabio Recco, available for digital download and online stream.

In June 2008, "A Minha Menina" was the featured audio track for the McDonald's commercial "Victory."

In 2009, the band announced their first new release in 35 years, Haih Or Amortecedor, which was released on 8 September, by ANTI- Records. They did an extensive North American tour in support of the album in the fall of 2009 and played at the Glastonbury Festival in June 2010. The band also toured North America in the fall of 2010.

In 2011, they collaborated with Of Montreal on the song "Bat Macumba" for the Red Hot Organization's most recent charitable album "Red Hot+Rio 2." The album is a follow-up to the 1996 "Red Hot + Rio," with proceeds from the sales donated to raise awareness and money to fight AIDS/HIV and related health and social issues.

On 30 April 2013, Fool Metal Jack was released. Unlike Haih Or Amortecedor, the album's lyrics are mostly in English. The album features a slightly different lineup than Haih, with Ani Cordero replacing Dinho Leme on drums and Amy Crawford replacing Henrique Peters on keyboards. The band toured North America in support of the album.

In 2022–2023, Os Mutantes, fronted by Sérgio Dias, went on a North American tour.

== Legacy ==
When Os Mutantes was formed, it combined influences from rock acts from the English-speaking world like The Beatles, Jimi Hendrix, Sly & the Family Stone, the Ventures, and Duane Eddy with bossa nova, tropicália, samba and the cultural legacy of the Brazilian art vanguards from the modernist movement.

Os Mutantes is one of the most well-known and influential rock bands in Brazil. In addition, many contemporary underground or independent bands in the United States and Europe cite Os Mutantes as a major influence. Kurt Cobain publicly requested a reunion tour from the trio in 1993, writing a letter to Arnaldo Baptista. Cobain was introduced to them by Pat Fear from White Flag (whose collaboration with Redd Kross and other friends under the name The Tater Totz was the first American band to cover or even cite Os Mutantes on their 1988 LP Alien Sleestaks from Brazil). Beck paid tribute to the group with his single "Tropicália" from the album Mutations. The Bees covered "A Minha Menina" on their first album, Sunshine Hit Me. Red Hot Chili Peppers bass player Flea has stated on his Twitter account that "Os Mutantes the Brazilian band is so great". Kevin Barnes of Of Montreal cites Os Mutantes as an important influence. Talking Heads frontman David Byrne has worked to publish and promote the group's music through his Luaka Bop label.

Their song Ave Lucifer has been sampled on Captain Murphy's song "The Killing Joke" (produced by Flying Lotus).

== Band members ==
=== Current members ===
- Sérgio Dias – guitar, vocals, sitar, bass, organ, cello, oud, percussion, harmonica (1966–1978; 2006–present)
- Henrique Peters – vocals, keyboards, piano, organ (2008–present)
- Vinícius Junqueira – bass, synth bass (2008–present)
- Esmeria Bulgari – vocals, percussion (2012–present)
- Cláudio Tchernev – drums, percussion (2013–present)
- Camilo Macedo – guitars (2015–present)

=== Former members ===
- Arnaldo Baptista – keyboards, vocals, bass, cello (1966–1973; 2006–2007)
- Rita Lee – vocals, percussion, keyboards, recorder, autoharp, theremin (1966–1972; died 2023)
- Cláudio César Dias Baptista – audio generation (1967–1969)
- Liminha – bass, vocals (1969–1974)
- Dinho Leme – drums, percussion (1969–1973)
- Manito – keyboards, saxophone, flute (1973)
- Rui Motta – drums, percussion (1973–1978)
- Túlio Mourão – keyboards, vocals (1973–1976)
- Antônio Pedro – bass, vocals (1974–1976)
- Paulo de Castro – bass, vocals (1976–1978)
- Fernando Gama – bass, vocals (1978)
- Zélia Duncan – vocals (2006–2007)
- Bia Mendes – vocals, percussion (2008–2012)
- Fábio Recco – vocals, piano (2008–2012)
- Ani Cordero – drums, percussion (2012–2013)
- Amy Crawford – keyboards, piano, organ (2012–2013)

== Discography ==
The discography of Os Mutantes consists of ten studio albums, two live albums, ten compilation albums, four extended plays, ten singles and one video album

=== Albums ===
==== Studio albums ====
Year	Album details
1968	Os Mutantes: Released: June 1968 (Brazil); Recorded: December 1967 – January 1968; Label: Polydor (Brazil), Omplatten (US, 1999 reissue), Universal (worldwide, 2006 reissue)
1969	Mutantes: Released: February 1969 (Brazil); Recorded: December 1968; Label: Polydor (Brazil), Omplatten (US, 1999 reissue), Universal (worldwide, 2006 reissue)
1970	A Divina Comédia ou Ando Meio Desligado: Released: March 1970 (Brazil); Recorded: October 1969; Label: Polydor (Brazil), Omplatten (US, 1999 reissue)
1971	Jardim Elétrico: Released: March 1971 (Brazil); Recorded: November 1970, early 1971; Label: Polydor
1972	Mutantes e Seus Cometas no País do Baurets: Released: May 1972 (Brazil); Recorded: October – November 1971; Label: Polydor
1974	Tudo Foi Feito Pelo Sol: Released: November 1974 (Brazil); Recorded: Mid-1974; Label: Som Livre
1992	O A e o Z: Released: 1992 (Brazil); Recorded: 1973; Label: Philips
2000	Tecnicolor: Released: 2000 (Brazil); Recorded: November 1970; Label: Universal Music
2009	Haih Or Amortecedor: Released: 8 September 2009 (US), 2010 (Brazil); Recorded: 2009; Label: ANTI- (US), Coqueiro Verde (Brazil)
2013	Fool Metal Jack: Released: 30 April 2013 (US); Recorded: 2012; Label: Krian Music Group
2020	Zzyzx: Released: 24 January 2020 (Brazil); Recorded: 2019; Label: Gravadora Jardim Elétrico

==== Live albums ====
Year	Album details
1976	Mutantes Ao Vivo: Released: 1976 (Brazil); Recorded: August 1976; Label: Som Livre
2006	Mutantes Ao Vivo – Barbican Theatre, Londres 2006: Released: 27 November 2006 (Brazil), 2007 (US/UK); Recorded: 22 May 2006; Label: Sony BMG (Brazil), Luaka Bop (US/UK)

==== Compilation albums ====
Year	Album details
1986	Algo Mais: Released: 1986 (Brazil); Recorded: 1967–1971; Label: Philips
1994	Personalidade: Mutantes: Released: 1994 (Brazil); Recorded: 1967–1971; Label: Polydor
1994	Minha História: Mutantes: Released: 1994 (Brazil); Recorded: 1967–1973; Label: Polydor
1996	Coleção Obras-Primas: Mutantes: Released: 1996 (Brazil); Recorded: 1967–1973; Label: Polydor
1997	Os Grandes da MPB: Os Mutantes: Released: 1997 (Brazil); Recorded: 1967–1971; Label: Edições del Prado/PolyGram
1998	Millenium: Os Mutantes: Released: 1998 (Brazil); Recorded: 1967–1973; Label: PolyGram; Reissued in 2005 as Novo Millenium: Os Mutantes (Universal Music)
1999	Everything Is Possible: The Best of Os Mutantes: Released: 1999 (US); Recorded: 1967–1971; Label: Luaka Bop
2006	A Arte de Os Mutantes: Released: 2006 (Brazil); Recorded: 1967–1973; Label: Universal Music; Reissued in 2015 with different artwork
2006	De Volta Ao Planeta Dos Mutantes: Released: 2006 (Brazil); Recorded: 1967–1973; Label: Universal Music
2015	Mande Um Abraço Pra Velha: Released: 2015 (Brazil); Recorded: 1967–1972; Label: Polysom

==== EPs ====
Year	Album details
1968	Caetano Veloso & Os Mutantes Ao Vivo (live with Caetano Veloso): Released: 1968 (Brazil); Label: Philips; Track listing: A1. A Voz Do Morto; A2. Baby; B1. Marcianita; B2. Saudosismo
1969	Mutantes No. 1: Released: September 1969 (Brazil); Label: Polydor; Track Listing: A1. Fuga No. II; A2. Adeus, Maria Fulô; B1. Dois Mil e Um; B2. Bat Macumba
1970	A Divina Comédia Ou Ando Meio Desligado (selections from the LP): Released: June 1970 (Brazil); Label: Polydor; Track Listing: A1. Hey Boy; A2. Desculpe, Babe; B1. Ando Meio Desligado; B2. Preciso Urgentemente Encontrar um Amigo
1975	Mutantes: Released: 1975 (Brazil); Label: Som Livre; Track Listing: A1. Cavaleiros Negros; B1. Tudo Bem; B2. Balada do Amigo

=== Box sets ===
Year	Title	Album details
2014	Os Mutantes	Label: Universal Music; Includes the albums: Os Mutantes; Mutantes; A Divina Comédia Ou Ando Meio Desligado; Jardim Elétrico; Mutantes e Seus Cometas no País do Baurets; Tecnicolor; Mande Um Abraço Pra Velha

=== Singles ===
Year	Single	Album	Label
1966	"Suicida" / "Apocalipse"	Non-album single (As O'Seis)	Continental (Brazil)
1968	"A Minha Menina" / "Adeus, Maria Fulô"	Os Mutantes	Polydor (Brazil)
1968	"É Proibido Proibir" / "Ambiente de Festival (É Proibido Proibir)"	Non-album single (with Caetano Veloso)	Philips (Brazil)
1968	"Caminhante Noturno"	Mutantes (A-side is a non-Os Mutantes track from group MPB-4)	Philips (Brazil)
1969	"Caminhante Noturno" / "Baby"	Mutantes/Os Mutantes	Polydor (France)
1969	"Dois Mil e Um" / "Dom Quixote"	Mutantes	Polydor (Brazil)
1969	"Ando Meio Desligado" / "Não Vá Se Perder Por Aí"	A Divina Comédia Ou Ando Meio Desligado/Mutantes	Polydor (Brazil)
1971	"Top Top" / "It's Very Nice Pra Xuxu"	Jardim Elétrico	Polydor (Brazil)
1972	"Mande Um Abraço Pra Velha"	Non-album single (B-side is a non-Os Mutantes track from singer Fabio)	Polydor (Brazil)
2008	"Mutantes Depois"	Non-album single	Digital release
2015	"Esos Ojos verdes"	Non-album single	Digital release

=== Videos ===
Year	Video Details	Note
2006	Mutantes Ao Vivo – Barbican Theatre, Londres 2006	DVD release

=== Other recordings featuring Os Mutantes ===
Year	Artist	Album/Single	Format	Label	Notes
1966	Gemini II	"Lindo (Groovin')" / "Tchau Mug"	Single	Continental	O'Seis as backing vocalists
1967	Nana Caymmi	"Bom Dia"	Single	RGE	Backing band
1967	Ronnie Von	Ronnie Von Nº 3	LP	Polydor	Backing band in 8 tracks
1967	Gilberto Gil	Gilberto Gil	LP	Philips	Backing band in 8 tracks
1968	Caetano Veloso	Caetano Veloso	LP	Philips	Backing band in the track "Eles"
1968	Various	Tropicalia ou Panis et Circenses	LP	Philips	Features the Mutantes track "Panis et Circenses" plus other 4 tracks with the group as a backing band
1968	Rogério Duprat	A Banda Tropicalista do Duprat	LP	Philips	Backing band in 4 tracks
1968	Various	II Festival Estudantil da Música Popular Brasileira	LP	Philips	Features the Mutantes non-album track "Glória ao Rei dos Confins do Além"
1968	Gilberto Gil	"A Luta Contra a Lata ou a Falência do Café"	Single	Philips	Backing band
1969	Various	IV Festival Internacional da Canção Popular	LP	Philips	Features a live version of "Ando Meio Desligado"
1970	Rita Lee	Build Up	LP	Polydor	Arnaldo Baptista as musical director, songwriter and performer
1972	Rita Lee	Hoje É o Primeiro Dia do Resto da Sua Vida	LP	Polydor	A Mutantes de facto album credited to solo Rita Lee
1974	Arnaldo Baptista	Lóki?	LP	Philips	With Rita Lee (backing vocals), Liminha (bass) and Dinho Leme (drums)
