= Rogério Duprat =

Brazilian composer and musician

- Born: 7 February 1932
- Died: 26 October 2006 (aged 74)
- Genres: Tropicália
- Occupation: Composer

Rogério Duprat (7 February 1932 – 26 October 2006) was a Brazilian composer and musician.

== Biography ==
Born in Rio de Janeiro, Duprat spent much of his life in São Paulo, where he died. It was there in the early 1960s that he developed an interest in the avant-garde art and music that would soon lead to him studying in Europe with Karlheinz Stockhausen and Pierre Boulez.

Returning to Brazil, Duprat wrote scores for Walter Hugo Khouri's films. Against the background of military dictatorship, Duprat met the leaders of Tropicália: Caetano Veloso and Gilberto Gil. He found himself instantly drawn to the movement by their determination to absorb universal culture and revolutionize Brazilian music.

He wrote most of the arrangements of tropicália albums by Caetano Veloso, Gilberto Gil, Tom Zé, Gal Costa, Os Mutantes, including the album Tropicália ou Panis et Circenses. He also made arrangements for other artists, such as Chico Buarque, Alceu Valença, Geraldo Azevedo, Nara Leao and Guilherme Arantes.

Duprat's arrangements received much praise over the years, and he became known as the "George Martin of Tropicalia" and the "Brian Wilson of Brazil".

Rogério Duprat's solo LP A Banda Tropicalista do Duprat was released in 1968 when his popularity and output was at its peak. Duprat fused the two popular musical tastes of 1960s São Paulo: psychedelia and classical.

In later years, Duprat spent time writing jingles but was slowly forced to withdraw from his artistic activities due to hearing problems. He retired to a farmhouse in the São Paulo countryside. He left two sons and a daughter, Rudá Duprat, Roatã Duprat and Rai Duprat. His son Roatã is a musician too, bassist at Cabeça Boca and his grandson Bruno Duprat is also a musician, composer and performer at Love TAP.
