= Sérgio Dias =

Brazilian musician

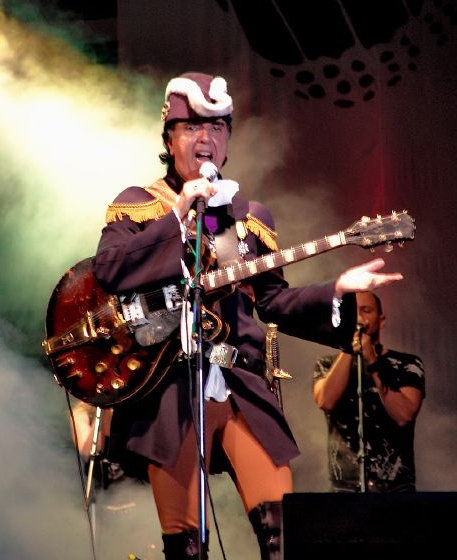
- Dias in 2007

Background information
- Born: Sérgio Dias Baptista; December 1, 1950 (age 75); São Paulo, Brazil
- Genres: Psychedelic rock, progressive rock, tropicalismo, experimental

Sérgio Dias Baptista (born December 1, 1950) is a Brazilian rock musician, composer and guitar player. Twice a Latin Grammy nominee, he is best known for his work with the band Os Mutantes and has been the only consistent member of the band, appearing on every album since its formation. In 2010 Sergio Dias collaborated with the band Tahiti Boy and the Palmtree Family in a project called "We are the Lilies", which also featured contributions from Iggy Pop and Jane Birkin.

== Discography ==
With Os Mutantes

Solo, soundtrack and collaborations

- 1980: Sérgio Dias, CBS (Brazil)
- 1988: Johnny Love - OST, SBK (Brazil)
- 1990: Mato Grosso (with Phil Manzanera), Expression Records (UK)
- 1991: Mind Over Matter, Expression Records (UK)
- 1997: Song of the Leopard, Black Sun Records (USA)
- 2000: Estação da Luz, Lotus Music (Brazil)
- 2003: Jazz Mania Live (recorded in 1986), Editio Princeps (Brazil)
- 2011: We Are The Lilies (with Tahiti Boy & The Palmtree Family), Third Side Records, (UK)

== See also ==
- Tropicália
