= Beat Acelerado =

Single by Metrô

from the album Olhar
- B-side: "Sândalo de Dândi"
- Released: 1984
- Recorded: 1984
- Genre: New wave, synth-pop, synth-rock
- Length: 3:46
- Label: Epic Records
- Songwriter(s): Alec Haiat, Vicente França, Yann Laouenan, Metrô ("Beat Acelerado"); Tavinho Paes ("Sândalo de Dândi")
- Producer(s): Luiz Carlos Maluly

Metrô singles chronology
"Beat Acelerado" (1984)	"Ti Ti Ti" (1985)

"Beat Acelerado" (Portuguese for "Fast Beat") is a single by Brazilian band Metrô, released in 1984 by Epic Records. The lead single for their debut studio album Olhar, which would come out in the following year, it was the band's first official release under the name "Metrô" (they were known as A Gota Suspensa from their foundation in 1978 until 1984) and their first of many releases under the Epic label. The song was a huge hit, and was responsible for catapulting the band into fame. A music video for it was made in the same year.

Metrô has made two re-recordings of the song during its lifespan: the first re-recording, subtitled "2nd Version", is a much shorter (only 1:11 minutes long) and slower edit of the song, and was included in Olhar. The second one was made for their 2002 album Déjà-Vu, and is a bossa nova-inflected version of the song. A remix of the song by DJ Zé Pedro was subsequently included on the 2016 re-release of Olhar as a bonus track.

Brazilian singer and TV presenter Angélica has covered the song in her seventh, self-titled studio album, released in 1994.

== Track listing ==
1. Beat Acelerado – 3:46
2. Sândalo de Dândi – 3:53

== Personnel ==
- Virginie Boutaud – vocals
- Daniel "Dany" Roland – drums
- Xavier Leblanc – bass
- Yann Laouenan – keyboards
- Alec Haiat – guitar
- Luiz Carlos Maluly – production
