= Rita Lee singles discography =

Singles by Brazilian singer

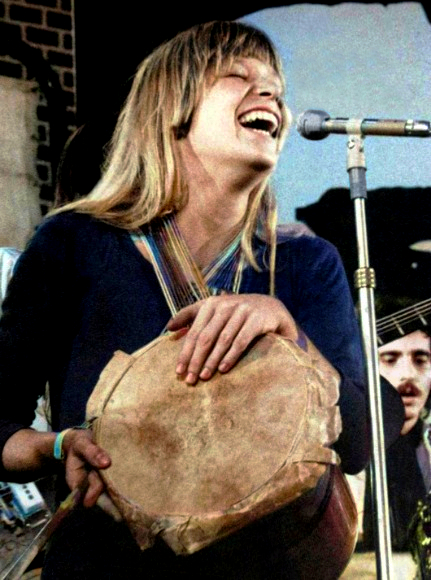
- Lee in 1972
- Singles: 33
- Promotional singles: 34
- Other appearances: 18

Brazilian singer-songwriter Rita Lee (31 December 1947 – 8 May 2023) released 33 singles and 34 promotional singles and appeared on 17 other projects. Among those releases, three topped the official chart in at least one international market, including France, Spain, and Portugal. On Brazilian radio airplay charts, her song "Arrombou a Festa" entered the list of the 100 most-played tracks during the 1970s. In the 1980s, Lee stood out as one of the seven most-played artists in the country—alongside Gal Costa, the only female acts on the list—landing "Baila Comigo", "Banho de Espuma", "Saúde", and "Lança Perfume", in that order, among the 100 most-played of that decade. Lee holds the record for the most appearances on Brazilian telenovela soundtracks in history, with nearly 100 inclusions, 15 of which served as opening themes.

In 1970, Lee launched her solo career by signing with record label Polydor and releasing the album Build Up. Her debut solo single, "José (Joseph)", peaked at number nine among best-selling singles in Rio de Janeiro according to data from the Brazilian Institute of Public Opinion and Statistics (IBOPE), while finishing as the eighth best-selling release of the year on the NOPEM chart. Her 1976 single "Arrombou a Festa" peaked at number two in Brazil and finished the year at number 13 on the NOPEM list, with estimated sales of 250,000 copies. "Mania de Você" (1979) achieved massive nationwide success after being featured in an Ellus commercial, ranking third among the most popular songs in São Paulo.

In the 1980s, Lee established major chart successes in international markets: "Lança Perfume", from Rita Lee (1980), topped the French chart, reached the top three in Argentina and Uruguay, and entered the charts in Spain and on the US Billboard Disco Top 80, becoming the most popular Brazilian song of 1980. Her subsequent single "Baila Conmigo", from the international album Baila Conmigo (1983), reached number one in Spain and number four in Argentina. "Tatibitati" (1981) reached number 51 in France, while "Sassaricando" (1987) topped the chart in Portugal and peaked at number 92 on the Music & Media Eurochart Hot 100. Later, "Amor e Sexo", released as the lead single from Balacobaco (2003), reached number three on Brazilian radio. In 2026, "Reza", from Reza (2012), was certified gold by Pro-Música Brasil.

== Singles ==
| Title | Year | Peak chart positions | | | | | | | | | Sales | Certifications | Album |
| Title | Year | BRA | POR | ARG | SPA | URU | FRA | GER | EU | US Disco | Sales | Certifications | Album |
|---|---|---|---|---|---|---|---|---|---|---|---|---|---|
| "José (Joseph)" | 1970 | — (Note: "José (Joseph)" peaked on the Rio de Janeiro best-selling singles chart at number nine, according to IBOPE.) | — | — | — | — | — | — | — | — | | | Build Up |
| "Ovelha Negra" | 1976 | — | — | — | — | — | — | — | — | — | | | Fruto Proibido |
| "Arrombou a Festa" | 1976 | 2 | — | — | — | — | — | — | — | — | BRA: 250,000 | | Non-album single |
| "Mania de Você" | 1979 | — (Note: "Mania de Você" peaked on the São Paulo most popular songs chart at number three, according to Rádio América.) | — | — | — | — | — | — | — | — | | | Rita Lee (Mania de Você) |
| "Corre-Corre" | 1979 | — | — | — | — | — | — | — | — | — | | | Rita Lee (Mania de Você) |
| "Chega Mais" | 1979 | — | — | — | — | — | — | — | — | — | | | Rita Lee (Mania de Você) |
| "Maria Mole" | 1979 | — | — | — | — | — | — | — | — | — | | | Rita Lee (Mania de Você) |
| "Lança Perfume" | 1980 | — (Note: "Lança Perfume" peaked on the São Paulo most popular songs chart at number three, according to Rádio América.) | — | 2 | 27 | 3 | 1 | 3 | — | 70 | WW: 800,000; FRA: 250,000; ARG: 200,000 | | Rita Lee (Lança Perfume) |
| "Baila Comigo" | 1981 | — | — | — | — | — | — | — | — | — | | | Rita Lee (Lança Perfume) |
| "Nem Luxo, Nem Lixo" | 1981 | — | — | — | — | — | — | — | — | — | | | Rita Lee (Lança Perfume) |
| "Caso Sério" | 1981 | — | — | — | — | — | — | — | — | — | | | Rita Lee (Lança Perfume) |
| "Banho de Espuma" | 1982 | — | — | — | — | — | — | — | — | — | | | Saúde |
| "Atlântida" | 1982 | — | — | — | — | — | — | — | — | — | | | Saúde |
| "Mutante" | 1982 | — | — | — | — | — | — | — | — | — | | | Saúde |
| "Favorita" | 1982 | — | — | — | — | — | — | — | — | — | | | Saúde |
| "Tatibitati" | 1982 | — | — | — | — | — | 51 | — | — | — | | | Saúde |
| "Flagra" | 1982 | — | — | — | — | — | — | — | — | — | | | Rita Lee & Roberto de Carvalho (Flagra) |
| "Barriga da Mamãe" | 1983 | — | — | — | — | — | — | — | — | — | | | Rita Lee & Roberto de Carvalho (Flagra) |
| "Frou-Frou" | 1983 | — | — | — | — | — | — | — | — | — | | | Rita Lee & Roberto de Carvalho (Flagra) |
| "Baila Conmigo" | 1983 | — | — | 4 | 1 | — | — | — | — | — | | | Baila Conmigo |
| "Baño de Espuma" | 1983 | — | — | — | — | — | — | — | — | — | | | Baila Conmigo |
| "Desculpe o Auê" | 1983 | — | — | — | — | — | — | — | — | — | | | Bombom |
| "Pega Rapaz" | 1987 | — | — | — | — | — | — | — | — | — | | | Flerte Fatal |
| "Sassaricando" | 1987 | — | 1 | — | — | — | — | — | 92 | — | | | Sassaricando (Soundtrack) |
| "Perto do Fogo" | 1990 | — | — | — | — | — | — | — | — | — | | | Rita Lee & Roberto de Carvalho (Perto do Fogo) |
| "Agora Só Falta Você (ao Vivo)" | 1998 | — | — | — | — | — | — | — | — | — | | | Acústico MTV: Rita Lee |
| "Erva Venenosa" | 2000 | — | — | — | — | — | — | — | — | — | | | 3001 |
| "Pra Você Eu Digo Sim" | 2001 | — | — | — | — | — | — | — | — | — | | | Bossa 'n Beatles (Aqui, Ali, em Qualquer Lugar) |
| "Amor e Sexo" | 2003 | 3 | — | — | — | — | — | — | — | — | | | Balacobaco |
| "Reza" | 2012 | — | — | — | — | — | — | — | — | — | | PMB: Gold | Reza |
| "Tô um Lixo" | 2012 | — | — | — | — | — | — | — | — | — | | | Reza |
| "Change" | 2021 | — | — | — | — | — | — | — | — | — | | | Non-album single |
| "Voando (Nel Blu Dipinto Di Blu)" | 2024 | — | — | — | — | — | — | — | — | — | | | Non-album single |

== Promotional singles ==
| Title | Year | Album |
|---|---|---|
| "Corista de Rock" | 1976 | Entradas e Bandeiras |
| "Esse Tal de Roque Enrow" | 1977 | Fruto Proibido |
| "Bem-Me-Quer" | 1981 | Rita Lee (Lança Perfume) |
| "Saúde" | 1982 | Saúde |
| "Vote em Mim" | 1982 | Rita Lee & Roberto de Carvalho (Flagra) |
| "Pirata Cigano" | 1982 | Rita Lee & Roberto de Carvalho (Flagra) |
| "Barata Tonta" | 1982 | Rita Lee & Roberto de Carvalho (Flagra) |
| "Cor-de-Rosa Choque" | 1983 | Rita Lee & Roberto de Carvalho (Flagra) |
| "Só de Você" | 1983 | Rita Lee & Roberto de Carvalho (Flagra) |
| "Corré-Corré" | 1983 | Baila Conmigo |
| "Dulce Vampiro" | 1983 | Baila Conmigo |
| "Manía de Tí" | 1983 | Baila Conmigo |
| "Uai, Uai" (Ney Matogrosso featuring Rita Lee) | 1983 | Mato Grosso |
| "On the Rocks" | 1983 | Bombom |
| "Pirarucu" | 1984 | Bombom |
| "Bobos da Corte" | 1984 | Bombom |
| "Vírus do Amor" | 1985 | Rita e Roberto |
| "Pare com Isso" | 1987 | Flerte Fatal |
| "Bwana" | 1987 | Flerte Fatal |
| "Brazix Muamba" | 1987 | Flerte Fatal |
| "Xuxuzinho" | 1987 | Flerte Fatal |
| "Zona Zen" | 1988 | Zona Zen |
| "Livre Outra Vez" | 1989 | Zona Zen |
| "Independência e Vida" | 1989 | Zona Zen |
| "Sem Endereço (Rapaz do Piauí)" | 1989 | Zona Zen |
| "Nunca Fui Santa" | 1989 | Zona Zen |
| "Desculpe o Auê (ao Vivo)" | 1992 | Rita Lee em Bossa 'n Roll |
| "Every Breath You Take (ao Vivo)" | 1992 | Rita Lee em Bossa 'n Roll |
| "Fruta Madura" | 1997 | Santa Rita de Sampa |
| "Obrigado Não" | 1997 | Santa Rita de Sampa |
| "Lança Perfume (ao Vivo)" | 1998 | Acústico MTV: Rita Lee |
| "Desculpe o Auê (ao Vivo)" (featuring Paula Toller) | 1998 | Acústico MTV: Rita Lee |
| "Tudo Vira Bosta" | 2003 | Balacobaco |
| "Tento Entender" (Otto featuring Rita Lee) | 2004 | Sem Gravidade |

== Other appearances ==
| Title | Year | Other artist(s) | Album |
|---|---|---|---|
| "Fonte da Juventude" | 1977 | —N/a | Carnaval 78 Convocação Geral |
| "Jou Jou Balangandãs (ao Vivo)" | 1980 | João Gilberto | João Gilberto Prado Pereira de Oliveira |
| "Kid Supérfluo, o Consumidor Implacável" | 1984 | Arrigo Barnabé | Tubarões Voadores |
| "Chega de Mágoa" | 1985 | Various | Non-album single |
| "Merda" | 1986 | Luiz Caldas · Chico Buarque · Caetano Veloso | Melhores Momentos de Chico & Caetano |
| "A Fina Poeira do Ar" | 1989 | Paulo Ricardo | Paulo Ricardo |
| "Spirit of the Forest" | 1989 | Various | Non-album single |
| "Samba do Arnesto" | 1990 | —N/a | Adoniran Barbosa: O Poeta do Bexiga |
| "O Que é Que a Baiana Tem?" | 1994 | —N/a | Dorival |
| "Zumbi (Lembranças do Dia)" | 1994 | Golpe de Estado | Zumbi |
| "O Menino Maluquinho" | 1996 | Milton Nascimento | A Festa do Menino Maluquinho: O Disco |
| "Televisão (ao Vivo)" | 1997 | Titãs | Acústico MTV: Titãs |
| "Mania de Você (ao Vivo)" | 2002 | Gal Costa | Duetos |
| "Coisas da Vida" | 2009 | Wanessa Camargo | Meu Momento |
| "Ti-Ti-Ti" | 2010 | —N/a | Ti Ti Ti: Volume 1 |
| "Purabossanova" | 2013 | Sérgio Britto | Purabossanova |
| "Papai Me Empresta o Carro / Parei na Contramão / Flagra / Splish Splash / Mania de Você / Cama e Mesa / Baila Comigo / Garota do Roberto / É Papo Firme (ao Vivo)" | 2014 | Roberto Carlos | Duetos 2 |
| "Amarelo, Azul e Branco" | 2021 | Anavitória | Cor |

== See also ==
- Rita Lee albums discography
- List of artists who reached number one on the French Singles Chart
- List of artists who reached number one on the Spanish Singles Chart
