= Déjà-Vu (Metrô album) =

Studio album by Metrô
- Released: 2002
- Recorded: 2002
- Genre: Synth-pop, MPB, bossa nova, jazz, lounge music
- Label: Trama
- Producer: Dany Roland, Yann Laouenan

Metrô chronology
A Mão de Mao (1987)	Déjà-Vu (2002)

Virginie Boutaud chronology
Crime Perfeito (1988)	Déjà-Vu (2002)

Professional ratings
Review scores
Source	Rating
Omelete	link

Déjà-Vu is the third and currently last studio album by Brazilian band Metrô, released in 2002 by independent label Trama. Their first album of new material in 15 years after they first broke up, it reunited them with former vocalist Virginie Boutaud, who had been fired from the band in 1986. Original guitarist Alec Haiat decided not to partake in the band's reunion though due to his involvement with other projects at the time and other personal reasons, and so was replaced by André Fonseca. Xavier Leblanc, who was also very busy with his then-newly founded French bistro, La Tartine, only acted as a session member on the tracks "Achei Bonito" and "Johnny Love", being subsequently replaced by Pedro Albuquerque until the band separated again in 2004.

Contrasting with the new wave sound the band had developed during its heyday in the mid-1980s, Déjà-Vu heads toward a much slower direction influenced by jazz and traditional Brazilian genres such as samba, bossa nova and MPB, and contains numerous covers of popular singers of such genres like Caetano Veloso, Jorge Ben Jor, Ary Barroso, Jair Rodrigues and Ataulfo Alves. Re-recordings of some of their hits from the 1980s ("Sândalo de Dândi", "Johnny Love" and "Beat Acelerado") are also included.

The album counts with many guest musicians, such as Waly Salomão (in one of his last credited works prior to his death one year after the album's release), Preta Gil, Otto, Lucas Santtana, Jorge Mautner and Nélson Jacobina. Remixes of four of the album's tracks by different DJs are included as bonus tracks.

Music videos were made for the tracks "Resemblances", "Mensagem de Amor" and "Achei Bonito"; all three were directed by producer Dany Roland's wife, filmmaker Bia Lessa.

== Critical reception ==
Writing for Omelete, Alexandre Nagado gave the album 3 out of 5 stars, calling it "pleasant" – however, he also stated that "rockers might not enjoy the [album's] repertoire due to its MPB-influenced sonority".

== Track listing ==
No.	Title	Lyrics	Music	English title	Length
1.	"Mensagem de Amor" (Os Paralamas do Sucesso cover)	Herbert Vianna	Herbert Vianna	Love Message	4:44
2.	"Achei Bonito"	Traditional	Arr. by Dany Roland, Virginie Boutaud, Xavier Leblanc, Yann Laouenan	I Think It's Beautiful	3:13
3.	"Que Nêga É Essa?" (Jorge Ben Jor cover; feat. Preta Gil)	Jorge Ben Jor	Jorge Ben Jor	Who's That Black Girl?	4:23
4.	"Coração Vagabundo" (Caetano Veloso cover)	Caetano Veloso	Caetano Veloso	Wandering Heart	3:12
5.	"Aquarela do Brasil" (Ary Barroso cover; feat. Preta Gil)	Ary Barroso	Ary Barroso	Aquarelle of Brazil	4:30
6.	"Johnny Love"	Alec Haiat, Joe Euthanazia, Yann Laouenan	Alec Haiat, Yann Laouenan		4:16
7.	"Resemblances" (Arto Lindsay cover)	Arto Lindsay	Andres Levin, Arto Lindsay, Melvin Gibbs		5:15
8.	"Missing You"	Yann Laouenan	Yann Laouenan		3:44
9.	"Rapaz da Moda" (Jair Rodrigues cover)	Evaldo Gouveia, Jair Amorim	Evaldo Gouveia, Jair Amorim	Fashion Boy	3:43
10.	"Everyone's Wrong but Me" (Ella Fitzgerald cover)	Sammy Cahn, Saul Chaplin	Sammy Cahn, Saul Chaplin		0:59
11.	"Beat Acelerado"	Alec Haiat, Vicente França, Yann Laouenan	Vicente França, Yann Laouenan	Fast Beat	4:36
12.	"Sândalo de Dândi"	Tavinho Paes	Alec Haiat, Yann Laouenan	Dandy's Sandalwood	4:12
13.	"Leva Meu Samba" (Ataulfo Alves cover; feat. Jorge Mautner)	Ataulfo Alves	Ataulfo Alves	Take My Samba Away	2:53
14.	"Silence" (Charlie Haden cover)	Instrumental	Charlie Haden		5:37
15.	"Déjà-Vu" (feat. Otto and Waly Salomão)	Dany Roland, Yann Laouenan	Dany Roland, Yann Laouenan		5:53

Bonus tracks
No.	Title	Length
16.	"Coração Vagabundo" (remix by DJ Vu and Maga Bo)	3:04
17.	"Beat Acelerado" (remix by Bruno LT and Gustavo Garcia)	4:16
18.	"Achei Bonito" (remix by DJ Vu)	4:54
19.	"Déjà-Vu" (remix by Apollo 9)	5:00

== Personnel ==
- Virginie Boutaud – vocals
- Daniel "Dany" Roland – ambience, drums, production
- Yann Laouenan – keyboards, production
- André Fonseca – acoustic and electric guitar
- Bruno LT – DJ loops
- Pedro Albuquerque – acoustic bass
- Preta Gil – additional vocals (tracks 3 and 5)
- Lucas Santtana – acoustic guitar
- Jorge Mautner – violin, additional vocals (track 13)
- Otto – vocals (track 15)
- Waly Salomão – vocals (track 15)
- Nélson Jacobina – acoustic guitar
- Xavier Leblanc – bass guitar (tracks 2 and 6)
- Thiago Queiroz – baritone and alto saxophone
- Pedro Paulo Júnior – trumpet
- Alexandre Fonseca – tabla
- Apollo 9 – remixing
