= Ti Ti Ti (song) =

Single by Metrô

from the album Olhar
- B-side: "Tudo Pode Mudar"
- Released: 1985
- Recorded: 1984/1985
- Genre: New wave, synth-pop, synth-rock
- Length: 2:57
- Label: Epic Records
- Songwriters: Rita Lee, Roberto de Carvalho ("Ti Ti Ti"); Joe Euthanazia, Ronaldo Santos ("Tudo Pode Mudar")
- Producer: Luiz Carlos Maluly

Metrô singles chronology
"Beat Acelerado" (1984)	"Ti Ti Ti" (1985)	"Não Dá pra Parar a Música" (1985)

"Ti Ti Ti" (Brazilian Portuguese slang for "Chit-Chatter") is a single by Brazilian synthpop band Metrô, released in 1985 by Epic Records. Written by Rita Lee (one of Metrô's major influences) alongside her long-time partner Roberto de Carvalho, the song was originally featured on the band's debut album Olhar, but would acquire higher fame after being included in the soundtrack of the eponymous telenovela broadcast by Rede Globo from 1985 to 1986, serving as its opening theme. A music video for it was made in the same year.

A cover of the song by Rita Lee herself would be used as the opening theme of the telenovela's 2010 remake.

A previously unreleased dance remix of the song was included as a bonus track on the 2016 re-release of Olhar.

== Track listing ==
1. "Ti Ti Ti" – 2:57
2. Tudo Pode Mudar – 3:34

== Personnel ==
- Virginie Boutaud – vocals
- Daniel "Dany" Roland – drums
- Xavier Leblanc – bass
- Yann Laouenan – keyboards
- Alec Haiat – guitar
- Luiz Carlos Maluly – production
