= Megatamainho =

Studio album by Gero Camilo
- Released: July 27, 2014
- Genres: Rock, forró, samba, reggae
- Length: 47:40
- Label: Independent
- Producers: Gero Camilo and Bactéria

Gero Camilo chronology
Canções de Invento (2008)	Megatamainho (2014)

Megatamainho is the second studio album by Brazilian musician, actor and director Gero Camilo, released in 2014. It was produced by Bactéria, former keyboardist and guitarist of Mundo Livre S/A, and it features partnerships with Luiz Caldas, Vanessa da Mata, Otto and Rubi. Camilo describes the album music as something with potency "for dance, for celebration". He also said that he didn't make an effort towards any genre, and that it comes naturally "from my relation with my taste, from receiving things without prejudice".

The album is a celebration of his 20 years living in São Paulo, which size also inspired the name of the record (which translates as "Mega Little Size") and where he met the musicians whom he collaborated with when creating the songs.

The title track speaks of borders and was inspired by a conversation Camilo had with fellow actor Caco Ciocler about the conflicts between Jews and Palestines. "Chuchuzeiro", was composed by rapper Criolo and deals with "love and lightness". Camilo said he admires Criolo's works "and the way he shows his political and human vision of poetry. Music has much to do with out roots, with forró, but without losing the critical tone".

== Track listing ==
All music is composed by Gero Camilo, except where noted

No.	Title	Length
1.	"Catarina"	3:32
2.	"Meu Diadorim" (My Diadorim; featuring Luiz Caldas)	4:37
3.	"A Mensagem" (The Message)	4:06
4.	"Amor em Ode ao Sol" (Love in Ode to the Sun; composed by Cristiano Karnas and Luís Miranda)	3:28
5.	"Infinito Meu" (Infinite of Mine)	4:04
6.	"Eboé"	2:57
7.	"Cordel em Desacordo" (Cordl in discordance, featuring Vanessa da Mata)	4:20
8.	"Elixir de Caum" (Caum's Elixir)	3:19
9.	"Chuchuzeiro" (Chayote vine; music by Criolo)	4:07
10.	"O Amor a Fonte a Poesia" (The Love the Fountain the Poetry; featuring Otto)	4:14
11.	"Megatamainho" (Mega Little Size)	5:02
12.	"This Is Love"	3:54
Total length:		47:40

== Personnel ==
Musicians

- Gero Camilo - vocals
- Estevan Sinkovitz - guitar
- Djalma Rodrigues - guitar
- Bruno Freire - guitar
- Clayton Barros - acoustic guitar and twelve-string viola
- Jô do Vale - Rhodes
- João Carlos (João do Cello) - cello
- Livia Mattos - accordion
- Hugo Carranca - drums
- Toca Ogan - percussions
- Marcos Axé - percussion
- Malê - percussion
- Nino Silva - percussion
- Orquídeas do Brasil (former backing band for Itamar Assumpção)
- Rumbada (female percussion group)

Production

- Gero Camilo - production
- Bactéria - musical production
- Zé Cafofinho - arrangements
