= Olhar =

Studio album by Metrô
- Released: 1985
- Recorded: 1984/1985
- Genre: New wave, synth-pop, synth-rock
- Length: 41:00
- Label: Epic Records (original); Warner Music Group (2016 re-issue)
- Producer: Luiz Carlos Maluly

Metrô chronology
Olhar (1985)	A Mão de Mao (1987)

Virginie Boutaud chronology
A Gota Suspensa (1983)	Olhar (1985)	Crime Perfeito (1988)

Singles from Olhar
- 1. "Beat Acelerado" Released: 1984; 2. "Cenas Obscenas" Released: 1985; 3. "Ti Ti Ti" Released: 1985; 4. "Tudo Pode Mudar" Released: 1985

Olhar (Portuguese for "Look") is the debut album by Brazilian band Metrô (not counting their self-titled album released as A Gota Suspensa in 1983), released in 1985 by Epic Records. A critically and commercially successful album, Olhar spawned numerous hit singles which were very popular at the time of their release and are still remembered to this day, such as "Tudo Pode Mudar", "Cenas Obscenas" (which counted with a guest appearance by Léo Jaime on guitar and backing vocals), "Johnny Love" (which was included in the soundtrack of Lael Rodrigues' 1985 film Rock Estrela, in which the whole line-up of Metrô cameod as themselves) and "Ti Ti Ti", used as the opening theme of the eponymous telenovela which ran from 1985 to 1986. A shorter version of their 1984 hit "Beat Acelerado" (subtitled "2nd Version") is also included.

The choirs in "Melodix" were provided by the new wave band Degradée, in which Metrô's guitarist Alec Haiat's brother Freddy played in. Guilherme Isnard of Zero provided backing vocals for "Tudo Pode Mudar".

"Hawaii–Bombay" is a Portuguese-language translation/cover of the eponymous song by Spanish band Mecano. The Portuguese lyrics were provided by Fernando Naporano, of Maria Angélica Não Mora Mais Aqui fame.

According to the album's liner notes, "Johnny Love" is a tribute to French musician Johnny Hallyday.

A special 30-year anniversary re-issue of the album, containing numerous bonus tracks, came out on August 5, 2016 (after one year of delay), through Warner Music Group.

== Track listing ==
No.	Title	Lyrics	Music	English title	Length
1.	"Olhar"	Vicente França, Yann Laouenan	Vicente França, Yann Laouenan	Look	4:16
2.	"Cenas Obscenas" (feat. Léo Jaime)	Léo Jaime, Leoni	Alec Haiat, Yann Laouenan	Obscene Scenes	4:22
3.	"Johnny Love"	Alec Haiat, Joe Euthanazia, Yann Laouenan	Alec Haiat, Yann Laouenan		4:51
4.	"Sândalo de Dândi"	Tavinho Paes	Alec Haiat, Yann Laouenan	Dandy's Sandalwood	3:53
5.	"Melodix" (feat. Degradée)	Metrô	Alec Haiat		2:15
6.	"Beat Acelerado" (2nd Version)	Alec Haiat, Vicente França, Yann Laouenan	Vicente França, Yann Laouenan	Fast Beat	1:11
7.	"Tudo Pode Mudar" (feat. Guilherme Isnard)	Joe Euthanazia, Ronaldo Santos	Joe Euthanazia, Ronaldo Santos	Everything Can Change	3:34
8.	"Hawaii–Bombay" (Mecano cover)	José María Cano (adaptation by Fernando Naporano)	José María Cano		3:58
9.	"Solução"	Wagner, Metrô	Alec Haiat	Solution	2:54
10.	"Stabilo"	Ângelo Palumbo	Alec Haiat		3:20
11.	"Que Loucura!"	Yann Laouenan	Alec Haiat, Xavier Leblanc, Yann Laouenan	That's Crazy!	3:21
12.	"Ti Ti Ti"	Rita Lee, Roberto de Carvalho	Rita Lee, Roberto de Carvalho	Chit-Chatter	2:57

2016 re-issue bonus tracks
No.	Title	Length
13.	"Beat Acelerado" (original 1984 version)	3:46
14.	"Ti Ti Ti (Dance Mix)"	4:27
15.	"Johnny Love (Alternate Version)" (feat. Léo Jaime)	4:39
16.	"Beat Acelerado" (remix by DJ Zé Pedro)	3:53
17.	"Tudo Pode Mudar" (live at Cruzeiro – September 14, 1985)	5:05
18.	"Beat Acelerado" (live at Jaú – October 19, 1985)	6:44
19.	"Sândalo de Dândi" (live at Jaú – October 19, 1985)	8:42
20.	"Olhar" (live at Cornélio Procópio – October 13, 1985)	6:47
21.	"Johnny Love" (live at Recife – October 26, 1985)	7:26
22.	"Cenas Obscenas" (live at Tupã – October 18, 1985)	4:32
23.	"Stabilo" (live at Tupã – October 18, 1985)	3:18
24.	"Melodix" (live at Recife – October 26, 1985)	4:55
25.	"Tudo Pode Mudar (Demo Version)"	3:37
26.	"Sândalo de Dândi (Demo Version)"	3:00
27.	"Eu Digo Stop" (previously unreleased track; originally recorded in 1984)	3:52

== Personnel ==
- Virginie Boutaud – vocals
- Daniel "Dany" Roland – drums
- Xavier Leblanc – bass guitar
- Yann Laouenan – keyboards
- Alec Haiat – electric guitar
- Léo Jaime – electric guitar, backing vocals in "Cenas Obscenas"; electric guitar in "Johnny Love"; backing vocals and electric guitar in "Johnny Love (Alternate Version)"
- Degradée (Rogério Rego, Tom Marsh, Freddy Haiat, Salvador Rocca, Luiz Marcello) – choir in "Melodix"
- Guilherme Isnard – backing vocals in "Tudo Pode Mudar"
- Luiz Carlos Maluly – production
