= Virginie Boutaud =

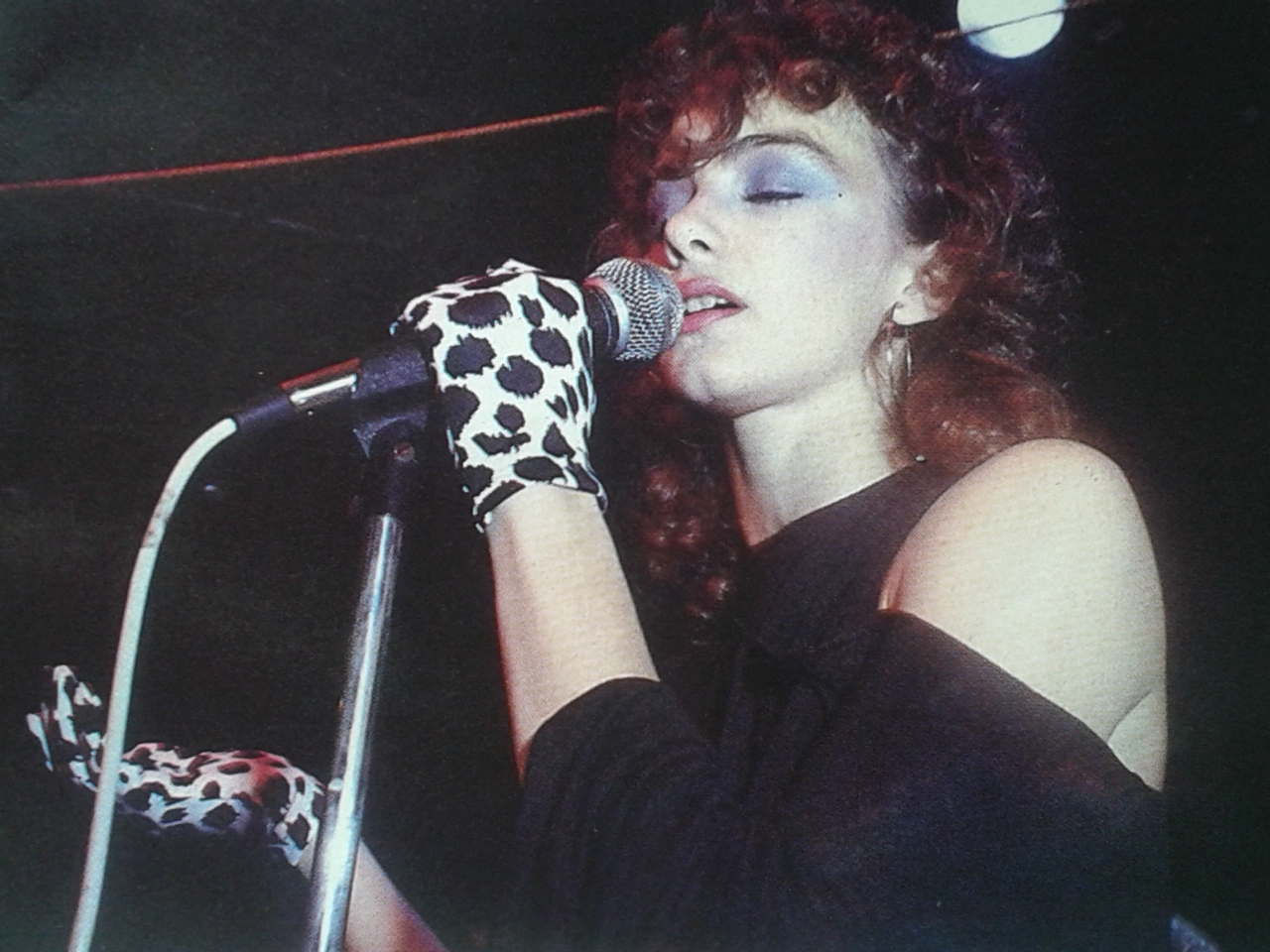
- Virginie performing with Metrô in 1985
- Born: Virginie Adèle Lydie Boutaud; February 27, 1963 (age 63); São Paulo, São Paulo, Brazil
- Occupations: Singer, songwriter, classical guitarist, ex-model, ex-actor
- Years active: 1978–1995; 2002–2004; 2014; 2015–present
- Musical career
- Genres: New wave, synth-pop, synth-rock, pop rock
- Instruments: Vocals, classical guitar
- Label: Epic Records

Virginie Adèle Lydie Boutaud-Manent (née Boutaud; born February 27, 1963), also known mononymously as Virginie, is a French Brazilian singer, songwriter, classical guitarist, and former model and actress, famous for being the vocalist of the new wave bands Metrô and Virginie & Fruto Proibido.

== Biography ==
Boutaud was born in São Paulo on February 27, 1963, to French emigrants. As a teenager she studied at the Lycée Pasteur, a school for French Brazilians, where she met Alec Haiat, Yann Laouenan, Daniel "Dany" Roland, Marcel Zimberg and Xavier Leblanc; with them she founded, in 1978, the experimental/progressive rock band A Gota Suspensa. After releasing a self-titled album in 1983, they decided to shift their musical direction towards a more accessible new wave sound inspired by Blondie, Laurie Anderson and Rita Lee, among others, and in the following year, they changed their name to Metrô. Their first release as Metrô was the single "Beat Acelerado", via Epic Records.

One year after the release of Metrô's 1985 debut album Olhar, which catapulted them into fame, numerous creative divergences between Virginie (who was fatigued due to the band's extensive touring schedule) and her bandmates made her be fired from the band. She then went to live in Paris for a while, where she took singing and dancing lessons, before returning to Brazil. Prior to her departure to France she collaborated with Kid Vinil e os Heróis do Brasil on their only, self-titled album, by providing additional vocals on the track "Assassinato Anônimo".

In 1988, the same year Metrô first disbanded, Virginie served as a guest musician on comedy rock band João Penca e Seus Miquinhos Amestrados' third album, Além da Alienação, on the track "Sem Ilusões". She also formed the short-lived solo project Virginie & Fruto Proibido alongside Don Beto (guitar), Nilton Leonardi (bass) and Albino Infantozzi (drums); their only release was the album Crime Perfeito. It was a commercial failure, and not as well-received as Virginie's previous works with Metrô; nevertheless, the track "Más Companhias" would be featured in the soundtrack of the telenovela Fera Radical, and Fruto Proibido would also share stage with Itamar Assumpção (who had already collaborated with them by writing a track of their album, "Que Tal o Impossível?") and Arrigo Barnabé. The band came to an end in 1995 – she then abandoned the musical career and found a job at the French consulate in Brazil, where she met her future husband, diplomat Jean-Michel Manent. She had with him two daughters: Marie-Hélène and Mélanie. Around this time Virginie also began to appear in commercials for BASF Magnetics and Nestlé, among others.

In 1989 Virginie made a guest appearance on gaúcho singer Joe Euthanazia's only album, simply titled Joe, providing additional vocals for the tracks "Ligação Direta" and "Uma Rajada de Balas"; Euthanazia had previously collaborated with Metrô by co-writing their 1985 hits "Johnny Love" and "Tudo Pode Mudar". In the same year she also guest-appeared on Supla's self-titled debut solo album, providing additional vocals for the track "Borboleta Rosa".

In 1999 she married Jean-Michel Manent and went on to live with him and their daughters in places such as Uruguay, Namibia and Madagascar before settling in France (initially in Nantes, then in Saint-Orens-de-Gameville, where she resides since 2013). Their marriage lasted until Manent's death due to cancer on June 7, 2015.

In 2002 Virginie reformed Metrô alongside Roland, Leblanc and Laouenan (Haiat decided not to return for personal reasons and involvement with other projects, while Leblanc only served as a session musician in a single recording), and released a new album, Déjà-Vu; it was Metrô's first album of new material since A Mão de Mao, from 1987. After a series of tours around Brazil, France, Mozambique, the UK and Portugal, Metrô came to an end once more in 2004.

The band's original line-up reunited for one night only, on November 8, 2014, for a show celebrating the 50th anniversary of the high school in which they met, the Lycée Pasteur, as well as Metrô's 30th anniversary.

Metrô's original line-up announced a new reunion in May 2015; on August 5, 2016, a 30-year anniversary re-issue of their debut Olhar came out through Warner Music Group.

Prior to focusing on her musical career, Virginie was a model (she has posed for magazines such as Vogue and Claudia) and originally planned to be an actress; she has appeared in the 1981 telenovela Os Imigrantes as Irma, and as herself in Lael Rodrigues' Rock Estrela and Francisco de Paula's Areias Escaldantes, both from 1985. She also made a brief cameo in Carla Camurati's 1995 film Carlota Joaquina, Princess of Brazil.

== Discography ==
=== With Metrô ===
Year	Album
1983	A Gota Suspensa: Label: Underground Discos e Artes; Format: Vinyl; Released as A Gota Suspensa
1985	Olhar: Label: Epic Records; Format: Vinyl, CD
2002	Déjà-Vu: Label: Trama; Format: CD

=== With Virginie and Fruto Proibido ===
Year	Album
1988	Crime Perfeito: Label: Epic Records; Format: Vinyl

=== As a session member ===
Kid Vinil e os Heróis do Brasil

- 1986: Kid Vinil e os Heróis do Brasil (additional vocals in "Assassinato Anônimo")

João Penca e Seus Miquinhos Amestrados

- 1988: Além da Alienação (additional vocals in "Sem Ilusões")

Joe Euthanazia

- 1989: Joe (additional vocals in "Ligação Direta" and "Uma Rajada de Balas")

Supla

- 1989: Supla (additional vocals in "Borboleta Rosa")
