= A Mão de Mao =

Studio album by Metrô
- Released: 1987
- Genre: Experimental rock, new wave, progressive rock
- Length: 36:56
- Label: Epic Records
- Producer: Luiz Carlos Maluly

Metrô chronology
Olhar (1985)	A Mão de Mao (1987)	Déjà-Vu (2002)

Singles from A Mão de Mao
- 1. "Gato Preto" Released: 1987; 2. "Lágrimas Imóveis" Released: 1987

A Mão de Mao (Portuguese for "Mao's Hand") is the second studio album by Brazilian band Metrô, released in 1987 by Epic Records. It was the band's only album to feature Pedro d'Orey on vocals, replacing Virginie Boutaud who was fired the year prior.

== Background ==
By 1985 Metrô was one of the most successful Brazilian bands, extensively touring and performing in numerous variety shows of the time; however, then-vocalist Virginie Boutaud was growing exhausted from the band's convoluted touring schedule, and her bandmates planned to shift from the pop-influenced style of their previous album Olhar to a more "mature" and "daring" direction influenced by Barão Vermelho, Legião Urbana and Titãs, who were some of the most influential Brazilian rock acts at the time. Numerous creative divergences and frictions led to a deterioration of the relations between Virginie and her bandmates, and she was eventually fired from the band in 1986.

Portuguese musician Pedro d'Orey, better known by his stage name Pedro Parq, was chosen as Virginie's replacement after the Metrô bandmembers listened to his work with Mler Ife Dada, of which he was one of its founding members – D'Orey recently had parted ways with the band at the time, and was living in São Paulo. With D'Orey, the band embraced a more experimental style nearly reminiscent of their earlier material as A Gota Suspensa, removing almost completely the synth-pop elements prominent in Metrô's previous album. The band initially planned to change its name from Metrô to Tristes Tigres ("Sad Tigers"), but their record label Epic did not allow them.

Despite positive reception and the moderate success of singles "Gato Preto" and "Lágrimas Imóveis", A Mão de Mao was considered a commercial failure. The band's new musical direction heavily alienated its fans, and not being able to recover their former success, Metrô split up in 1988. They endured a 15-year hiatus before reuniting with Virginie for a new album, Déjà-Vu.

The album's title is a reference to former Chinese leader Mao Zedong. According to Pedro d'Orey, he thought of the album's title after reading a recently published biography of Mao regarding his private life, and wanting to write a song thinking of him "more as a human being than as a dictator".

== Track listing ==
All lyrics are written by Pedro Parq; all music is composed by Metrô (Parq, Dany Roland, Xavier Leblanc, Yann Laouenan and Alec Haiat).

No.	Title	English title	Length
1.	"A Mão de Mao"	Mao's Hand	5:08
2.	"Habhitantes"	Inhabhitants	3:37
3.	"Cinema Branco"	White Cinema	3:45
4.	"Atlântico, 7 de Novembro"	Atlantic, November 7	3:08
5.	"Boca"	Mouth	3:56
6.	"Gato Preto"	Black Cat	3:49
7.	"Ahnimais (Wiss)"	Ahnimals (Wiss)	5:23
8.	"The Red Prayer (Idiot Love)"		3:46
9.	"Lágrimas Imóveis"	Motionless Tears	4:20

== Personnel ==
- Pedro Parq (Pedro d'Orey) – vocals
- Daniel "Dany" Roland – drums
- Xavier Leblanc – bass guitar
- Yann Laouenan – keyboards
- Alec Haiat – electric guitar
- Philippe Amey – bagpipes (track 1)
- Luiz Cláudio Faria – trumpet (tracks 4 and 5)
- Luiz Carlos Maluly – production
- Fernando Zarif – photography, cover art
