= Jullie =

Brazilian singer

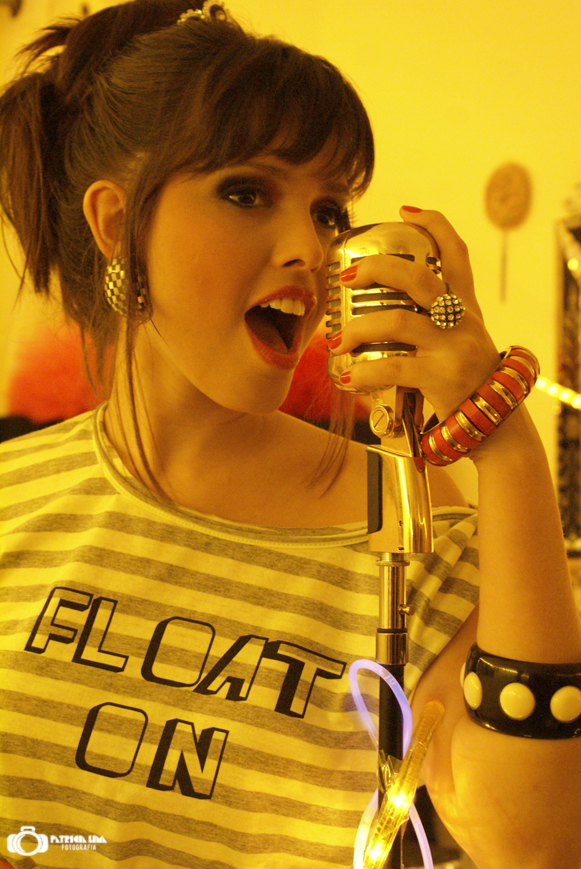

Background information
- Born: Juliana Vasconcelos Póvoas; April 16, 1988 (age 38); Vila Velha, Espírito Santo, Brazil
- Genres: Pop; pop rock; dance-pop
- Occupations: Singer; actress
- Instrument: Vocals
- Years active: 1998–present
- Label: Deckdisc
- Website: jullie.com.br

Juliana Vasconcelos Póvoas (born April 16, 1988), better known by her stage name Jullie, is a Brazilian singer and actress.

== Career ==
Born in Vila Velha, Espírito Santo, Jullie moved to São Paulo to pursue an acting career. In 1998, she appeared in television shows such as Xuxa Park, Gente Inocente and Criança Esperança. Jullie also landed her first starring role in Mais Uma Vez Amor, released in February 2005, interpreting the character Lia. In 2005 she began her career as a voice actress. Jullie lent her voice to many Brazilian versions of television series and films, including Blair Waldorf in Gossip Girl, Katie in Total Drama and Roxy in Winx Club.

Her debut album Hey!, was released on September 22, 2009, the album was influenced by singers like Lily Allen, Madonna, Alanis Morissette, and its main reference, Katy Perry, directed to a feminist position. The album was praised by the young, calling Jullie the "Brazilian Katy Perry" for her music style and way of dressing. The first single, "Alice", was released in April, and the second single, "Hey!", was released in November 2009. In February 2010, "Tudo Pode Mudar", a cover of the popular band from the 1980s Metrô, was released for the Brazilian TV series Malhação. On August 2, 2010, Julie recorded a Brazilian version of "Wouldn't Change a Thing" entitled "Eu Não Mudaria Nada em Você" with Joe Jonas for Camp Rock 2: The Final Jam soundtrack. On January 5, 2013 the musical Tudo por um pop star ('for a pop star, everything'), based on the book by Thalita Rebouças, in which she was one of the protagonists, was released.

== Discography ==
=== Albums ===
Year	Album details
2009	Hey!: Released: September 22, 2009; Label: Deckdisc; Format: CD, digital download

=== EPs ===
Year	Album details
2009	Sem Olhar Pra Trás: Released: May 12, 2009; Label: Deckdisc; Format: digital download
2013	Gasolina: Released: May 25, 2013; Label: Deckdisc; Format: digital download

=== Singles ===
Year	Single	Album
2009	"Alice"	Hey!
2009	"Hey!"	Hey!
2010	"Despertar"	Hey!
2010	"Tudo Pode Mudar"	Malhação ID soundtrack
2010	Eu Não Mudaria Nada Em Você (ft. Joe Jonas)	Camp Rock 2: The Final Jam: Soundtrack
2011	After All (ft. Felipe Guerra)	Follow Me! EP
2013	Gasolina	Gasolina EP
2013	Mais	Gasolina EP
2013	Jeans	Gasolina EP
2014	Supernova	TBA

=== Other appearances ===
Year	Song	Artist(s)	Album
2009	"Ninguém Vai Me Dizer O Que Pensar"	Strike	Meus Prêmios Nick
2010	"Aquela História"	Strike	Live Boombox
2013	"Secret Place"	Bernardo Falcone	Bradstron
2013	Os Outros	Jullie	The Voice
2013	Super Duper Love	Carina Mennitto	The Voice

=== Soundtracks ===
Year	Song	Album
2005	"Fadinha Tambelina"	Sítio do Picapau Amarelo
2009	"Latindo Pra Lua"	Bolt (Brazilian version)
2009	"Winx Club 4"	Winx Club (Brazilian version)
2009	"Hey!"	Geral.com
2010	"Tudo Pode Mudar"	Malhação
2010	"Aguenta Firme"	Good Luck Charlie (Brazilian version)
2010	"Eu Não Mudaria Nada Em Você" (feat. Joe Jonas)	Camp Rock 2: The Final Jam: Soundtrack
2011	'Coleção' feat Bernardo Falcone	Quando Toca o Sino
2011	Cada Um Faz with Cast of "Quando Toca o Sino"	Quando Toca o Sino
2011	Lá Vou Eu with Cast of "Quando Toca o Sino"	Quando Toca o Sino

== Filmography ==
=== Film ===
Year	Title	Role
2004	Mais Uma Vez Amor	Lia
2014	Minhocas	Only Voice Brazilian Stop Motion movie

=== Television ===
Year	Title	Role	Note
1999	Gente Inocente	Herself	TV show
2000	Criança Esperança	Herself	TV show
2006	Floribella	Agatha	TV series
2006	Malhação	Jane	TV series
2009	Plantão MixTV	Herself/Presenter	TV show
2010	Quando Toca o Sino	Laila	TV series
2012	Malhação	Naomi	TV series
2013	The Voice Brazil	Contestant/Herself (season 2)	Reality

=== Voiceovers ===
Year	Title	Character
2016-currently	The Fairly OddParents	Chloe Carmichael
2016–currently	The Loud House	Leni Loud
2016	Sing: Quem Canta seus Males Espanta	Becky
2016	Trolls	Princess Poppy
2014	Simplesmente Acontcece	Sally
2006	Nanaka 6/17	Kuriko Aratama
2007–2015	Phineas and Ferb	Vanessa
2007 – Currently	TV series Disney Channel	Additional Voices
2007	My Friends Tigger & Pooh	Bolota
2007	Superbad: É hoje	Nicola
2007 – Currently	Gossip Girl	Blair Waldorf
2008	Barbie e o Castelo de Diamante	Barbie/Liana Cantando
2008	Tinker Bell em Uma Aventura no Mundo das Fadas	Tinker Bell
2008	Outro Conto Da Nova Cinderela	Mary Santiago
2008	Conto do dia das bruxas	Laurie
2008	Bolt: Super Cão	Song: "Latindo Pra Lua"
2008	X-Men: Evolution	Lince Negra
2009	Os Feiticeiros de Waverly Place	Daphne
2010–2013	Numberjacks	Três
2009	Barbie em As Três Mosqueteiras	Aramina
2009	Aaron Stone	Emma
2009	Total Drama Island	Katie
2009	Os Feiticeiros de Waverly Place	Chelse
2009	Tinker bell e o Tesouro Perdido	Tinker Bell
2009	Harry Potter e o Enigma do Príncipe	Lavender Brown
2010	Total Drama Action	Katie
2010	Isa TK+	Sandra Centeno (Sandy)
2010	Os Feiticeiros de Waverly Place	Julieta Van Heusen
2010–present	Boa Sorte, Charlie!	Teddy Duncan
2010	Starstruck: meu namorado é uma superestrela	Jéssica
2010	Tiker bell e o Resgate da Fada	Tinker bell
2010	A Última Música	Veronica (singer)
2010	Winx Club	Roxy
2011	Total Drama World Tour	Katie/Bridgette(Song-Eu Lamento)
2011	Peter Punk	Johana
2011	Justiça Jovem	Artemis
2011	Rio	Jade (Song)
2011	Pânico 4	Marnie Cooper
2011	Special Agent Oso	Guia Palm
2011	Os Smurfs	Smurfette
2011	Lemonade Mouth	Olivia White
2011	Premonição 5	Candence
2011	Glee	Sugar Motta
2011	Barbie em Escola de Princesas	Makelia
2011	Tinker Bell E As Olimpiadas do Refugio das Fadas	Tinker Bell
2011	Boa Sorte Charlie, É Natal!	Teddy Duncan
2012	Tinker bell E O segredo das fadas	Tinker bell
2012	A Invenção de Hugo Cabret	Isabelle
2012	American Pie: O Reencontro	Tara
2012	A Lady e o Lobo: O Bicho tá Solto	Kate (Julieta)
2012	Um Geek Encantador	Nicole
2012	Inimigos de Infância	Savannah
2012	Jogos Vorazes	Clove
