= Crime Perfeito =

Studio album by Virginie & Fruto Proibido
- Released: 1988
- Genre: New wave, synth-pop
- Label: Epic Records
- Producer: Marco Mazzola

Virginie Boutaud chronology
Olhar (1985)	Crime Perfeito (1988)	Déjà-Vu (2002)

Crime Perfeito (Portuguese for "Perfect Crime") is the only release by Virginie & Fruto Proibido, a band fronted by Virginie Boutaud (famous for being the vocalist of new wave band Metrô) and also comprising Don Beto (guitar), Nilton Leonardi (bass) and Albino Infantozzi (drums). It was released in 1988 by Epic Records. The band was founded also in 1988, two years after Virginie was fired from Metrô due to "creative divergences", and ended in 1995 after she decided to retire from the musical business until 2002, when Metrô reformed and she was reunited with them.

Unlike Virginie's previous releases with Metrô, Crime Perfeito was a commercial failure and received mostly mixed reviews at the time of its release; however, "Más Companhias" would become a minor hit after being used in the soundtrack of the telenovela Fera Radical, which ran from March to November 1988.

"Il était une fois" is fully sung in French.

== Track listing ==
All lyrics are written by Don Beto and Virginie Boutaud, except where noted

No.	Title	Lyrics	Length
1.	"Crime Perfeito" (Perfect Crime)		4:11
2.	"Que Tal o Impossível?" (What About the Impossible?)	Itamar Assumpção	3:09
3.	"Refém" (Hostage)	Don Beto	3:22
4.	"Alucinação" (Hallucination)	Don Beto	4:16
5.	"Fruto Proibido" (Forbidden Fruit)		3:42
6.	"Arrisco Loucuras" (I Risk Follies)		3:58
7.	"Más Companhias" (Bad Companies)		3:48
8.	"Atentado" (Attack)	Don Beto, Joe Euthanazia, Virginie Boutaud	3:34
9.	"Sua Luz" (Your Light)		4:25
10.	"Il était une fois" (Once Upon a Time)	Philippe Kadosch, Virginie Boutaud	2:35

== Personnel ==
- Virginie Boutaud – vocals, classical guitar (track 10)
- Don Beto – electric guitar
- Nilton Leonardi – bass
- Albino Infantozzi – drums, percussion
- Marco Mazzola – production
