= Karine Teles =

Brazilian actress, screenwriter and filmmaker

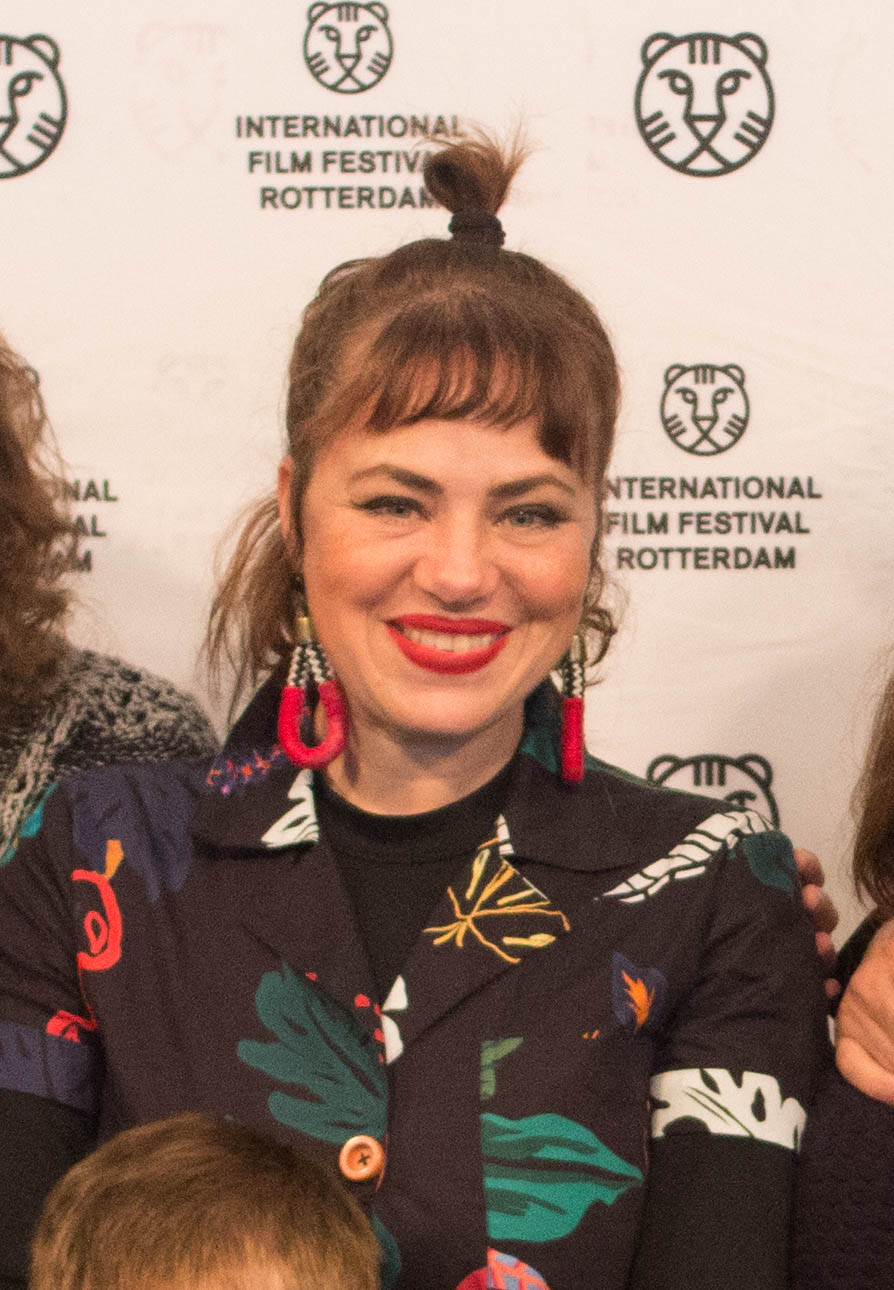
- Teles in 2018
- Born: 16 August 1978 (age 48); Petrópolis, Rio de Janeiro, Brazil
- Education: Federal University of the State of Rio de Janeiro
- Occupation: Actress
- Years active: 1993–present
- Spouse: Gustavo Pizzi (m. 2003; div. 2015)
- Children: 2

Karine Teles (born 16 August 1978) is a Brazilian actress, screenwriter, and filmmaker. She is best known for her role in The Second Mother.

== Filmography ==
=== Film ===
Year	Title	Character	Note
2002	Madame Satã		
2005	Jaz Aqui jaz a Liberdade		Short film
2009	Vida de Balconista		
2010	Riscado	Branca	
2012	Feijoada Completa	Milene	Short film
2013	O Lobo Atrás da Porta	Professora Arlete	
2014	Quinze	Raquel	Short film
2015	Que Horas Ela Volta?	Bárbara	
2015	Aspirantes	Sandra	
2017	Fala Comigo	Angela	
2018	Benzinho	Irene	
2019	Bacurau	Foreigner	
2026	On Behalf of My Son		

=== Television ===
Year	Title	Character	Note
2000	Malhação	Karen	Cameo
2009	Mateus, o Balconista	Client	Episode: "Filme de Adulto"
2013	As Canalhas	Helena	Episode: "Roberta"
2015	A Regra do Jogo	Sumara Mitta	
2016	Justiça	Cristina	Episode: "11"
2017	Filhos da Pátria	Madame Dechirré	
2017	Tempo de Amar	Odete	
2019	Malhação: Toda Forma de Amar	Regina Andrade Fonseca	
2019	Hebe	Lolita Rodrigues	
2020	Os Últimos Dias de Gilda	Gilda	
2021	Manhãs de Setembro	Leide	
2021	Sessão de Terapia	Andressa	Episode: "24"
2022	Pantanal	Madeleine Braga Novaes	Guest star
2023	Elas por Elas	Carolina "Carol"	
2023	João sem Deus - A Queda de Abadiânia	Cecília Mendonça	
2025	Vale Tudo	Aldeíde Candeias	
2025	Pablo & Luisão	Selma Santana	Episode "A Cerca Elétrica"
