= Craft (film) =

2010 film directed by Gustavo Pizzi

- Theatrical release poster
- Portuguese: Riscado
- Directed by: Gustavo Pizzi
- Written by: Gustavo Pizzi; Karine Teles
- Produced by: Cavi Borges; Gustavo Pizzi
- Starring: Karine Teles
- Cinematography: Paulo F. Camacho
- Edited by: Paulo F. Camacho; Gustavo Pizzi
- Music by: Iky Castilho; Letícia Novaes; Lucas Vasconcellos
- Release dates: September 2010 (Rio Film Festival); September 9, 2011 (Brazil)
- Running time: 85 minutes
- Country: Brazil
- Language: Portuguese

Craft (Portuguese: Riscado) is a 2010 Brazilian film directed by Gustavo Pizzi. It stars Karine Teles, who co-wrote the screenplay with Pizzi, as a stage actress who must do parallel jobs for living. This stops when she enters on an international production, in which the director decides to do a film about her life.

== Cast ==
- Karine Teles as Bianca
- Camilo Pellegrini as Mauricio
- Otávio Müller as Oscar
- Dany Roland as Thomas
- Lucas Gouvea as Filipe
- Gisele Fróes as Efignia
- Otto Jr. as Rodrigo
- Danilo Watanabe as Pedro
- Patricia Pinho
- Cecilia Hoeltz

== Production and themes ==
Gustavo Pizzi's directorial debut film, Craft uses several film stocks and formats, such as 16mm, 8mm, and high definition. Justifying it, Pizzi says that "It is like a voiceover without voice," as the different formats can "communicate" with the audience in each specific scene. The 8mm allows Pizzi to shows Bianca's most personal feelings to the viewers, for example. In another scene, however, there are the use of six cameras to film musical sequence of the in-film film.

The story is based on Karine Teles' real life experience as she was selected to appear in Rio Sex Comedy but was later replaced. On the film's theme, Pizzi stated he wanted to question how talent and luck are associated on one's career:

If someone knows their craft, [it] means that they know very well what they are doing; it is expected that this person will stand out, that this person will eventually succeed ... but how many talents are wasted ... how many people live their lives doing something that has nothing to do with their true skills? How many give up? What is necessary other than talent, work and persistence? Money? Luck? This film came from a huge desire to talk about work and opportunities, about what one has to do in order to make one’s life, dreams, projects and ideas come true. It was a personal need to understand the reason why sometimes things don’t go right, even when able and talented people are involved. Promising careers that don’t take off, talented people who remain outcast in a universe where many mediocre people thrive, having space and visibility.

== Reception ==
Upon its release, it has been well received, mostly for Teles' performance. Craft had its world premiere held at the 2010 Rio Film Festival, where Teles received the Best Actress Award. Teles won the same award at the 2011 Gramado Film Festival, where the film also garnered the Best Director, Best Screenplay and Best Music awards. At the 2011 Cartagena Film Festival, Craft was nominated for the Best Film Award. Mark Adams of ScreenDaily declared, "[Craft] may well be a familiar tale but it has a good-natured honesty as well as a series of fine performances that help make it memorable." Writing for Variety, Jay Weissberg dubbed Teles' acting as "terrific" and said, "It's been a while since a film captured an actor's world with the intelligence, creativity and insight of Craft."
