= Amália Revisited =

Compilation album by various artists
- Released: February 7, 2005
- Recorded: 2004/2005
- Genres: Electronica, downtempo, trip hop, synthpop, rock
- Label: Different World

Amália Revisited is a tribute album by various artists and bands to famous Portuguese fadista Amália Rodrigues. It was released on February 7, 2005 by Different World.

Metrô is the only Brazilian band to take part on the album; all the other artists hail from Portugal.

== Track listing ==
No.	Title	Artist	Length
1.	"Cansaço"	Bulllet feat. Liana	5:24
2.	"Sabe-se Lá"	Alex FX feat. Marta Bernardes	5:08
3.	"Flor de Lua"	Cool Hipnoise	4:59
4.	"Havemos de Ir a Viana"	Fusionlab feat. Kalaf	4:12
5.	"Êthos"	Sam the Kid	2:06
6.	"Vou Dar de Beber à Dor"	Ka§par feat. Rui Murka	5:43
7.	"Medo (Susto)"	João Pedro Coimbra feat. Ana Deus	3:56
8.	"Foi Deus"	Donna Maria	5:01
9.	"Estranha Forma de Vida"	Lisbon City Rockers feat. Margarida Pinto	5:50
10.	"Barco Negro"	Mr. Tea feat. Orlanda Guilande	3:55
11.	"Povo que Lavas no Rio"	JC Loops feat. Ana Laíns	5:06
12.	"Lágrima"	Yoda feat. Ana Vieira	3:56
13.	"Amália"	Maria João Branco	4:04
14.	"Meu Amor, Meu Amor"	Metrô	3:55
15.	"N'Canhunhô"	KaNdoo	4:11
