= Gero Camilo =

Brazilian actor, dramatist, singer-songwriter, poet

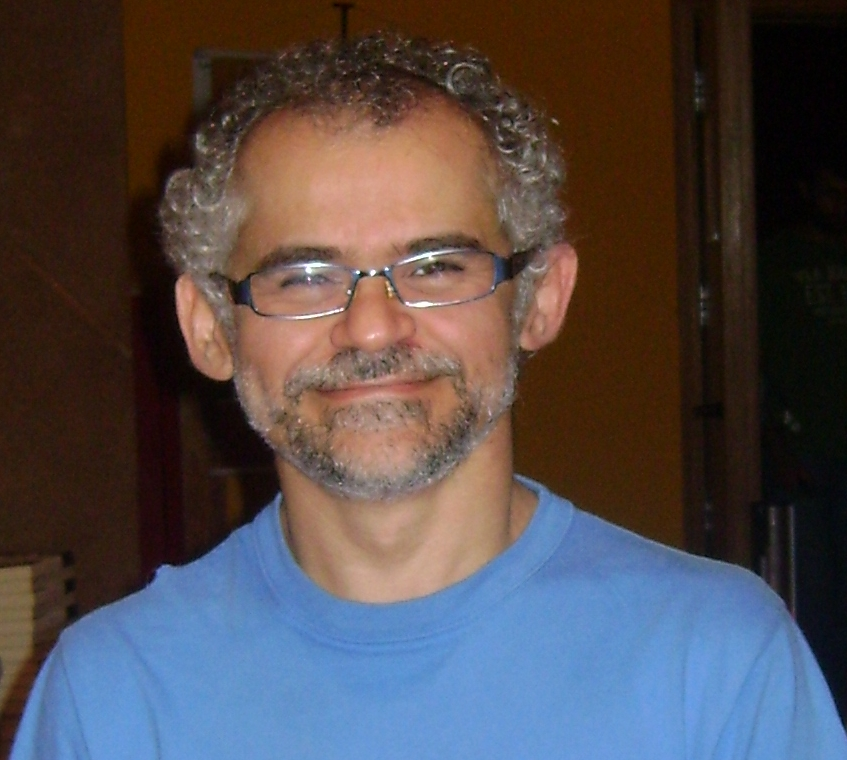
- Gero Camilo in 2011
- Born: Paulo Rogério da Silva; December 18, 1970 (age 55); Conjunto Esperança, Fortaleza, Brazil (Note: Conjunto Esperança (the neighborhood where he was born and raised) is a neighborhood that is located on the outskirts of Fortaleza (the capital of the state of Ceará), located next to the Parque Santa Rosa neighborhood (one of the oldest neighborhoods in Fortaleza).)
- Occupations: Actor, dramatist, singer-songwriter, poet
- Years active: 1995–present

Gero Camilo (born Paulo Rogério da Silva on December 18, 1970) is a Brazilian actor, dramatist, singer-songwriter and poet. A descendant of Indigenous, African, Portuguese, and Dutch people, he was born in Fortaleza, Ceará from parents of Acopiara. He was a militant of Liberation theology in Ceará, where he started to act in amateur theater when he was 19 years old. In 1994, he entered the School of Dramatic Art of University of São Paulo, acting on university productions, and concluded the course four years later.

In March 2022, he was cast as Didi, a character created and originally played by Renato Aragão, in the upcoming film Mussum: O Filmis, about the comedian who died in 1994.

== Personal life ==
He is openly gay and some of his most famous characters have ties to the LGBT community, such as Miss Pirangi from the 2012 TV Globo's telenovela Gabriela (which is a remake of the 1975 soap opera of the same name).

== Selected filmography ==
Films

- Brainstorm (2000)
- Behind the Sun (2001)
- Maids (2001)
- City of God (2002)
- Madame Satã (2002)
- Carandiru (2003)
- Man on Fire (2004)
- Assalto ao Banco Central (2011)
- I'd Receive the Worst News from Your Beautiful Lips (2011)
- Gabriela (2012)
- Mussum: O Filmis (2022)
- Papagaios (2026)

Telenovelas, series and miniseries

Year	Title	Role	Notes	Channel
2000	Brava Gente		Ep. "As Aventuras de Chico Norato Contra o Boto Vingativo"	Rede Globo
2005	Hoje É Dia de Maria	Zé Cangaia		Rede Globo
2009	O Amor Segundo Benjamim Schianberg	Sávio		TV Cultura
2009	A Noiva	João		
2009	Som & Fúria	Naum		Rede Globo
2011	Amor em Quatro Atos	José		Rede Globo
2012	Gabriela	Miss Pirangi	Supporting actor	Rede Globo
2015	Felizes para Sempre?	Carlos		Rede Globo
2021	Manhãs de Setembro	Aristedes		Amazon Prime Video
2025	Pablo & Luisão	Reynaldo	Episode: "Avestruz Maxx"	Globoplay

== Discography ==
- Canções de Invento (2008)
- Megatamainho (2014)
