= Hey! (Jullie album) =

Studio album by Jullie
- Released: September 22, 2009
- Recorded: 2008/2009; Estúdio Centoeum
- Genre: Pop, pop rock, flogger
- Length: 38:18
- Label: Deckdisc
- Producer: Sabrina Sanm

Jullie chronology
Sem Olhar Pra Trás (2009)	Hey! (2009)

Singles from Hey!
- 1. "Alice" Released: April 2, 2009; 2. "Hey!" Released: November 5, 2009

Hey! is the debut studio album by Brazilian recording artist Jullie. It was released on September 22, 2009, by Deckdisc. After writing songs for several established acts, Jullie released this album. The main theme of the songs is girl power. The songs are mostly inspired by Jullie's love of youth, rebellion, and discover who you are in 4.modern lifestyle. Musically, the album drew inspiration from pop and pop rock influenced by singers like Lily Allen, Madonna, Alanis Morissette, and its main reference, Katy Perry, directed to a feminist position. The album was praised by the young, calling Jullie as "Brazilian Katy Perry" for his music style and way of dressing. The first single "Alice" was released in April and the second single "Hey!" was released in November, 2009.

== Track listing ==
No.	Title	Length
1.	"Alice"	3:28
2.	"Deixa"	2:34
3.	"Despertar"	3:38
4.	"Hey!"	3:40
5.	"O Elo"	3:57
6.	"Por Você"	3:33
7.	"Amor Insano"	3:15
8.	"Roteiro Sem Final Feliz"	4:34
9.	"Nua"	3:29
10.	"Na Hora H"	3:14
