= September Mornings =

- Genre: Drama
- Created by: Luís Pinheiro
- Written by: Alice Marcone; Marcelo Montenegro; Josefina Trotta; Carla Meirelles
- Directed by: Luís Pinheiro; Dainara Toffoli
- Starring: Liniker; Gustavo Coelho; Thomás Aquino; Clodd Dias; Gero Camilo; Paulo Miklos; Karine Teles; Isabela Ordoñez
- Country of origin: Brazil
- Original language: Portuguese
- No. of seasons: 2
- No. of episodes: 11

Production
- Executive producer: Luís Pinheiro
- Production locations: São Paulo; Montevideo
- Running time: 28-37 minutes
- Production company: O2 Filmes

Original release
- Network: Amazon Prime Video
- Release: June 25, 2021 – September 23, 2022

September Mornings (Brazilian Portuguese: Manhãs de Setembro) is a Brazilian television drama series created by Luís Pinheiro, starring singer Liniker as Cassandra. The series premiered on Amazon Prime Video on June 25, 2021. The second season premiered on September 23, 2022.

== Synopsis ==
September Mornings tells the story of Cassandra (Liniker), a transgender woman working as a delivery driver for a mobile app. Currently living in São Paulo, she had to leave her hometown to pursue her dream of being a cover singer for Vanusa, a Brazilian singer from the 1970s. After struggling for many years, she has finally found her own apartment and is in love with Ivaldo (Thomás Aquino). Things get complicated when an ex-girlfriend, Leide (Karine Teles), re-enters her life with a boy who claims to be her son.

== Cast and characters ==
=== Main characters ===
- Liniker as Cassandra
- Thomás Aquino as Ivaldo, Cassandra's lover
- Karine Teles as Leide, Cassandra's ex-girlfriend
- Gustavo Coelho as Gersinho, Leide's son
- Paulo Miklos as Décio
- Isabela Ordoñez as Grazy
- Clodd Dias as Roberta
- Gero Camilo as Aristides

=== Recurring ===
- Elisa Lucinda as Vanusa (voice-over)
- Linn da Quebrada as Pedrita
- Dante Aganju as Bernardo
- Chelfa Caxino as Jana
- Silmara Deon as School Principal
- Inara dos Santos as Ivana
- Clébia Sousa as Irene
- Seu Jorge as Alexandre (Season 2)
- Samantha Schmütz as Ruth (Season 2)

== Episodes ==
| Season | Episodes | Originally released |
|---|---|---|
| 1 | 5 | June 25, 2021 |
| 2 | 6 | September 23, 2022 |

=== First Season (2021) ===
| No. in season | Title | Directed by | Written by | Original release date |
|---|---|---|---|---|
| 1 | "Just for Tonight (É Só Por Hoje)" | Luís Pinheiro | Alice Marcone, Marcelo Montenegro, & Josefina Trotta | June 25, 2021 |
| 2 | "Stop Calling me Dad! (Para De Me Chamar De Pai!)" | Luís Pinheiro | Alice Marcone, Marcelo Montenegro, & Josefina Trotta | June 25, 2021 |
| 3 | "Gersinho" | Dainara Toffoli | Alice Marcone, Carla Meirelles, & Marcelo Montenegro | June 25, 2021 |
| 4 | "Take it or Leave it (É Pegar ou Largar)" | Dainara Toffoli | Alice Marcone, Carla Meirelles, & Marcelo Montenegro | June 25, 2021 |
| 5 | "That's Right, Baby, Enjoy! (É Isso Mesmo, Baby, Enjoy!)" | Luís Pinheiro | Alice Marcone, Marcelo Montenegro, & Josefina Trotta | June 25, 2021 |

=== Second Season (2022) ===
| No. in season | Title | Directed by | Written by | Original release date |
|---|---|---|---|---|
| 1 | "Oh, the family life... What a bore (Ah Vida em Família... Que Preguiça)" | Luís Pinheiro | Josefina Trotta | September 23, 2022 |
| 2 | "The traditional Brazilian mess (A Baguncinha Tradicional Brasileira)" | Luís Pinheiro | Alice Marcone | September 23, 2022 |
| 3 | "Today we're having a show (E Hoje É Dia de Show)" | Luís Pinheiro | Marcelo Montenegro | September 23, 2022 |
| 4 | "Head up high or dead, never on my knees (De Pé ou Morta, de Joelhos Jamais)" | Dainara Toffoli | Marcelo Montenegro | September 23, 2022 |
| 5 | "Sing, sing... (Canta, Canta...)" | Dainara Toffoli | Alice Marcone | September 23, 2022 |
| 6 | "This can't be all there is to life (A Vida Não Pode Ser Só Isso)" | Luís Pinheiro | Alice Marcone, Marcelo Montenegro, and Josefina Trotta | September 23, 2022 |

== Awards ==
The first season was nominated for the Marathon award at MTV Millennial Awards Brasil,, Best Series at the F5 Awards,, Best Series or Mini-Series at the APCA Television Awards, and Best Drama Series at the Pena de Prata (Silver Feather) awards.

The second season was nominated for both Best Drama Series and Best Brazilian Series at the Pena de Prata awards. It won the award for Best Drama Series at the APCA Television Awards.

As the series lead, Liniker was nominated for Best Actress by the F5 Awards and by the Pena de Prata awards for the first season. She was also nominated for the Best Lead Performer in a Series award by Pena de Prata awards for the second season.

The series as a whole was nominated for the 34th GLAAD Media Awards in 2023.
