= Papagaios (film) =

- Theatrical release poster
- Directed by: Douglas Soares
- Written by: Douglas Soares
- Produced by: Mayra Lucas; Luiza Favale; Andy Malafaia; Paulo Serpa; Heitor Franulovic; Lucas Barão
- Starring: Gero Camilo; Ruan Aguiar; Angela Paz; Léo Jaime; Ernesto Piccolo; Babi Xavier; Claudete Troiano
- Production companies: Glaz Entretenimento; Meus Russos
- Distributed by: Olhar Filmes
- Release date: 23 April 2026
- Running time: 90 minutes
- Country: Brazil
- Language: Portuguese

Papagaios is a 2026 Brazilian thriller film written and directed by Douglas Soares. Starring Gero Camilo and Ruan Aguiar, the film revolves around two papagaios de pirata who will do anything to get media attention. The film won the awards for Best Film by the Audience Jury, Best Actor for Gero Camilo, Best Art Direction, and Best Sound Design at the 53rd Gramado Film Festival.

== Plot ==
In Brazil, the term papagaio de pirata (lit. 'pirate parrot') refers to individuals who try to position themselves behind journalists during live news segments in hopes of appearing on camera. They receive no payment for their participation, engaging in this activity as a hobby and with the aim of gaining some measure of fame.

Tunico is the most famous papagaio de pirata in Rio de Janeiro, living for the sole purpose of appearing on television and in newspapers, often as an extra at funerals of public figures or at disaster coverage. He consistently positions himself behind the reporter or in spots—such as that of a pallbearer, for example—that allow him to stand out. After a serious accident at the city's amusement park, Tunico meets young Beto, who dreams of becoming famous. Beto becomes his disciple, seeking to also become a papagaio de pirata, as famous as or even more famous than Tunico.

== Cast ==
- Gero Camilo as Tunico
- Ruan Aguiar as Beto
- Angela Paz as Lívia Paz
- Roney Villela as Borges
- Marcello Escorel as Russo
- Ernesto Piccolo as Clau
- Léo Jaime as himself
- Babi Xavier as herself
- Claudete Troiano as herself
- Eduardo Grillo as himself
- Flávio Birman as Batista
- Jorge Maya as Matias
- Cristiano Lopes as Clóvis

== Reception ==
Marcio Sallem, from the website Cinema com Crítica, stated that "Papagaios may even sound anachronistic" in times of instant celebrity-making on social media, but that the figure of the papagaio de pirata is "a synthesis of liquid modernity and the compulsion to exist only when seen". He highlights that the film operates in the "fertile ground between social satire and character study", with Tunico representing "a contemporary life in which appearing replaces being." Sallem praises the performances, affirming that Ruan Aguiar "adds a dark and unpredictable energy" and that Gero Camilo "fills the center of the frame with dominance, melancholy, and even comedic touches", delivering a complex performance. For the critic, the film demonstrates that "the obsession with fame is not born from technology, but finds in it merely new instruments", and that Douglas Soares keeps "our gaze engaged in the face of a highly original and remarkably current screenplay".
