= Linn da Quebrada =

Brazilian singer, actress, and screenwriter (born 1990)

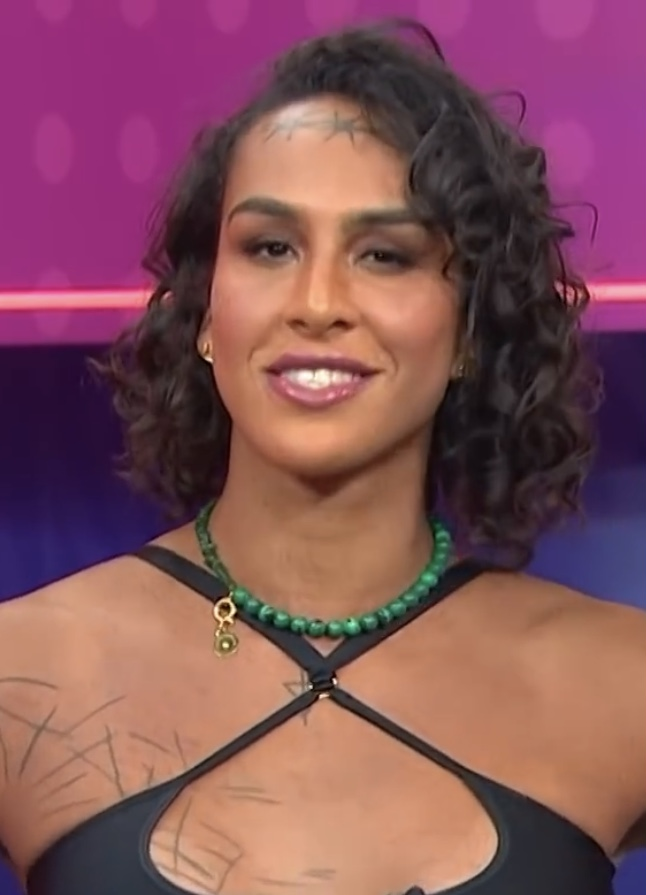
- Linn de Quebrada in 2022
- Born: 1990 (age 35–36)
- Other name: Lina Pereira dos Santos
- Occupations: Singer, actress, screenwriter, television personality

Linn da Quebrada (Double entendre in Portuguese, in English: Linn from the Hood or "Broken Beauty") is the stage name of Lina Pereira dos Santos, a Brazilian singer, actress, screenwriter, and television personality.

== Life ==
Lina Pereira was born in 1990 and grew up in a religious family of Jehovah's Witnesses in São Paulo. Her mother was a domestic worker from Alagoas, and her father left the family when she was 7 years old.

Under the stage name Linn da Quebrada, Pereira's music became known in Brazil after she released a funk song titled Enviadescer in May 2016. The lyrics of the song made fun of cisgender and heterosexual men. Its initial success took place on YouTube.

After Angela Davis praised Pereira's music and asked her to join the boycott of Israel, Pereira agreed to do so, stating that "music is also a response to the present [...] what we are living, what we are building and what we want to build". (Note: Original quote in Spanish: "la música es también una respuesta al presente, y nuestra producción musical es la respuesta a lo que estamos viviendo, a la que estamos construyendo y a lo que queremos construir") She was involved in founding the Associação de Travestis de Santo André.

In 2021, at age 30, Pereira got breast implants. She described them to Universo Online as a symbol of transformation, saying that she wanted people to look at her and recognize her as a travesti. In 2022, she said she has a fluid sexuality.

In 2022, Linn da Quebrada was a contestant on the 22nd season of the Brazilian reality show Big Brother Brasil, broadcast by TV Globo.

== Music ==
In 2017, Linn da Quebrada released an album titled Pajubá, which she described as "afro-funk-vogue".

As of May 17, 2021, Quebrada was preparing to release a second album titled Trava Linguas.

== TransMissão ==
In June 2021, the third season of the talk show TransMissão began, cohosted by Linn da Quebrada and Jup do Bairro on Canal Brasil. The guest in the first episode was Judith Butler.

== Recognition ==
In 2017, Linn da Quebrada was one of four trans people featured in the documentary Meu Corpo É Politico ("My Body Is Political"), directed by Alice Riff.

A Portuguese language documentary titled Bixa Travesty, named after a track on an album by Linn da Quebrada, focused on her performance and identity. An English version was released in 2018 under the title Tranny Fag. Peter Bradshaw described Tranny Fag in The Guardian as "[an] interesting, limited study", characterizing Quebrada as "an almost inexhaustible self-dramatiser". In the documentary, Quebrada describes herself as a "Molotov faggot".

In August 2018, Quebrada was featured in a film by Dazed, directed by Valter Carvalho. Mykki Blanco, then the magazine's guest editor, described her as "honest and assertive" and noted that she addressed issues including "race, sexuality, sex work and the politics of her transgender identity."

In June 2021, Quebrada was featured alongside Liniker on the cover of Vogue Brasil as a celebration of Pride Month. She appeared with Liniker in Amazon Prime Video's September Mornings (Manhãs de Setembro) later that same month.

== Bibliography ==
- De Melo Rocha, Rose; Rezende, Aline (May 1, 2021). "Diva da Sarjeta: ideologia enviadescida e blasfêmea pop-profana nas políticas de audiovisibilidade da travesti paulistana Linn da Quebrada" [Diva of the gutter: enviadescida ideology and pop-profane blasphemy in the audiovisibility politics of São Paulo´s travesti Linn da Quebrada]. Revista Contracampo. 38 (1). doi:10.22409/contracampo.v38i1.28079. ISSN 2238-2577.
