= Certa Manhã Acordei de Sonhos Intranquilos =

2009 album by Otto

Studio album by Otto
- Released: September 1, 2009
- Genres: Mangue Bit; rock; MPB
- Length: 40:29
- Labels: Nublu; Arterial Music
- Producers: Otto; Pupillo

Otto chronology
Sem Gravidade (2003)	Certa Manhã Acordei de Sonhos Intranquilos (2009)	The Moon 1111 (2012)

Certa Manhã Acordei de Sonhos Intranquilos is the fourth studio album of Brazilian singer Otto’s solo career, released in 2009. The album blends elements of manguebeat, rock, and música popular brasileira.

== Background ==
Otto's work in Certa Manhã Acordei de Sonhos Intranquilos was primarily inspired by Franz Kafka's, The Metamorphosis, strong connections between the singer's personal life and its relationship to Kafka's book. The album’s title is a transcription of the first sentence of Kafka’s novel, The Metamorphosis, in which a man wakes up transformed into a cockroach:

One morning, when Gregor Samsa woke from troubled dreams

— Franz Kafka, The Metamorphosis

According to Otto, these restless dreams refer to the negotiations with record labels, a factor that ultimately led to the album’s independent production, in addition to his divorce from actress Alessandra Negrini. The album’s production brought together different musical styles, represented by the artists who contributed to it, such as Mexican singer Julieta Venegas, as well as São Paulo-based singer Céu and the Pernambuco-based bands Nação Zumbi and Cordel do Fogo Encantado. Singer Bebel Gilberto was supposed to appear on the album but was unable to due to scheduling conflicts. The album cover art was created by the artist Tunga.

== Track list ==
No.	Title	Writer(s)	Length
1.	"Crua"	Otto	3:30
2.	"O Leite" (featuring Céu)	Otto	2:49
3.	"Janaína"	Otto, Pupillo, Fernando Catatau, Dengue	4:40
4.	"Meu Mundo Dança"	Otto, Pupillo, Rica Amabis	3:33
5.	"6 Minutos"	Otto, İlhan Erşahin	5:57
6.	"Lágrimas Negras" (featuring Julieta Venegas)	Jorge Mautner, Nelson Jacobina	3:33
7.	"Saudade" (featuring Julieta Venegas)	Otto, Fernando Catatau, Julieta Venegas	3:23
8.	"Naquela Mesa"	Sérgio Bittencourt	4:08
9.	"Filha"	Otto	4:57
10.	"Agora Sim"	Otto, Pupillo	3:59
Total length:			40:29

== Release ==
The album was released on CD in 2009. In 2015, the album was re-released on vinyl.

== Reception ==
Bruno Saito, writing for the Folha de S. Paulo newspaper, described the album as excellent, noting that: “He reemerges reinvigorated, illustrating the romantic idea that moments of crisis give rise to beautiful works of art. Certa Manhã Acordei de Sonhos Intranquilos is, by far, Otto’s best and most vigorous album.” The newspaper O Estado de S. Paulo described the album as “redemptive.”

Larry Rohter of the American newspaper The New York Times praised the album, stating, “In the world of Brazilian music, Otto occupies a place as unusual as his name. For more than a decade, he has been seen as the guy who blends electronic music with traditional African rhythms he encountered while growing up in a small town in the countryside, a sort of ‘Moby of the countryside.’”

=== Legacy ===
In a poll conducted in May 2022, the album ranked 312th place a list of the 500 best Brazilian albums, according to a survey of more than 160 music experts conducted by the Discoteca Básica podcast. Another of the musician's works is mentioned on the list, Samba pra Burro, from 1998, ranked 331st. That same year, Otto gave an interview to discuss the album with drummer Charles Gavin on the show O Som do Vinil, broadcast on Canal Brasil, during which Gavin praised the album's “diversity.”

In 2023, Brazilian journalist and music critic Luiz Felipe Carneiro ranked the album 12th in his series on the best Brazilian music albums of the 2000s.
