= Tranny Fag =

2018 film directed by Claudia Priscilla, Kiko Goifman

- Bixa Travesty
- Directed by: Claudia Priscilla; Kiko Goifman
- Produced by: Evelyn Mab
- Starring: Linn da Quebrada; Jup do Bairro
- Cinematography: Karla Meneghetti
- Production company: Paleotv
- Release date: 18 February 2018 (Berlin)
- Country: Brazil
- Language: Portuguese

Tranny Fag (Portuguese: Bixa Travesty) is a 2018 Brazilian documentary film directed by Claudia Priscilla and Kiko Goifman about Linn da Quebrada, a travesti Brazilian musician and activist whose tactics for confronting homophobia and transphobia include radical performance art, film, and music.

The film had its theatrical premiere at the 2018 Berlin International Film Festival, where it won a Teddy Award as the best LGBTQ-themed documentary film of the festival.
