= Canções de Invento =

Studio album by Gero Camilo
- Released: September 23, 2008
- Genre: Música popular brasileira
- Length: 55:28
- Label: Macaúba da Terra
- Producer: Luiz Gayotto

Gero Camilo chronology
Canções de Invento (2008)	Megatamainho (2014)

Canções de Invento is the debut album by Brazilian singer, actor and director Gero Camilo, released in 2008. It features partnerships with Ceumar, Celso Sim, Tata Fernandes, Simone Sou, Lirinha, Nina Blauth, Arícia Mess and lyrics about love, modernity, arts and the city. All songs are entirely or partially written by Camilo, except "Vem Amor", by Marat Descartes.

Camilo considered the idea of releasing an album in 2002, when he produced a book of short stories and plays called Macaúba da Terra, which he wrote when he was studying at the Drama School of the University of São Paulo (1994–1998) and in which he identified a "musical potentiality". Before he went to studio, Camilo performed it in a play-like show, under the name Canto de Cozinha (Kitchen Singing). About the diversity of genres in the album, Camilo said "the confluence of genres is big food for the contemporary artist, who can expand their action space and sharpen their poetic speech instead of trying to fit themselves".

== Track listing ==
No.	Title	Length
1.	"Cabeleira de Aipim" (Cassava Hair; featuring Lirinha, Tata Fernandes e Arícia Mess)	4:38
2.	"Anunciação" (Annunciation)	4:29
3.	"Enigmática Máscara" (Enigmatic Mask)	4:57
4.	"O Aprendiz" (The Apprentice)	3:52
5.	"Gogós Dodóis" (Sick Throats (Note: "Gogó" and "dodói" are Brazilian slangs for "throat" and "sick"/"ill", respectively.))	3:29
6.	"A Modernidade" (The Modernity)	3:57
7.	"Gravidade" (Gravity; featuring Gustavo Machado e Cristiano Karnas)	3:24
8.	"Tintura" (Tincture; featuring Rubi)	4:56
9.	"Vem Amor" (Come (My) Love; featuring Marat Descartes)	3:35
10.	"Carta de Puebla" (Letter of Puebla)	1:58
11.	"Gesto Delicado" (Delicate Gesture)	4:04
12.	"Jobinamente"	6:34
13.	"Vai Desabar" (It Will Fall; featuring Lirinha, Luiz Gayotto, Rubi, Ceumar e Tata Amaral)	5:35
Total length:		55:28
