= Worms (film) =

2013 film directed by Paolo Conti, Arthur Nunes

- Theatrical release poster
- Directed by: Paolo Conti; Arthur Nunes
- Written by: Marcos Bernstein; Melanie Dimantas; Thomas LaPierre; Romeu di Sessa
- Produced by: Paulo Boccato; Joana Lúcia Bocchini; Paolo Conti; Mayra Lucas; Arthur Nunes
- Starring: Cadu Paschoal; Jullie; Yago Machado; Rita Lee; Anderson Silva; Daniel Boaventura; Isabella Fiorentino; Duda Espinoza; Luiz Sérgio Navarro; Manolo Rey; Sérgio Stern
- Cinematography: Philippe Arruda; Klaus Zanella Schlickmann
- Edited by: Richard Comeau; Jose Guilherme Delgado
- Music by: Henrique Tanji
- Production companies: Animaking Studios; Globo Filmes; Glaz Entertainment
- Distributed by: 20th Century Fox (through Fox International Productions)
- Release dates: December 20, 2013 (Brazil); March 27, 2015 (United States)
- Running time: 80 minutes
- Countries: Brazil; Canada
- Languages: English; Portuguese
- Budget: $3.2 million (R$10,500,000)
- Box office: $688,009 (Brazil)

Worms (Portuguese: Minhocas) is a 2013 animated adventure fantasy comedy film directed by Paolo Conti and Arthur Nunes. It is the first Brazilian stop-motion animated film. It was released in Brazil on December 20, 2013.

== Plot ==
When Junior, an overprotected preteen worm, is accidentally brought up to the surface, he must face a risky journey back home.

== Cast ==
- Cadu Paschoal as Junior
- Jullie as Linda
- Yago Machado as Nico
- Rita Lee as Martha
- Anderson Silva as Hairy (Cabelo)
- Daniel Boaventura as Big Wig / Mister Jumping
- Isabella Fiorentino as Florence
- Duda Espinoza as Noodles
- Luiz Sérgio Navarro as Arthur
- Manolo Rey as Ranho
- Sérgio Stern as François
