= Tudo Pode Mudar =

Song by Metrô

from the album Olhar
- A-side: "Ti Ti Ti"
- Released: 1985
- Recorded: 1984/1985
- Genre: New wave, synth-pop, synth-rock
- Length: 3:34
- Label: Epic Records
- Songwriters: Joe Euthanazia, Ronaldo Santos
- Producer: Luiz Carlos Maluly

"Tudo Pode Mudar" (Portuguese for "Everything Can Change") is a song from the Metrô album Olhar. It was written by the gaúcho singer Joe Euthanazia (in his second collaboration with Metrô, the first one being "Johnny Love") with Ronaldo Santos, and released as a B-side to the single "Ti Ti Ti". It is one of the band's most memorable hits thanks to the massive airplay it received at the time of its release, making it the second most played song on Brazilian radios in 1985 after "We Are the World". A music video for the song, directed by Eid Walesko, was released in the same year.

Euthanazia himself covered the song on his only release Joe, which was released in 1989. Further cover versions were made by Eliana (in her 2004 album Diga Sim) and, more recently (in 2010), by Jullie.

== Jullie cover version ==
"Tudo Pode Mudar"

Single by Jullie

from the album Malhação ID: Trilha Sonora Nacional
- Released: February 10, 2010
- Genre: Pop rock, dance-pop
- Length: 3:08
- Label: Deckdisc
- Songwriters: Joe Euthanazia, Ronaldo Santos
- Producer: Rogério Vaz

Jullie singles chronology
"Hey!" (2009)	"Tudo Pode Mudar" (2010)	"Eu Não Mudaria Nada em Você" (2010)

Jullie's version of the song was originally included on the soundtrack of Malhação ID, the 17th season of the long-running soap opera Malhação (broadcast from November 9, 2009 to August 20, 2010). It was released as a digital single on the iTunes Store by Deckdisc on February 10, 2010.

=== Track listing ===
1. "Tudo Pode Mudar" – 3:08

=== Chart performance ===
Chart (2010)	Peak position
Brazil (Hot 100 Airplay)	66
Brazil (Hot Pop & Popular)	51
