= Bia Lessa =

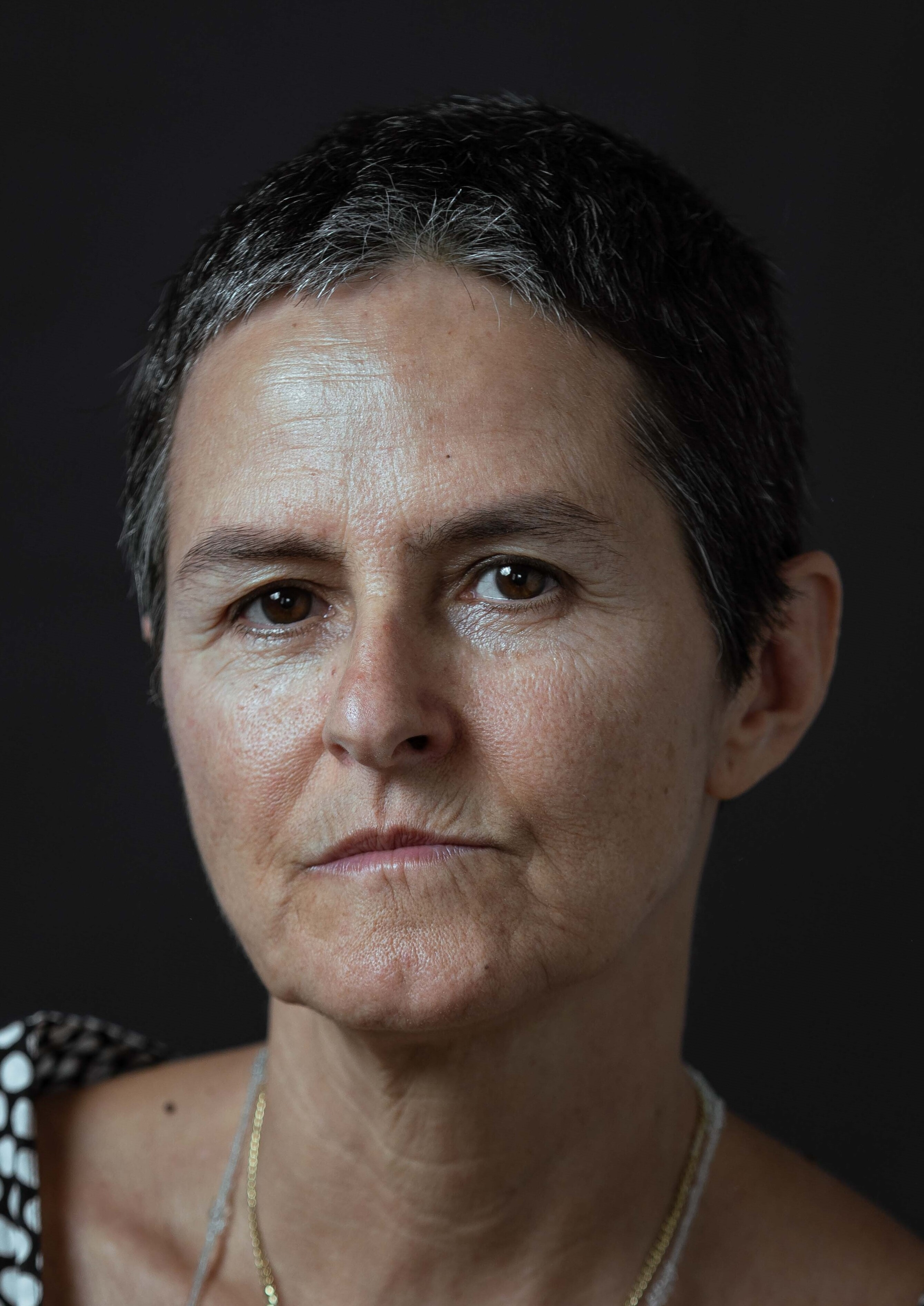
- Lessa in 2018
- Born: Beatriz Ferreira Lessa; 10 June 1958 (age 68); São Paulo, São Paulo, Brazil
- Occupations: Film director, theater director, curator
- Years active: 1983–present
- Spouse: Dany Roland
- Children: 2
- Website: bialessa.com

Beatriz Ferreira Lessa (born 10 June 1958), known professionally as Bia Lessa, is a Brazilian filmmaker, theater director and former theater actress, and curator. She very often collaborates with her husband, Dany Roland.

== Biography ==
Bia Lessa was born in São Paulo on 10 June 1958, but her family later moved to Rio de Janeiro. At a young age Lessa had a penchant to acting, and eventually took lessons at the prestigious O Tablado Theater. One of her first acting credits was in an adaptation of Maria Clara Machado's Maroquinhas Fru-Fru, made by Wolf Maya. She later founded her own theater group, Carranca, alongside Gilda Guilhon and Daniel Dantas, and one of the first plays they ever performed was Bertolt Brecht's Mr Puntila and his Man Matti.

In 1981 she acted in Nelson Rodrigues' O Eterno Retorno and in Antunes Filho's adaptation of Mário de Andrade's novel Macunaíma; she was one of Filho's major collaborators for two years. She would, however, abandon her acting career to become a theater director, and in 1983 she directed her first play, an adaptation of Graciliano Ramos' novel A Terra dos Meninos Pelados. Her play was very well received, what would inspire her to direct further plays, her most famous outputs being adaptations of Virginia Woolf's Orlando (starring Fernanda Torres in the title role), Anton Chekhov's Three Sisters, Robert Musil's The Man Without Qualities and Jules Verne's Journey to the Center of the Earth. Most (if not all) of her plays count with the participation of her husband, musician Dany Roland, who contributes with the sound design and occasionally the soundtrack itself. In 1983, she played Ordélia in the hit Sítio do Picapau Amarelo. In 1997 Lessa and Roland directed their first independent full-length film, the critically acclaimed Crede-Mi, which was loosely based on Thomas Mann's 1951 novel The Holy Sinner. Lessa and Roland have two daughters: Maria and Clara.

In 1999 she organized the expo Brasileiro que Nem Eu. Que nem Quem? at the FAAP in São Paulo, to critical acclaim. She also designed the Brazilian pavilion at the Expo 2000 in Hanover, Germany, and organized the Grande Sertão: Veredas expo in 2006, which celebrated the 50th anniversary of the publication of João Guimarães Rosa's eponymous novel, at the newly inaugurated Museu da Língua Portuguesa.

In 2002 she directed the music videos for synthpop band Metrô's tracks "Mensagem de Amor" and "Achei Bonito"; her husband serves as the band's drummer.

In 2010 she directed an adaptation of Giuseppe Verdi's opera Il trovatore, which premiered at the reopening of the Municipal Theater of Rio de Janeiro after its extensive restoration process. In the same year she was hired by the Ministry of Culture to organize the ceremony of the Order of Cultural Merit.

In 2013 Lessa and Gringo Cardia were invited to serve as the carnavalescos of the GRES São Clemente samba school. Cardia, however, later abandoned the project because of creative divergences with the school's directorial staff.

In 2014 she idealized and founded the Paço do Frevo Museum in Recife, Pernambuco.

More recently, in 2016, Lessa designed a pavilion for the Summer Olympics that took place in Rio de Janeiro. In the same year she also co-directed, alongside Dany Roland, their first movie since Crede-Mi, Então Morri, which premiered at the Rio de Janeiro International Film Festival.

== Filmography ==
=== Television ===
Year	Title	Role	Notes
1983	Sítio do Picapau Amarelo	Ordélia	Episode: "Emília Borralheira"

== Theater participation ==
=== As director ===
- The home of the Naked Boys Graciliano Ramos
- Origin Scene Haroldo de Campos
- Orlando - text by Virginia Woolf
- Journey to the Center of the Earth Jules Verne
- Portuguese Letters Mariana Alcoforado
- The Man Without Qualities Robert Musil
- Football Alberto Renault
- The Three Sisters Anton Chekhov
- Doll House Henrik Ibsen
- Medea
- Brief Forms of Bia Lessa and Maria Borba
- Grande Sertão: Veredas Guimarães Rosa (2017)
- P I Insane Panorama André Sant'anna, Jô Bilac (2018)

=== Scenery and costumes ===
- Claros Breus - Tour by Maria Bethânia
- Adorable Bastard by Leilah Assumpção
- Brazilian - Maria Bethania
- Time, time, time - Maria Bethania
- Inside the Sea there's River and Party - Maria Bethania
- Love and Devotion - Maria Bethania
- Love Letter - Maria Bethânia Tour
