= Metrô (band) =

Brazilian new wave band

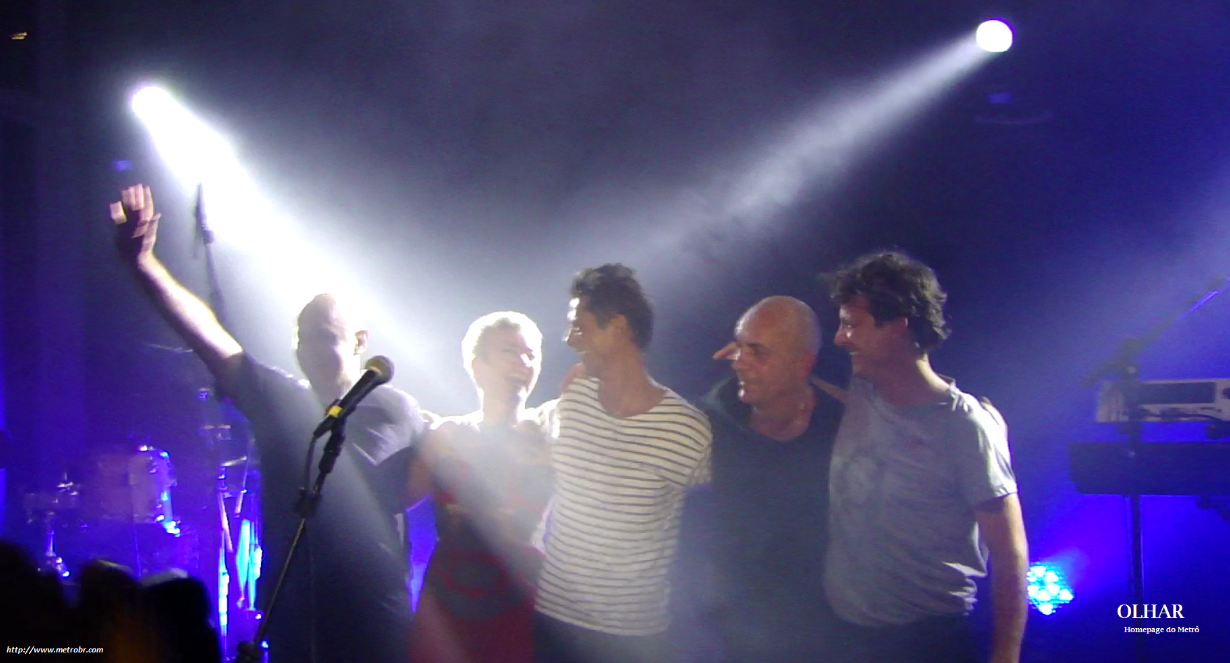
- The band after their one-off performance at the La Luna Club in São Paulo, on November 8, 2014. From left to right: Dany Roland, Virginie Boutaud, Yann Laouenan, Xavier Leblanc and Alec Haiat

Background information
- Also known as: A Gota Suspensa (1978–1984)
- Origin: São Paulo, São Paulo, Brazil
- Genres: Progressive rock (early); new wave, synth-pop, synth-rock, pop rock
- Years active: 1978–1988; 2002–2004; 2015–present; (one-off reunion: 2014)
- Labels: Underground Discos e Artes, Epic Records, Trama, Warner Music Group
- Members: Virginie Boutaud; Dany Roland; Alec Haiat; Yann Laouenan; Xavier Leblanc
- Past members: Pedro Parq; Marcel Zimberg; André Fonseca; Edmundo Carneiro; Donatinho; Pedro Albuquerque

Metrô is a Brazilian band formed in 1978, then known as A Gota Suspensa before renaming themselves in 1984. Beginning as a progressive rock band, they later shifted to a more synth-pop-influenced direction, becoming one of the most successful groups in the then-thriving Brazilian rock/new wave scene.

== History ==
=== Early years and A Gota Suspensa (1978–1984) ===
The band that would become Metrô was founded in 1978, under the name A Gota Suspensa ("The Suspended Drop"), by six friends (all of them coincidentally French Brazilians) who studied together at the Lycée Pasteur in São Paulo: former model and actress Virginie Boutaud (vocals), Alec Haiat (electric guitar), Marcel Zimberg (sax), Yann Laouenan (keyboards), Xavier Leblanc (bass) and Daniel "Dany" Roland (drums). They were originally an experimental/progressive rock ensemble heavily inspired by acts such as Pink Floyd, The Beatles, Novos Baianos and the Tropicalista movement, among others, and toured extensively around Brazil to perform in numerous music festivals. In 1983 they released a self-titled album via independent label Underground Discos e Artes; despite being a commercial failure, it was very well received by the critics, and acquired a strong cult following as years went by.

The album caught the attention of Epic Records, who offered them a contract but at the same time demanded them to make their musical style more "accessible"; the band complied (with the exception of Zimberg, who would leave the band after their change of style), and developed a brighter and less experimental pop-inflected sound in the likes of Blondie, Rita Lee and Laurie Anderson. Afterwards, A Gota Suspensa changed its name to Metrô in 1984; their first release under this moniker was the successful 7" single "Beat Acelerado", which came out in the same year.

=== Olhar, rise to fame and Virginie's departure (1985–1986) ===
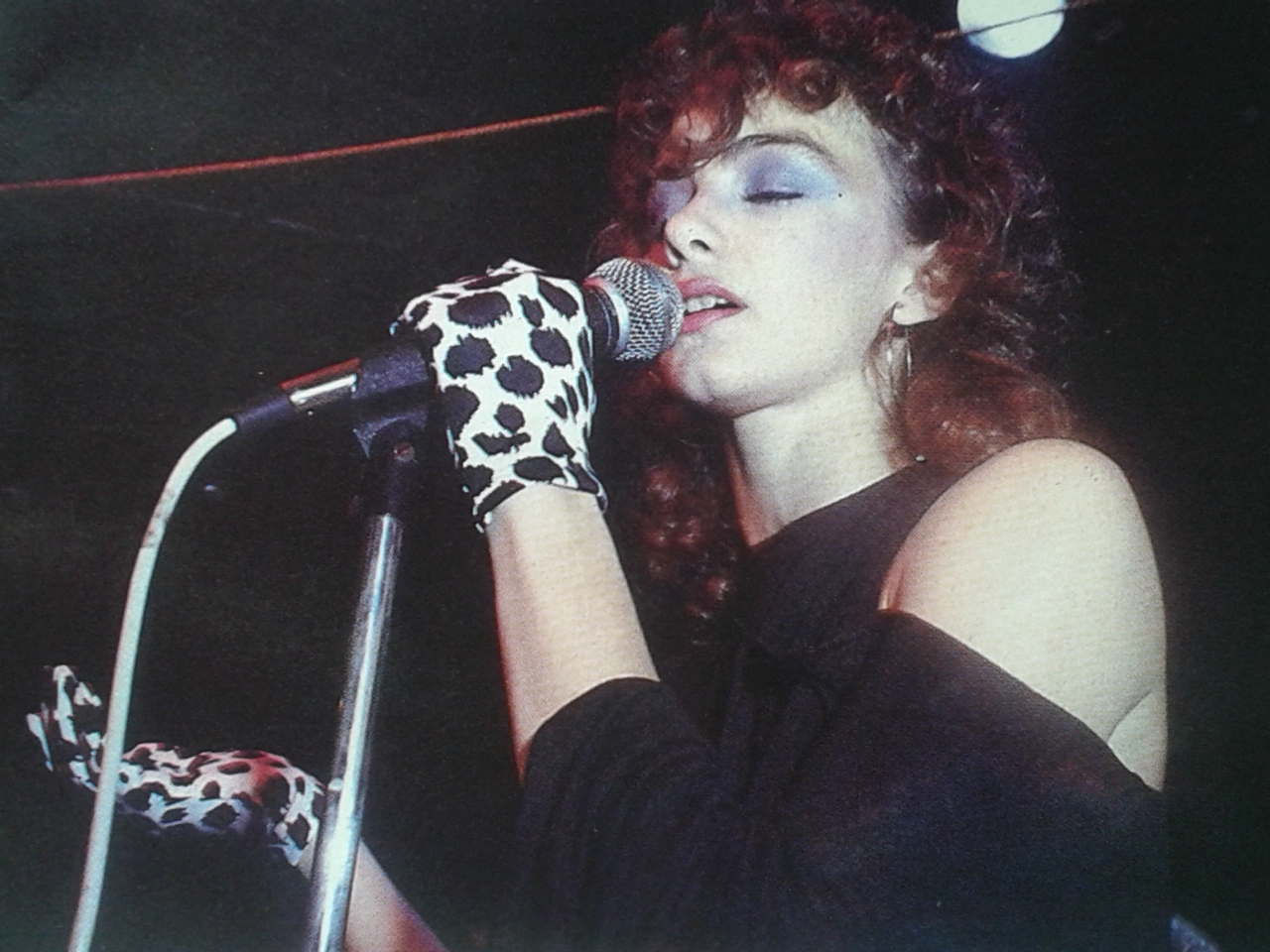
Metrô's vocalist, Virginie Boutaud, in 1985

In 1985 Metrô released their first studio album, Olhar, which was a commercial success and contained the band's most famous songs, such as "Tudo Pode Mudar", "Cenas Obscenas" (written by and featuring former João Penca e Seus Miquinhos Amestrados member Léo Jaime on guitar and backing vocals), "Johnny Love" (included in the soundtrack of Lael Rodrigues' 1985 film Rock Estrela, in which Metrô cameod alongside Jaime) and "Ti Ti Ti" (used as the opening theme of the eponymous telenovela which ran from 1985 to 1986). The album also counted with guest appearances by Guilherme Isnard (of Zero fame) and new wave band Degradée, in which Alec Haiat's brother Freddy played in. The band also cameod as themselves in Francisco de Paula's film Areias Escaldantes the same year.

The band soon grew to be one of the most famous and successful acts of Brazil, touring extensively (sometimes they performed seven shows in a week) and constantly appearing in numerous variety shows of the time. They also contributed with a song for the popular children's TV series Balão Mágico, "Não Dá pra Parar a Música".

Despite their massive success, Virginie was growing weary of the band's convoluted touring schedule; furthermore, the other band members wanted to shift to a more "mature and daring" musical direction influenced by acts such as Legião Urbana and Titãs. This brought numerous frictions and creative divergences between Virginie and her bandmates, what led her to be abruptly fired from the band in 1986. Two years later, she formed the short-lived solo project Virginie & Fruto Proibido, releasing with them only one album, Crime Perfeito.

=== A Mão de Mao, split-up and aftermath (1987–1988) ===
Virginie was eventually replaced by Portuguese musician Pedro d'Orey (a.k.a. Pedro Parq), who was living in São Paulo at the time and was famous for being one of the founding members of the experimental rock group Mler Ife Dada. With D'Orey, the band shifted to a more avant-garde sonority heavily reminiscent of their A Gota Suspensa era; he originally wanted to change the band's name from Metrô to "Tristes Tigres" ("Sad Tigers") in order to reflect their shift in direction, but Epic did not allow it. And so, in 1987, the band's second album (and the only one with D'Orey on vocals), A Mão de Mao, came out. A couple of months after the album's release, drummer Dany Roland left the band and was briefly replaced by Edmundo Carneiro.

Despite a somewhat positive reception, A Mão de Mao was a commercial flop, with the band's new musical direction having heavily alienated its former fans. Not being able to recover their fanbase, Metrô split up in 1988, with its members pursuing different projects: Dany Roland and Xavier Leblanc briefly played for Okotô, and after moving temporarily to Brussels, Belgium, Roland and Yann Laouenan formed the alternative rock band The Passengers (not to be mistaken with an earlier, also Belgian post-punk band with the same name formed in the late 1970s) alongside Diako Diakoff, Denis Moulin, TC and Jack Roskam, releasing a fairly successful self-titled album in 1992. Leblanc later opened a French bistro in São Paulo, La Tartine, while Roland settled in Rio de Janeiro, where he began a career as an actor and sound designer, frequently collaborating with his wife Bia Lessa on her theater plays; the couple also directed two critically acclaimed independent full-length films, Crede-Mi (1997) and Então Morri (2016). Yann Laouenan moved to Jijoca de Jericoacoara, Ceará. Alec and Freddy Haiat opened a musical instruments store, Habro, in São Paulo. Pedro d'Orey briefly returned to Portugal, where he formed other musical projects, but later moved back to São Paulo, where he now works as an interior designer.

Virginie abandoned the musical career in 1995, and left Brazil in 1996 with her companion, French diplomat Jean-Michel Manent, whom she married in 1999, having with him two daughters. Before settling in Saint-Orens-de-Gameville, France in 2013, she, Manent and their daughters lived in places such as Namibia, Mozambique, Uruguay and Madagascar. Manent died of cancer on June 7, 2015.

=== Déjà-Vu (2002–2004) ===
During a trip to Rio de Janeiro in late 2001, Virginie, Roland and Laouenan met, and after being approached by their former producer/manager, Luiz Carlos Maluly, talks about a possible reunion began, which eventually came to happen the following year with the recording of their first studio album in 17 years: Déjà-Vu, released by independent label Trama. Alec Haiat decided not to partake in the reunion due to "personal reasons" and his involvement with other projects at the time, and so was replaced by Patife Band and Okotô member André Fonseca. Xavier Leblanc, who was also very busy with his bistro, only served as a session member on two tracks, being subsequently replaced by Pedro Albuquerque. Heavily inspired by folkloric Brazilian songs, samba, bossa nova and MPB both in sonority and lyrical themes, Déjà-Vu counted with the participation of a vast array of guest musicians, such as Preta Gil, Jorge Mautner, Nélson Jacobina, Lucas Santtana, Waly Salomão and Otto. One year after the album's release Yann parted ways with Metrô and was replaced by Donatinho, son of pianist João Donato.

After a series of tours around Brazil, France, England, Portugal and Mozambique, Metrô ceased activities once more in 2004. Beforehand they took part in the compilation Amália Revisited, a tribute album to Portuguese singer Amália Rodrigues, in which they covered her song "Meu Amor, Meu Amor". It was released in 2005 by Different World Records.

=== 30th anniversary show, reunion and new album (2014–) ===
The band's original line-up reunited for a one-time show on November 8, 2014, at the La Luna Club in São Paulo, to celebrate the 50th anniversary of the Lycée Pasteur, as well as Metrô's 30th anniversary.

In May 2015 Metrô announced a new reunion, once more with its original line-up; their comeback show would take place at the Virada Cultural in São Paulo on June 21, but it was ultimately cancelled due to the death of Virginie's husband two weeks prior. (They ultimately played at the 2016 Virada Cultural on May 22, though.) A special 30-year anniversary re-issue of their debut Olhar, originally scheduled to come out in 2015 but delayed due to minor setbacks, was released on August 5, 2016 via Warner Music Group.

According to Dany Roland, the band is currently working on their fourth album; they performed live on Domingo Legal on August 16, 2015, playing what would become the album's first single, "Dando Voltas no Mundo". On October 14, 2016, they made available through many music streaming services the album's second single, "A Vida É Bela (Lalaiá)".

== Line-up ==
=== Current members ===
- Virginie Boutaud – vocals (1978–1986, 2002–2004, 2014, 2015–present)
- Daniel "Dany" Roland – drums (1978–1987, 2002–2004, 2014, 2015–present)
- Alec Haiat – electric guitar (1978–1988, 2014, 2015–present)
- Yann Laouenan – keyboards (1978–1988, 2002–2003, 2014, 2015–present)
- Xavier Leblanc – bass guitar (1978–1988, 2002, 2014, 2015–present)

=== Former members ===
- Pedro Parq (Pedro d'Orey) – vocals (1986–1988)
- Marcel Zimberg – sax (1978–1984)
- Edmundo Carneiro – drums (1987–1988)
- André Fonseca – electric guitar (2002–2004)
- Donatinho – keyboards (2003–2004)
- Pedro Albuquerque – bass guitar (2002–2004)

== Discography ==
=== Studio albums ===
Year	Album
1983	A Gota Suspensa: Label: Underground Discos e Artes; Format: Vinyl; Released as A Gota Suspensa
1985	Olhar: Label: Epic Records; Format: Vinyl, CD; Re-released in 2016 by Warner Music Group
1987	A Mão de Mao: Label: Epic Records; Format: Vinyl
2002	Déjà-Vu: Label: Trama; Format: CD

=== Singles ===
Year	Single	Album
1984	"Beat Acelerado"	Olhar
1985	"Cenas Obscenas" (feat. Léo Jaime)	Olhar
1985	"Ti Ti Ti"	Olhar
1985	"Não Dá pra Parar a Música" (feat. Turma do Balão Mágico)	A Turma do Balão Mágico
1987	"Gato Preto"	A Mão de Mao
1987	"Lágrimas Imóveis"	A Mão de Mao
2002	"Achei Bonito"	Déjà-Vu
2002	"Resemblances"	Déjà-Vu
2002	"Mensagem de Amor"	Déjà-Vu
2015	"Dando Voltas no Mundo"	Non-album song
2016	"A Vida É Bela (Lalaiá)"	Non-album song

=== Compilations ===
Year	Album
2005	Amália Revisited: Label: Different World; Format: CD; Contributed with the song "Meu Amor, Meu Amor"
