= A Gota Suspensa =

Studio album by A Gota Suspensa
- Released: 1983
- Recorded: February/July 1983
- Genres: Experimental rock, progressive rock, new wave, synth-rock
- Label: Underground Discos e Artes
- Producer: Luiz Antônio Ribas

Virginie Boutaud chronology
A Gota Suspensa (1983)	Olhar (1985)

A Gota Suspensa (Portuguese for "The Suspended Drop") is the only release by A Gota Suspensa, a Brazilian experimental/progressive rock band formed in São Paulo in 1978 and which would acquire bigger fame after changing its name to Metrô in 1984. As such, it comprised Virginie Boutaud on vocals, Alec Haiat on guitars, Yann Laouenan on keyboards, Xavier Leblanc on bass and Daniel "Dany" Roland on drums, plus saxophonist Marcel Zimberg, who left the band after they changed their name and musical direction. (Leblanc was busy studying during the album's recording sessions though, and for that was replaced by Tavinho Fialho.)

Released in 1983 by independent label Underground Discos e Artes, A Gota Suspensa was a commercial failure, but received a fairly good critical reception, to the point of Epic Records offering them a contract. However, Epic also demanded them to change their sonority towards a more "accessible" direction, and so, in 1984, A Gota Suspensa changed its name to Metrô, removing the prog/experimental elements of their sonority.

The album is long out-of-print, being never re-released under CD format, but to this day it has a small cult following, with "A Gota" and "As Aventuras do Homem-Arame" being minor hits.

== Track listing ==
No.	Title	Lyrics	Music	English title	Length
1.	"High Society"	Instrumental	Yann Laouenan		1:35
2.	"Convite ao Amor"	Vicente França, A Gota Suspensa	Alec Haiat	Invitation to Love	3:44
3.	"Pourquoi?"	A Gota Suspensa	Alec Haiat	Why?	2:27
4.	"As Aventuras do Homem-Arame"	Eli Joory, A Gota Suspensa	Yann Laouenan	The Adventures of Wire-Man	3:11
5.	"Voyage"	Instrumental	Yann Laouenan		7:53
6.	"A Gota"	Alec Haiat, Dany Roland, Eli Joory, Freddy Haiat, Mike	Alec Haiat, Freddy Haiat	The Drop	4:38
7.	"Sonho"	Elvira, A Gota Suspensa	Yann Laouenan	Dream	2:23
8.	"Apocalypse"	Instrumental	Alec Haiat		7:25
9.	"Lotus"	Instrumental	Alec Haiat, Yann Laouenan		2:52

== Personnel ==
- Virginie Boutaud – vocals
- Daniel "Dany" Roland – drums
- Marcel Zimberg – sax, flute
- Yann Laouenan – keyboards
- Alec Haiat – guitar
- Tavinho Fialho – bass
- Vicente França – additional vocals (track 2)
- Michel, Sabrina – vocals (track 9)
- Eli Joory – dog (track 7)
- Luiz Antônio Ribas – production
- Edy Bianchi – recording, mixing
- Estúdio O que Pintar – cover art
