= Otto (singer) =

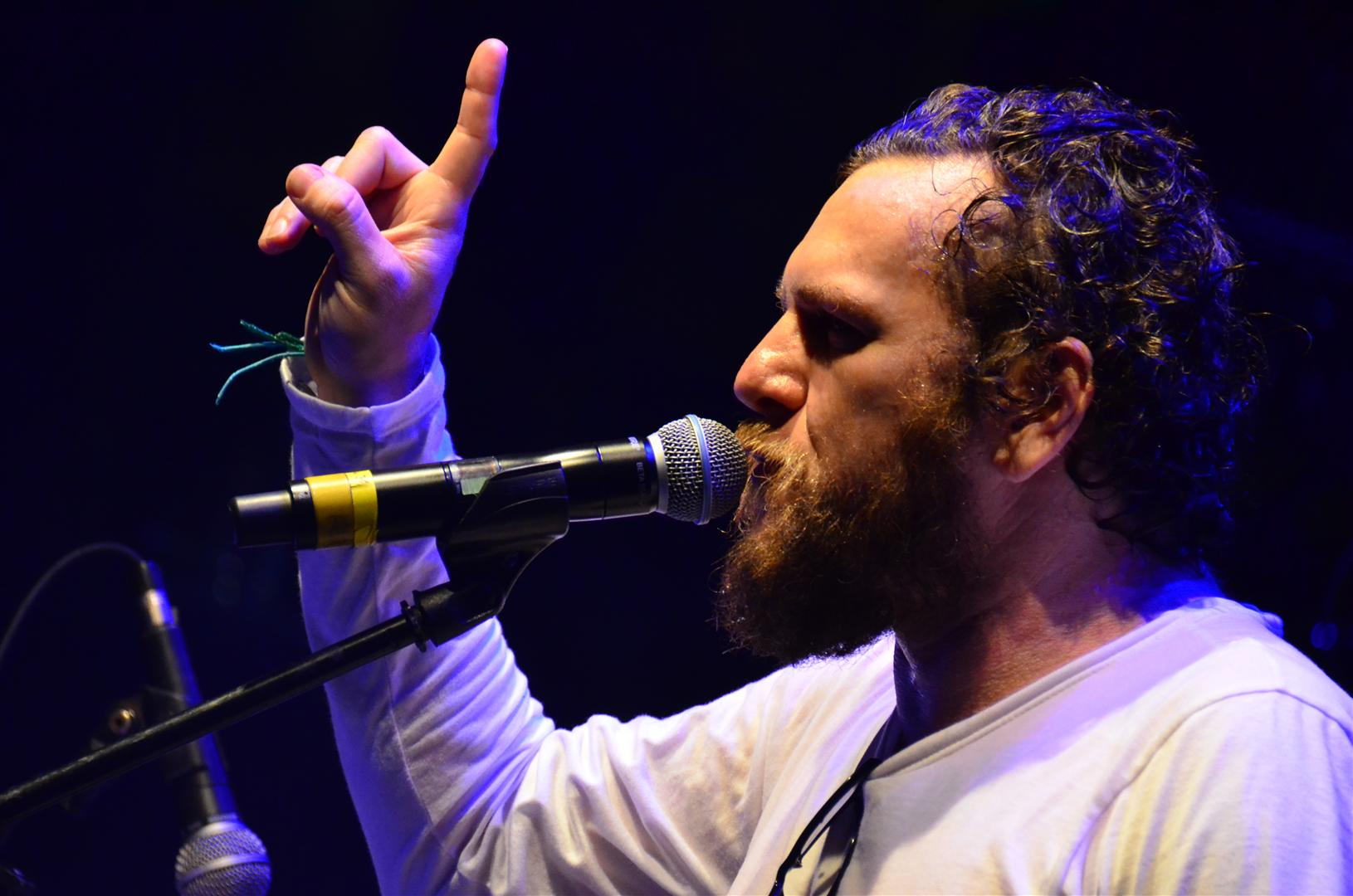
- Otto performing in 2015

Background information
- Born: Otto Maximiliano Pereira de Cordeiro Ferreira; June 28, 1968 (age 58); Belo Jardim, Pernambuco, Brazil
- Genres: Mangue Bit, MPB, rock, electronica
- Occupations: Singer-songwriter, drummer, actor, tv presenter
- Instruments: Vocals, drums
- Years active: 1984–present
- Labels: Trama, Nublu Records, Deckdisc
- Formerly of: Mundo Livre S/A

Otto Maximiliano Pereira de Cordeiro Ferreira (born June 28, 1968), known mononymously as Otto, is a Brazilian singer-songwriter, drummer, and television actor and presenter, famous for being one of the founding members of the pioneering Mangue Bit band Mundo Livre S/A, of which he served as its drummer from 1984 to 1996.

== Early life and career ==
Otto was born in Belo Jardim, Pernambuco, on June 28, 1968, and is of Dutch and Native Brazilian descent. During his early teens he moved to Recife, where he befriended Chico Science and Fred 04; with the latter he would form Mundo Livre S/A, one of the first Mangue Bit bands ever alongside Science's Nação Zumbi. Otto provided drums for Mundo Livre S/A's first two studio albums, until leaving the band in 1996 to pursue a solo career.

In 1998 Otto released his first solo album, Samba pra Burro, through independent record label Trama, which mixed traditional Brazilian genres such as samba and MPB with electronica, drum and bass and rap. Produced by Apollo 9 and counting with guest appearances by Skowa, Bebel Gilberto, former Mundo Livre S/A bandmate Fred 04 and Erasto Vasconcelos (brother of Naná Vasconcelos), it received a good critical reception, and Pro-Música Brasil chose it as the best album of 1998. The album catapulted Otto into nationwide acclaim, later leading him to open shows for bands such as The Prodigy in the same year, and in 1999 he played alongside Tom Zé at the Heineken Concerts in São Paulo. In 2000 a remixed version of Samba pra Burro was released, also through Trama, entitled Changez Tout.

Otto's subsequent album, Condom Black, released in 2001, saw him advancing into a "more organic" sonority, in his words, but without abandoning the electronica influences. As with his previous album, Condom Black was also produced by Apollo 9. In the following year, he collaborated with synthpop band Metrô on their third album, Déjà-Vu; he provided additional vocals for the album's title track.

Also in 2002 he made a contribution to the soundtrack of the critically acclaimed film Mango Yellow (alongside Jorge dü Peixe of Nação Zumbi and Fred 04). The following year saw the release of his third studio album, Sem Gravidade.

in 2005 he made a guest appearance on the pilot episode of the TV series Mandrake as Orlandinho.

In 2009 he released his fourth album, Certa Manhã Acordei de Sonhos Intranquilos, his first not to come out through long-time label Trama. The album's title is an allusion to the opening line of Franz Kafka's 1915 novella The Metamorphosis, and counted with guest appearances by Céu and Julieta Venegas, who later became one of Otto's major collaborators.

His fifth album, The Moon 1111, was released in 2012 through Deckdisc.

Since 2011 he also serves as co-host of the TV program Minha Vida É a Minha Cara, alongside actress Hermila Guedes, which is broadcast by FashionTV Brasil.

In 2015 Otto announced on an interview to the newspaper Folha de S.Paulo that he began work on his sixth album, Ottomatopeia, eventually released on July 28, 2017 through independent label Pomm_elo. It was elected the 14th best Brazilian album of 2017 by the Brazilian edition of Rolling Stone.

== Personal life ==
In 2001 Otto married actress Alessandra Negrini, having with her a daughter, Betina (born 2003). They divorced in 2008. In an interview, he has stated that his divorce from Negrini was a major inspiration for the writing process of Certa Manhã Acordei de Sonhos Intranquilos.

After a short-lived relationship with also actress Mayana Moura, he eventually met Amanda Lira, his current partner. They lived in the bairro of Vidigal, in Rio de Janeiro, until 2016; the couple now resides in São Paulo.

He is a member of the Movimento Humanos Direitos.

== Discography ==
=== Solo ===
==== Studio albums ====
Year	Album
1998	Samba pra Burro: Label: Trama; Format: CD
2001	Condom Black: Label: Trama; Format: CD
2003	Sem Gravidade: Label: Trama; Format: CD
2009	Certa Manhã Acordei de Sonhos Intranquilos: Label: Nublu Records; Format: CD
2012	The Moon 1111: Label: Deckdisc; Format: CD
2017	Ottomatopeia: Label: Pomm_elo; Format: CD, digital download

==== Remix albums ====
Year	Album
2000	Changez Tout: Samba pra Burro Dissecado: Label: Trama; Format: CD

=== With Mundo Livre S/A ===
Year	Album
1994	Samba Esquema Noise: Label: Banguela Records; Format: CD
1996	Guentando a Ôia: Label: Excelente Discos; Format: CD

=== Collaborations ===
Year	Album
2000	Baião de Viramundo: Tributo a Luiz Gonzaga: Label: YB Music; Format: CD; Contributed with the song "Orélia"
2002	Mango Yellow: Original Motion Picture Soundtrack: Label: YB Music; Format: CD; Contributed with the song "Amarelo Manga"
2013	Coitadinha Bem Feito: Label: Joia Moderna; Format: CD; Contributed with the song "Coitadinha Bem Feito"

=== As a session member ===
Metrô

- 2002: Déjà-Vu (additional vocals in "Déjà-Vu")
