= Dany Roland =

Argentine-born Brazilian musician and film director (born 1962)

- Birth name: Daniel David Roland Pinto
- Born: February 9, 1962 (age 63); Buenos Aires, Argentina
- Genres: New wave, synth-pop, alternative rock, MPB
- Occupation(s): Musician, actor, sound designer, film director, record producer
- Instrument(s): Drums, electric guitar
- Years active: 1978–present
- Labels: Epic Records, Adrenaline Records, Trama, Dubas

Daniel David Roland Pinto (born February 9, 1962), known as Dany Roland, is an Argentine-born Brazilian musician, actor, sound designer, film director and record producer, famous for being the drummer of the popular new wave band Metrô and for his collaborations with wife Bia Lessa.

== Biography ==
Roland was born in Buenos Aires, Argentina, on February 9, 1962; his parents were Egyptian Jews of French, Italian and Portuguese descent who emigrated to Argentina from Alexandria in the late 1950s. In 1963 his family moved to São Paulo, Brazil, where after growing up he learned how to play the drums and the electric guitar, and studied Economy and Journalism at the PUC-SP, but did not finish either course.

In 1978 he founded, alongside his schoolmates of the Lycée Pasteur in São Paulo Virginie Boutaud, Freddy and Alec Haiat, Xavier Leblanc, Yann Laouenan and Marcel Zimberg, the experimental/progressive rock band "A Gota Suspensa", which released a self-titled album in 1983; in the following year, A Gota Suspensa changed its name to Metrô, acquiring higher fame. Roland left Metrô in 1987, a couple of months after the release of their second album, A Mão de Mao, to pursue other musical projects; in the following year, Metrô split up. Alongside his former Metrô bandmate Xavier Leblanc Roland briefly played for the experimental rock band Okotô with Cherry Taketani and André Fonseca, and after moving to Brussels, Belgium in the early 1990s with Yann Laouenan, he founded the alternative rock band The Passengers (not to be mistaken with an earlier, also Belgian band formed in the late 1970s which later came to be known as The Names) alongside Diako Diakoff, Denis Moulin and Jack Roskam; they released a fairly successful eponymous album in 1992.

In 1993 Roland returned to Brazil, settling in Rio de Janeiro, where he met film and theater director Bia Lessa, his future wife; he arranged the soundtracks of many of her plays, most notably her adaptations of Virginia Woolf's Orlando, Anton Chekhov's Three Sisters, Robert Musil's The Man Without Qualities and Jules Verne's Journey to the Center of the Earth. In 1997 he co-directed alongside Lessa their first independent full-length film, the critically acclaimed Crede-Mi, which was loosely based on Thomas Mann's 1951 novel The Holy Sinner.

In 2002 Metrô reunited, and Roland returned as their guitarist. The band's comeback album, Déjà-Vu, was produced by him alongside Yann Laouenan. They broke up once more in 2004 however, but announced yet another reunion in 2015. According to Roland, they are currently working on their fourth studio album, but it still has no name or a release date as of yet.

In 2007 Roland formed the musical project Os Ritmistas alongside Stéphane San Juan, Domenico Lancellotti and Zero Telles; they released their first album in the same year. A second album by the project, entitled Aqui, came out 10 years later, in 2017.

In 2010 he made his first major appearance in a feature film, portraying Thomas on Gustavo Pizzi's Craft; he previously made a very brief cameo, alongside his Metrô bandmates, in Francisco de Paula's 1985 film Areias Escaldantes.

In 2016 Roland co-directed, alongside Bia Lessa, their first film since Crede-Mi, Então Morri; it premiered at the Rio de Janeiro International Film Festival.

Prior to acquiring greater prominence as a musician and producer, Roland was well known for portraying the character "Fernandinho" in an iconic series of commercials made by Brazilian clothing brand USTop, which aired from 1984 to 1988.

Roland has two daughters with Bia Lessa: Maria and Clara.

== Discography ==
=== With Metrô ===
Year	Album
1983	A Gota Suspensa: Label: Underground Discos e Artes; Format: Vinyl; Released as A Gota Suspensa
1985	Olhar: Label: Epic Records; Format: Vinyl
1987	A Mão de Mao: Label: Epic Records; Format: Vinyl
2002	Déjà-Vu: Label: Trama; Format: CD

=== With The Passengers ===
Year	Album
1992	The Passengers: Label: Adrenaline Records; Format: CD

=== With Os Ritmistas ===
Year	Album
2007	Os Ritmistas: Label: Dubas; Format: CD
2017	Aqui: Label: Self-released; Format: CD

== Filmography ==
=== As director ===
- 1997: Crede-Mi (co-directed with Bia Lessa)
- 2016: Então Morri (co-directed with Bia Lessa)

=== As actor ===
- 1985: Areias Escaldantes – himself (cameo)
- 2010: Craft – Thomas
