= Lael Rodrigues =

Brazilian filmmaker (1951–1989)

- Born: Lael Alves Rodrigues; November 25, 1951; Campos do Jordão, São Paulo, Brazil
- Died: February 8, 1989 (aged 37); Rio de Janeiro, Rio de Janeiro, Brazil
- Education: Fluminense Federal University
- Occupations: Film director, film producer, film editor, screenwriter
- Years active: 1973–1988
- Children: 1
- Parent(s): Joaquim Rodrigues; Helle Alves

Lael Alves Rodrigues (November 25, 1951 – February 8, 1989) was a Brazilian film director, producer, editor and screenwriter.

== Biography ==
Rodrigues was born in Campos do Jordão, São Paulo, on November 25, 1951, and raised in Caldas, Minas Gerais. He was the son of journalist Joaquim Rodrigues and of Helle Alves, sister of actress Vida Alves. Having a penchant for arts since as a child, Rodrigues went on to study Architecture at the University of Brasília, but did not finish the course; he then moved to Niterói, in Rio de Janeiro, where he graduated in Cinema at the Fluminense Federal University.

His first work was in the 1973 film Vai Trabalhar, Vagabundo!, directed by Hugo Carvana, where he served as assistant director; however, he was not credited. In 1976 he founded alongside Tizuka Yamasaki and Carlos Alberto Diniz a film studio, CPC, which worked on numerous other films by Carvana and Yamasaki's own Parahyba Mulher Macho and Gaijin: Roads to Freedom.

Rodrigues' directorial debut, Bete Balanço, came out in 1984, which he also wrote and starred Débora Bloch and Lauro Corona. It would be followed by 1985's Rock Estrela and 1987's Rádio Pirata. All of his three films were highly successful, particularly among teenagers, and are notable for their rock- and new wave-laden soundtracks containing songs by bands and singers popular at the time, such as Celso Blues Boy, Lobão, Titãs, Barão Vermelho, RPM, Azul 29, Dr. Silvana & Cia., Léo Jaime and Metrô, among others.

Lael died on February 8, 1989, due to a rupture in his esophagus which eventually led to an acute pancreatitis. His last credited work was the 1988 film Super Xuxa contra Baixo Astral, which he executive-produced and starred famous television presenter Xuxa Meneghel. Lael was survived by his son, Luan.

== Filmography ==
=== As director ===
- 1984: Bete Balanço (also wrote)
- 1985: Rock Estrela (also edited)
- 1987: Rádio Pirata (also wrote and produced)

=== As producer ===
- 1980: J. S. Brown, o Último Herói (also edited; directed by José Frazão)
- 1985: Patriamada (directed by Tizuka Yamasaki)
- 1988: Super Xuxa contra Baixo Astral (directed by Anna Penido and David Sonneschein)

=== As editor ===
- 1978: Se Segura, Malandro! (directed by Hugo Carvana)
- 1980: Gaijin: Roads to Freedom (directed by Tizuka Yamasaki)
- 1983: Bar Esperança (directed by Hugo Carvana)
- 1983: Parahyba Mulher Macho (directed by Tizuka Yamasaki)

=== As assistant director ===
- 1973: Vai Trabalhar, Vagabundo! (directed by Hugo Carvana; uncredited)
