= Mais do Mesmo =

Compilation album by Legião Urbana
- Released: 1998
- Recorded: 1984–1996
- Genres: Punk rock, alternative rock
- Length: 69:07
- Label: EMI
- Producer: Mayrton Bahia

Legião Urbana chronology
Uma Outra Estação (1997)	Mais do Mesmo (1998)	Acústico MTV (1999)

Mais do Mesmo (transl. More of the Same) is the second compilation album by Brazilian rock band Legião Urbana. It was released in 1998, two years after vocalist, acoustic guitarist and keyboardist Renato Russo's death and the subsequent end of the band. All songs were extracted from all eight albums of the group, under Marcelo Bonfá's and Dado Villa-Lobos' choices. In Brazil, over a million copies were sold and the album was subsequently certified Diamond by ABPD.

It's the band's first de facto compilation, since the previous one, Música P/ Acampamentos, consisted almost entirely of live recordings. The art project was done by Barrão and Fernanda Villa-Lobos. Mais do Mesmo was the original planned name of their third album, which was ultimately released as Que País É Este.

In the CD booklet, there is a text by journalist and Russo's friend Arthur Dapieve, in which he defines Legião Urbana albums as: "the political Legião Urbana, the lovely Dois, the angry Que País É Este 1978/1987, the religious As Quatro Estações, the shadowy V, the depressed A Tempestade and the redeemer Uma Outra Estação".

== Track listing ==
All tracks are written by Dado Villa-Lobos, Renato Russo and Marcelo Bonfá (1, 9–15) or Russo only (3–8), except where noted

No.	Title	Origin	Length
1.	"Será" (Is It Possible)	Legião Urbana (1984)	2:30
2.	"Ainda É Cedo" (It's Still Early (Villa-Lobos, Russo, Bonfá, Ico Ouro Preto))	Legião Urbana (1984)	3:57
3.	"Geração Coca-Cola" (Coca-Cola Generation)	Legião Urbana (1984)	2:22
4.	"Eduardo e Mônica"	Dois (1986)	4:31
5.	"Tempo Perdido" (Wasted Time)	Dois (1986)	5:02
6.	""Índios"" (Indigenous People)	Dois (1986)	4:17
7.	"Que País É Este?" (What Is This Country?)	Que País É Este (1987)	2:57
8.	"Faroeste Caboclo" (Caboclo Western)	Que País É Este (1987)	9:04
9.	"Há Tempos" (Since Long)	As Quatro Estações (1989)	3:17
10.	"Pais e Filhos" (Parents and Children)	As Quatro Estações (1989)	5:08
11.	"Meninos e Meninas" (Boys and Girls)	As Quatro Estações (1989)	3:23
12.	"Vento no Litoral" (Wind on the Coastline)	V (1991)	6:06
13.	"Perfeição" (Perfection)	O Descobrimento do Brasil (1993)	4:37
14.	"Giz" (Chalk (Russo, Villa-Lobos, Bonfá))	O Descobrimento do Brasil (1993)	3:23
15.	"Dezesseis" (Sixteen)	A Tempestade ou O Livro dos Dias (1996)	5:23
16.	"Antes das Seis" (Before Six (Villa-Lobos, Russo))	Uma Outra Estação (1997)	3:10
Total length:			69:07

== Personnel ==
- Renato Russo - lead vocals, bass guitar, acoustic guitar, keyboards
- Dado Villa-Lobos - guitar, acoustic guitar, bass guitar
- Marcelo Bonfá - drums
- Renato Rocha - bass guitar on tracks 1–8
