= Como É Que Se Diz Eu te Amo =

Live album by Legião Urbana
- Released: 2001
- Recorded: October 8 and 9, 1994
- Genres: Alternative rock, post-punk
- Length: 126:19
- Producers: Rafael Borges, Dado Villa-Lobos and Marcelo Bonfá

Legião Urbana chronology
Acústico MTV (1999)	Como É Que Se Diz Eu te Amo (2001)	As Quatro Estações ao Vivo (2004)

Como É Que Se Diz Eu te Amo (transl. How Does One Say I Love You) is the second live album by Brazilian rock band Legião Urbana, released in 2001. It is the fourth posthumous album by the band after Renato Russo's death in 1996.

It was recorded in Rio de Janeiro, in the former Metropolitan music theater (now called KM de Vantagens Hall) on October 8 and 9, 1994, as part of their O Descobrimento do Brasil promotional tour.

== Background ==
Pirate recordings of the shows were already circulating among fans, which was an additional reason for EMI to release the project. But the album only began to be prepared when journalist Marcelo Froés found the original tapes.

Fóes had been assigned by vocalist, acoustic guitarist and keyboardist Renato Russo's father to investigate his solo and band musical collection. The other members, Dado Villa-Lobos (guitar) and Marcelo Bonfá (drums), also supported his work. By the end of his research, Fróes gathered 83 CD-Rs. Villa-Lobos and Bonfá gave him some additional tapes they had at home and he ended up possessing over 100 copies.

As the compilation was under production, Herbert Vianna, vocalist and guitarist of Os Paralamas do Sucesso, suffered the accident that cost the life of his wife, Lucy Needham Vianna, and also his legs' motor functions. The album was subsequently dedicated to Lucy.

== Track listing ==
Disc 1

No.	Title	Music	Length
1.	"Será" (Is it possible)	Dado Villa-Lobos, Renato Russo and Marcelo Bonfá	2:47
2.	"Eu Sei" (I Know)	Russo	3:25
3.	"La Nuova Gioventú" (The New Youth)	Villa-Lobos and Russo	3:12
4.	"Ainda É Cedo/Gimme Shelter" (It's Still Early)	Ico Ouro Preto, Villa-Lobos, Russo and Bonfá/Mick Jagger and Keith Richards	6:35
5.	"Daniel na Cova dos Leões" (Daniel in the Lions' Den)	Russo and Renato Rocha	3:53
6.	"Vinte e Nove" (Twenty Nine)	Russo	2:03
7.	"Um Dia Perfeito" (A Perfect Day)	Russo	3:02
8.	"Os Anjos" (The Angels)	Villa-Lobos and Russo	2:30
9.	"1965 (Duas Tribos)" (1965 (Two Tribes))	Villa-Lobos, Russo and Bonfá	4:05
10.	"Monte Castelo" (Mount Castle, adapted from passages from 1 Corinthians 13 and a sonnet by Luís Vaz de Camões)	Russo	4:09
11.	"Quando o Sol bater na janela do seu quarto" (When Sunshine Hits Your Bedroom Window)	Villa-Lobos, Russo and Bonfá	4:17
12.	"Geração Coca-Cola" (Coca-Cola Generation)	Russo	2:35
13.	"O Teatro dos Vampiros" (The Theater of the Vampires)	Villa-Lobos, Russo and Bonfá	3:35
14.	"Meninos e Meninas/O Mundo Anda Tão Complicado (citation)" (Boys and Girls/The World's Been So Complicated)	Villa-Lobos, Russo e Bonfá (both songs)	4:02
Total length:			50:10

Disc 2

No.	Title	Music	Length
1.	"Faroeste Caboclo" (Caboclo Western)	Russo	10:26
2.	"Pais e Filhos" (Parents and Children)	Villa-Lobos, Russo and Bonfá	4:41
3.	"Tempo Perdido" (Wasted Time)	Russo	4:10
4.	"Giz" (Chalk)	Villa-Lobos, Russo and Bonfá	3:46
5.	"O Descobrimento do Brasil" (The Discovery of Brazil)	Russo and Bonfá	3:56
6.	"Eduardo e Mônica" (Eduardo and Mônica)	Russo	5:25
7.	"Vento no Litoral" (Wind at the Coastline)	Villa-Lobos, Russo and Bonfá	5:59
8.	"Há Tempos" (Since Long Ago)	Villa-Lobos, Russo and Bonfá	3:00
9.	""Índios"" (Natives)	Russo	4:54
10.	"Perfeição/O Bêbado e a Equilibrista/Lithium/Metal Contra as Nuvens" (Perfection/The Drunk and the Equilibrist/Lithium/Metal Against the Clouds)	Villa-Lobos, Russo and Bonfá/João Bosco and Aldir Blanc/Kurt Cobain, Dave Grohl, Krist Novoselic/Villa-Lobos, Russo and Bonfá	6:59
11.	"Andrea Doria"	Russo, Bonfá, Villa-Lobos	3:04
12.	"Vamos Fazer um Filme" (Let's Make a Movie)	Russo	4:17
13.	"Que País é Este?/Cajuína/Pintinho Amerelinho/Aquele Abraço" (What Country is This?/Cajuína/Yellowy Birdy/That Hug)	Russo/Caetano Veloso/João Plinta and Juca Ramos/Gilberto Gil	3:35
14.	"Metal Contra as Nuvens" (Metal Against the Clouds; hidden track)	Villa-Lobos, Russo and Bonfá	9:58
Total length:			76:09

The song is actually titled "O Bêbado e a Equilibrista", indicating that the equilibrist is a female.

== Personnel ==
Per source:

=== Band ===
- Renato Russo - lead vocals
- Dado Villa-Lobos - guitar
- Marcelo Bonfá - drums and percussion

=== Supporting musicians ===
- Fred Nascimento - electric & acoustic guitar
- Gian Fabra - bass guitar
- Carlos Trilha - keyboards

== References and notes ==
- Fuscaldo, Chris (2016). Discobiografia Legionária. São Paulo: LeYa. ISBN 978-85-441-0481-1.
