= As Quatro Estações ao Vivo =

Live album by Legião Urbana
- Released: March 27, 2004
- Recorded: August 11 and 12, 1990; June 9, 1990 ("Se Fiquei Esperando Meu Amor Passar" only)
- Venues: Palestra Itália Stadium in São Paulo; Mineirinho Gymnasium in Belo Horizonte ("Se Fiquei Esperando Meu Amor Passar" only)
- Genres: Alternative rock, post-punk
- Length: 1:24:08 (total); 51:50 (disc 1); 73:08 (disc 2)
- Label: EMI
- Producer: Dado Villa-Lobos

Legião Urbana chronology
Como é Que Se Diz Eu te Amo (2001)	As Quatro Estações ao Vivo (2004)	Legião Urbana e Paralamas Juntos (2004)

As Quatro Estações ao Vivo is the third live album by Brazilian rock band Legião Urbana, released in 2004. It is the fifth posthumous album by the band following vocalist, acoustic guitarist and keyboardist Renato Russo's death in 1996.

It was recorded in São Paulo, at Palestra Itália Stadium on August 11 and 12, 1990, during their As Quatro Estações tour, except for "Se Fiquei Esperando Meu Amor Passar", recorded at the Mineirinho gymnasium in Belo Horizonte a couple of months before as part of the same tour.

Both shows' audios were recorded straight from the sound table, something new and rare at the time. The tapes were recovered by journalist Marcelo Froés only a decade later and the project was managed by Jorge Davidson, who returned to EMI Music as artistic manager. The living members of the band (Dado Villa-Lobos (guitar) and Marcelo Bonfá (drums), as well as the band's manager Rafael Borges, reunited to direct the creation of the album.

The album was released without Russo's family authorization; his father, also called Renato, died in the middle of production.

== Song and show information ==
During the performances, Russo made several critical comments about then president of Brazil, Fernando Collor de Mello, but most ended up cut from the album. A particular comment was kept on "1965 (Duas Tribos)", one in which he draws subtle criticism towards the Brazilian military dictatorship at the end of "O Reggae" and a critical comment about the then recently started Gulf War at the opening of the album, right before "Fábrica". According to Froés, the family didn't approve of the removal of such comments, since they considered such interaction with the public his most peculiar element on stage.

Before playing "Pais e Filhos", Russo answered to a comment from Paulinho Moska, who had said the day before that "Uma Barata Chamada Kafka" (A Cockroach Called Kafka), a song by his band Inimigos do Rei, was as good as "Pais e Filhos": "[...] this song is dedicated to all the people who think cockroaches are more important than the person we love".

The second disc opens with Russo commanding the band's sound check and ends with ""Índios"", followed by ten minutes of silence and an encore of "Faroeste Caboclo".

== Track listing ==
=== Disc 1 ===
Writing credits per source:

No.	Title	Music	Length
1.	"Fábrica"	Renato Russo	4:30
2.	"Daniel na Cova dos Leões"	Renato Russo, Renato Rocha	3:20
3.	"O Reggae"	Renato Russo and Marcelo Bonfá	5:01
4.	"Há Tempos"	Dado Villa-Lobos, Renato Russo and Marcelo Bonfá	3:00
5.	"Meninos e Meninas"	Dado Villa-Lobos, Renato Russo and Marcelo Bonfá	3:35
6.	"Pais e Filhos/Stand by Me"	Dado Villa-Lobos, Renato Russo and Marcelo Bonfá/Mike Stoller/Jerry Leiber/Ben E. King	6:58
7.	"Maurício/She Loves You"	Dado Villa-Lobos, Renato Russo and Marcelo Bonfá/Lennon/McCartney	3:58
8.	"Feedback Song for a Dying Friend"	Dado Villa-Lobos, Renato Russo and Marcelo Bonfá	4:05
9.	"1965 (Duas Tribos)"	Dado Villa-Lobos, Renato Russo and Marcelo Bonfá	5:14
10.	"Monte Castelo"	Renato Russo	4:28
11.	"Se Fiquei Esperando Meu Amor Passar"	Dado Villa-Lobos, Renato Russo and Marcelo Bonfá	4:37
Total length:			51:50

=== Disc 2 ===
Writing credits per source:

No.	Title	Music	Length
1.	"Ainda É Cedo/Gimme Shelter/Pretty Vacant/(I Can't Get No) Satisfaction/Jumping Jack Flash/Rock Around the Clock/Blue Suede Shoes"	Dado Villa-Lobos, Ico Ouro-Preto, Renato Russo and Marcelo Bonfá/Mick Jagger and Keith Richards/Steve Jones, Glen Matlock, Paul Cook and Johnny Rotten/Mick Jagger and Keith Richards/Mick Jagger and Keith Richards/Jimmy De Knight and Max C. Freedmam/Carl Perkins	9:45
2.	"Geração Coca-Cola"	Renato Russo	2:35
3.	"Eu Sei"	Renato Russo	3:21
4.	"Angra dos Reis"	Renato Russo, Renato Rossa, Marcelo Bonfá	4:44
5.	"Tempo Perdido"	Renato Russo	4:53
6.	"Soldados/Help/Ball and Chain"	Renato Russo and Marcelo Bonfá/Lennon/McCartney/Willie Mae Thornton	9:26
7.	"Quase Sem Querer"	Dado Villa-Lobos, Renato Russo and Renato Rocha	4:05
8.	"Será"	Dado Villa-Lobos, Renato Russo and Marcelo Bonfá	2:49
9.	""Índios"/Faroeste Caboclo"	Renato Russo	28:27
Total length:			73:08

== Personnel ==
=== Legião Urbana ===
- Renato Russo - vocals
- Dado Villa-Lobos - guitars
- Marcelo Bonfá - drums and percussion

=== Supporting musicians ===
- Bruno Araújo - bass guitar
- Fred Nascimento - acoustic guitar
- Mú Carvalho - keyboards

== Sales and certifications ==
Country	Certification
Brazil (Pro-Música Brasil)	Platinum
