= Legião Urbana e Paralamas Juntos =

Live album by Legião Urbana and Os Paralamas do Sucesso
- Released: 2009
- Recorded: 3 September 1988
- Venue: Teatro Fênix
- Genres: Rock, alternative rock, punk rock, ska
- Length: 39:22
- Language: Portuguese
- Label: EMI
- Producers: Carlos Alberto Sion and V. Oliveira

Legião Urbana live album chronology chronology
As Quatro Estações ao Vivo (2006)	Legião Urbana e Paralamas Juntos (2009)	Concerto Sinfônico - Legião Urbana (Ao Vivo no Rock in Rio) (2012)

Os Paralamas do Sucesso live album chronology
Paralamas e Titãs Juntos e Ao Vivo (2008)	Legião Urbana e Paralamas Juntos (2009)	Multishow Ao Vivo: Os Paralamas do Sucesso (2011)

Legião Urbana e Paralamas Juntos is a live album by Brazilian rock bands Legião Urbana and Os Paralamas do Sucesso, recorded on 3 September 1988 at Teatro Fênix during a TV special by Rede Globo but only released in 2009.

== Background and setlist ==
The friendship between both bands comes from before their studio debuts. Os Paralamas do Sucesso had released on their first album (Cinema Mudo) the track "Química", written by Legião Urbana's vocalist, acoustic guitarist and keyboardist Renato Russo. When Jorge Davidson, then international artistic manager of EMI, got to know the song, he became interested in Russo and that paved the way for Legião Urbana's mainstream career.

The idea of having both bands perform together came from producer Carlos Alberto Sion, who at the time was the second-in-command of Roberto Talma, core director of Globo. He believed the channel still wouldn't give Brazilian rock the same attention it was receiving from radio stations, music venues and parties. He already had a relationship with Os Paralamas do Sucesso, after succeeding in taking them to the 1987 Montreux Jazz Festival.

The original project predicted a second show, this time with bands Barão Vermelho and Titãs. The idea was to work with two bands from two labels (Warner Music and EMI Music, but only the latter ended up involved).

It was agreed that the sound mixing would be done by Som Livre, a label that Globo had launched 20 years earlier in order to release soundtracks from its telenovelas. This was done so the sound quality would be kept after being broadcast on television. The images were captured with 2-inch tapes which could only store three songs, causing the show to be paused many times.

Durante the show, Russo and Paralamas' guitarist and vocalist, Herbert Vianna, sung together "Nada por Mim" (a song by Vianna and Paula Toller which was featured on Kid Abelha - Ao Vivo, by Kid Abelha, Toller's main band) and both bands also played "Ainda É Cedo", composed by Legião's members (Dado Villa-Lobos, Renato Russo and Marcelo Bonfá) and Ico Ouro Preto, and the performance continued into a rendition of "Jupin' Jack Flash", by The Rolling Stones. During the rest of the show, the bands took turns on stage.

== 2009 release ==
EMI Music decided to release the show in CD and DVD in 2009 with enhanced images and audio, which was made possible following a restoration work. The DVD contains bonus material such as testimonials by Bussunda, Tony Ramos, Cláudia Abreu, Stepan Nercessian, Carlos Lombardi and Fernando Gabeira, besides comments by Russo and Vianna.

== Track listing ==
Writing credits per source:

CD
No.	Title	Writer(s)	Length
1.	"Será"	Dado Villa-Lobos; Renato Russo; Marcelo Bonfá	2:33
2.	"Meu Erro"	Herbert Vianna	3:27
3.	"Tédio (Com Um T Bem Grande Pra Você)"	Russo	2:32
4.	"Depois Que o Ilê Passar"	Milton Souza de Jesus	0:52
5.	"Tempo Perdido"	Russo	3:57
6.	"Alagados"	Bi Ribeiro; João Barone; Vianna	6:27
7.	"O Beco"	Bi Ribeiro; Vianna	2:50
8.	"Que Pais É Este"	Russo	3:10
9.	"Nada Por Mim"	Vianna	2:17
10.	"Dois Elefantes"	Vianna	4:22
11.	"Eu Sei"	Russo	3:10
12.	"Ainda É Cedo/Jumpin' Jack Flash"	Villa-Lobos; Russo; Bonfá; Ico Ouro-Preto / Keith Richards; Mick Jagger	3:45
Total length:			39:22

DVD
No.	Title	Writer(s)	Length
1.	"Purple Haze / Ska / Get Back"	Jimi Hendrix / Vianna / Lennon & McCartney
2.	"Será"	Villa-Lobos; Russo; Bonfá	2:33
3.	"Meu Erro"	Vianna	3:27
4.	"Tédio (Com Um T Bem Grande Pra Você)"	Russo	2:32
5.	"Depois Que o Ilê Passar"	Milton Souza de Jesus	0:52
6.	"Tempo Perdido"	Russo	3:57
7.	"Alagados"	Bi Ribeiro; João Barone; Vianna	6:27
8.	"O Beco"	Bi Ribeiro; Vianna	2:50
9.	"Que Pais É Este"	Russo	3:10
10.	"Nada Por Mim"	Vianna	2:17
11.	"Dois Elefantes"	Vianna	4:22
12.	"Eu Sei"	Russo	3:10
13.	"Ainda É Cedo / Jumpin' Jack Flash"	Villa-Lobos; Russo; Bonfá; Ico Ouro-Preto / Keith Richards; Mick Jagger	3:45
