= Acústico MTV: Legião Urbana =

Acústico MTV

Live album (acoustic) by Legião Urbana
- Released: October 27, 1999
- Recorded: January 28, 1992
- Venue: Cine Haway
- Genres: Alternative rock, acoustic rock
- Length: 74:30
- Label: EMI
- Producer: Legião Urbana

Legião Urbana chronology
Mais do Mesmo (1998)	Acústico MTV (1999)	Como é Que Se Diz Eu te Amo (2001)

Professional ratings
Review scores
Source	Rating
Allmusic	4/5 stars

Acústico MTV is the first live album by Brazilian band Legião Urbana. It was certified Diamond by ABPD, with more than 500,000 copies sold, and eventually reached the milestone of over 2 million copies sold.

== Background and preparation ==
In the early 1990s, the band was approached by MTV, then recently established in Brazil, and asked to record some songs for a special program. Back then, it wasn't in the plans to release the material as CD or VHS, as it happened — indeed, the show was recorded in 1992 but only released in 1999.

The negotiations for the performance took a while. The original idea was to prepare a video to promote their then new album V, but due to the group's reluctance, the offer was changed to a MTV Unplugged presentation. The idea was cancelled and redone over ten times, due in part to the fact that the band wanted to be informed about the project's every detail.

It was the second program of the series MTV Unplugged in Brazil, the first having been with the Rio de Janeiro band Barão Vermelho. The show happened at Cine Haway, a deactivated movie theater, on 28 January 1992. The channel's headquarters sent and extensive material about how the stage and the program as a whole should be set.

The band struggled to adapt to the unplugged format. They always cared little for the tuning of their instruments and to many technical aspects in general, and now they saw themselves in a presentation that required much attention to the volume of the instruments and the performances on them. Drummer Marcelo Bonfá, for example, refused to switch his drum sticks for rutes. The band also didn't think their music would work in acoustic arrangements.

In 1997, amid the release of the posthumous solo album O Último Solo by vocalist and acoustic guitarist Renato Russo, EMI artistic manager João August already expressed the possibility of releasing the show on CD, stating two hours had been recorded but only 50 minutes were broadcast.

== The show ==
Uncertainties on the project persisted until the very day of the performance. At the time of the show, Russo was at the hotel, apparently refusing to go play. But Rogério Gallo, then MTV manager, later stated it was just a misunderstanding and Russo was actually just willing to clarify something about the repertoire.

The audience was instructed not to get too excited during the show, given its intimate nature. Reginaldo Ferreira, a fan later turned roadie, said models were hired to stand in front of the stage and keep the fans in the distance, but Gallo denied it.

The repertoire is composed of songs from the band's early albums such as ""Índios"", "Pais e Filhos", "Eu Sei", "Há Tempos", "Baader-Meinhof Blues" and "Faroeste Caboclo"; songs from the then new album, such as "Sereníssima", "Teatro dos Vampiros" and "Metal Contra as Nuvens"; and English-language covers such as "On the Way Home" (Neil Young with Buffalo Springfield), "Rise" (by Public Image Ltd), "Head On" (The Jesus and Mary Chain) and "The Last Time I Saw Richard" (Joni Mitchell).

The main single is "Hoje a Noite Não Tem Luar" (Portuguese-language cover of "Hoy Me Voy Para México" (by Puerto Rican boy band Menudo) created by Carlos Colla). In a break requested by the production team in order to change the recording tapes, Russo jokingly said he would play the song, and the joke became a hit with heavy airplay in 1999.

Some songs of the album had already been released on Música P/ Acampamentos in 1992.

In one week, the album sold 750,000 copies and was certified double platinum.

== Track listing ==
CD and DVD tracks (writing credits per source:)
No.	Title	Writer(s)	English title	Length
1.	"Baader-Meinhof Blues"	Dado Villa-Lobos; Marcelo Bonfá; Renato Russo		5:03
2.	""Índios""	Russo	Indigenous People	5:28
3.	"Mais do Mesmo"	Villa-Lobos; Bonfá; Russo; Renato Rocha	More of the Same	4:24
4.	"Pais e Filhos"	Villa-Lobos; Russo; Bonfá	Parents and Children	6:19
5.	"Hoje a Noite Não Tem Luar" (version by Carlos Colla)	Alejandro Monroy Fernandez; Carlos Villa de La Torre	Tonight There's No Moon	4:31
6.	"Sereníssima"	Villa-Lobos; Russo; Bonfá	Very Serene	4:57
7.	"O Teatro dos Vampiros"	Villa-Lobos; Russo; Bonfá	Theater of Vampires	5:36
8.	"On the Way Home/Rise"	Neil Young / John Lydon; William Laswell		6:50
9.	"Head On"	William Reid; James Reid		2:49
10.	"The Last Time I Saw Richard"	Joni Mitchell		3:39
11.	"Metal contra as Nuvens"	Villa-Lobos; Russo; Bonfá	Metal Against the Clouds	9:21
12.	"Há Tempos"	Villa-Lobos; Russo; Bonfá	For Long	3:45
13.	"Eu Sei"	Russo	I Know	3:55
14.	"Faroeste Caboclo"	Russo	Caboclo Western	9:53
Total length:

== Personnel ==
- Renato Russo — lead vocals, acoustic guitar
- Dado Villa-Lobos — acoustic guitar
- Marcelo Bonfá — drums, percussion

=== Technical personnel ===
Adapted from the booklet:

- Legião Urbana — production
- Torcuato Mariano — artistic management
- Rafael Borges — executive production, production management
- Pena Schmidt — recording coordination
- Carlos Aru — recording technician
- Egídio Conde — recording technician, audio supervision
- Moogie Canazio — mixing engineer
- Bernie Grundman — masterization
- Luiz Tornaghi e Moogie Canazio — edition
- Barrão e Fernanda Villa-Lobos — graphic project
- Adriana Trigona — graphic coordination
- César Itiberê — cover picture
- Franklin Garrido — PA operation
- Maneco Quinderé — light creation and operation
- Bruno Maciel — roadie

MTV team (original version)

- Adriano Goldman — direction
- Pedro Bueno — executive production
- Carol Maluf, Daniela Gebaile and Ivan Santos — artistic relations
- Celso Tavares — operations/production management
- Marcelo Machado and Rogério Gallo — general direction

MTV team (special version)

- Paulo Marchetti — post-production management
- Rodrigo Carelli — specials supervision
- Miguel Lopes — operations supervision
- Valter Pascotto — technical direction
- Anna Butler — artistic relations director
- Cris Lobo e Zico Góes — program and production direction
- André Mantovani — general direction

== Sales and certifications ==
Country	Certifications	Sales/Copis
CD
Brazil (ABPD)	Diamond	1.500.000+
^ sales based on circulation numbers * certification based on circulation numbers ~ sales based on the certification value
