= Duetos (Renato Russo album) =

Compilation album by Renato Russo
- Released: March 27, 2010
- Recorded: 1984–95, 1999, 2009
- Genre: Rock, pop rock, folk
- Length: 56:32
- Language: Portuguese, English, Italian
- Label: EMI

Renato Russo chronology
O Trovador Solitário (2008)	Duetos (2010)	Novo Milênio (2014)

Singles from Duetos
- 1. "Like a Lover"

Duetos (English: Duets; also known as Renato Russo: Duetos) is an album by Brazilian singer-songwriter Renato Russo released on 27 March 2010 to celebrate his would-be 50th anniversary.

As the name suggests, the album is exclusively composed of duets of Russo and another artist. Some duets did truly happen, but not all were previously released; others were created by combining Russo's recordings with other singers' recordings.

== Background and curation ==
The album was conceived by journalist and producer Marcelo Fróes (with permission from Russo's family) and it was done mainly with tapes from Russo's first two albums, The Stonewall Celebration Concert and Equilíbrio Distante. "Vento no Litoral" and "Celeste", which would later become "Soul Parsifal", are the only ones from the repertoire of Legião Urbana, the band in which Russo sang and played. Some parts were also recorded during the band's V album sessions. A total of 25 tapes were used. The musicians who recorded their parts especially for the album (Caetano Veloso, Célia Porto (who released a Renato Russo cover album on the following year of his death), Fernanda Takai, Laura Pausini and Leila Pinheiro) did so in November 2009.

The artists were selected based on some "affection relationship" with Russo. All of them were contacted to negotiate the duets, except for Cássia Eller and Dorival Caymmi, who were already dead and were represented by their families.

== Content ==
Marcelo Fróes said I couldn't miss it because it was publicly known that Renato [Russo] was a Pato [Fu] fan. [...] Honestly, I had some reservations about these things done posthumously. But Froés said his voice had quality and we could build a new arrangement. [...] I went to studio and tried to be light in this moment. I pretended he was alive and recorded it based on good memories, on the conversations we had about our spiritualties... I obeyed the tone and registered parts that weren't good for my voice doing backing vocals for him. I thought the result was natural.

— Fernanda Takai about her performance on "Like a Lover"

The first track, "Like a Lover", a duet with Fernanda Takai (Pato Fu), was released as a single and is an English-language version of "O Cantador" (The Singer), a song by Sérgio Mendes composed by Dori Caymmi and Nelson Motta. Russo's parts were recorded during the Equilíbrio Distante sessions (another source says it was during The Stonewall Celebration Concert sessions). He effectively sings some parts but only hums others – it was on these sections that Takai's voice was added.

Fróes convinced Takai to enter the project after mentioning how much of a fan Russo was of Pato Fu. The singer met Russo along with the other band members after a Legião Urbana show in Belo Horizonte in 1994. Russo gave her his phone number but, out of shyness, she only called him two years later, when the singer was already weakened from AIDS.

"Celeste" was recorded in 1993 during pre-production of the album Verde, Anil, Amarelo, Cor-de-Rosa e Carvão, by Marisa Monte, and during a break from The Stonewall Celebration Concert sessions. The recording was kept on a DAT tape until Monte looked for Carlos Trilha (keyboardist and Russo's solo albums producer) to try and finish the song according to what they both wanted by the time of its recording. She took the initiative after Fróes contacted her about the duet, which she accepted on the condition that the original recording was used instead of a new version recorded by her.

The recovery work was long and difficult, being finished only after three months (another source says it took 30 days). The final version involved musicians such as Fred Nascimento (guitar), Gian Fabra (bass) and Cesinha (drums), among others. Monte used her own voice to outline a string arrangement that was later written by violinist Pedro Mibielli, who performed it along with cellist Hugo Pilger. Monte kept her original vocals, but she added backing vocals on the new version, which features a section of the original recording in the end.

"Celeste" was released under another name ("Soul Parsifal") and more negative lyrics in 1996 on the Legião Urbana album A Tempestade ou O Livro dos Dias, the last one released in Russo's lifetime. Both tracks were released as two different phonograms by EMI Music Publishing.

"Vento no Litoral" is one of the manufactured duets. A 1991 Russo recording and a 1999 Cássia Eller recording were used with an instrumental produced by Clemente Magalhães. Eller's voice was recorded in a Renato Russo tribute show that took place on 15 December at the Metropolitan. She was no longer alive either when the duet came out.

Caetano Veloso went to studio to record his part for "Change Partners" (also produced by Magalhães) while Laura Pausini received a file with Russo's voice via internet and, after two days, she returned the material with her contributions.

"Esquadros" and "Só Louco" (respectively co-sung by Adriana Calcanhotto and Dorival Caymmi; Russo was a big fan of the latter)) were extracted from a television program by José Maurício Machline titled Por Acaso and aired in 1994. The program also featured a second duet with Calcanhotto, "Agora Só Falta Você", but it wasn't used on the album.

Some songs had already been released on solo albums by Russo or on albums by other artists. "Mais Uma Vez", "A Carta", "A Cruz e a Espada", "Cathedral Song / Catedral" and "Summertime" were featured on Presente and also in albums by some of the involved artists. "Nada Por Mim" is from the album Legião Urbana e Paralamas Juntos.

== Track list ==
No.	Title	Writer(s)	English title	Length
1.	"Like a Lover / O Cantador" (guest: Fernanda Takai)	Dori Caymmi, Nelson Motta (versão: Allan Bergman, Marilyn Bergman)	Like a Lover / The Singer	4:23
2.	"Celeste (Note: "Celeste" refers to a blue sky and can also be a female name)" (guest: Marisa Monte)	Renato Russo, Marisa Monte		6:28
3.	"Vento no Litoral" (guest: Cássia Eller)	Renato, Marcelo Bonfá, Dado Villa-Lobos	Wind on the Coastline	5:54
4.	"Mais uma Vez" (guest: 14 Bis)	Flávio Venturini, Renato	Once Again	1:35
5.	"A Carta" (guest: Erasmo Carlos)	Benil Santos, Raul Sampaio	The Letter	4:01
6.	"A Cruz e a Espada" (guest: Paulo Ricardo)	Paulo Ricardo, Luiz Schiavon	The Cross and the Sword	3:10
7.	"Cathedral Song / Catedral" (guest: Zélia Duncan)	Tanita Tikaram (version: Christiaan Oyens, Zélia Duncan		2:57
8.	"Change Partners" (guest: Caetano Veloso)	Irving Berlin		3:47
9.	"Strani Amori" (guest: Laura Pausini)	Roberto Buti, Cheope, Marco Marati, Angelo Valsiglio	Strange Loves	4:24
10.	"La Solitudine" (guest: Leila Pinheiro)	Pietro Cremonesi, Angelo, Federico Cavalli	The Loneliness	4:12
11.	"Come Fa Un'Onda" (guest: Célia Porto)	Nelson Motta, Lulu Santos (version: Massimiliano de Tomassi)	Like a Wave	3:25
12.	"Só Louco" (guest: Dorival Caymmi)	Dorival Caymmi	Just Crazy People	3:24
13.	"Esquadros" (guest: Adriana Calcanhotto)	Adriana Calcanhotto	Set-Squares	2:44
14.	"Nada por Mim" (guest: Herbert Vianna)	Herbert Vianna, Paula Toller	Nothing for Me	2:15
15.	"Summertime" (guest: Cida Moreira)	George Gershwin, Du Bose Heyward, Ira Gershwin		3:53
Total length:				56:32
