= Música P/ Acampamentos =

Compilation album by Legião Urbana
- Released: 1992
- Recorded: Various
- Genre: Post-punk
- Length: 90:20
- Label: EMI-Odeon
- Producer: Mayrton Bahia

Legião Urbana chronology
V (1991)	Música P/ Acampamentos (1992)	O Descobrimento do Brasil (1993)

Música P/ Acampamentos (transl. Music For Camping) is a double live compilation by Brazilian rock band Legião Urbana. Released in 1992, it consists of previously unreleased live recordings by the band and one previously unreleased studio song: "A Canção do Senhor da Guerra".

== Background and curation ==
The band had always been reluctant about releasing a compilation, which culminated in the members' feud with label EMI-Odeon when it tried to edit a compilation without talking to them first.

The album would only come out their way, and ended up being produced in a rather timely occasion, since the previous studio album V tour had been prematurely aborted and the members looked for ways to earn money while vocalist, acoustic guitarist and keyboardist Renato Russo searched for help to get rid of drugs. Meanwhile, they wanted to offer something less commercial sounding to fans, in order to compensate for the cancellation of so many shows, and that's when they decided to gather live recordings, almost all of which were previously unreleased.

The songs were recorded during lives performances at Parque Antártica Stadium, in São Paulo, in August 1990; in Morro da Urca, Rio de Janeiro, in August 1986; some sessions at radio stations Transamérica FM (Rio de Janeiro), in 1988 and 1992 and Rádio Cidade (Rio de Janeiro), in 1992; and the band's Acústico MTV album, in 1992. The booklet says all tracks (except "A Canção do Senhor da Guerra" and "Mais do Mesmo") were recorded in only one take and that the original tapes were not enhanced, except for edits, mixes and sound filtering.

The art project was done by Fernanda Villa-Lobos and Gualter Pupo, and the album cover was drawn by drummer Marcelo Bonfá. It was mixed in November 1992. Former bassist Renato Rocha and touring musicians are also featured. Russo and guitarist Dado Villa-Lobos agreed that the album summed up the history of the band appropriately, since it covered all lineups.

== "A Canção do Senhor da Guerra" ==
The only studio track of the album is "A Canção do Senhor da Guerra" (The Song of the Lord of War). Originally, it was simply titled "O Senhor da Guerra" (The Lord of War) and was featured in an album from A Era dos Halley, a Rede Globo children special aired from November 1985 to May 1986. The band guest starred in one of the episodes, performing the song to the characters and wearing medieval clothes. The album was produced by Guto Graça Mello and featured performances by Tim Maia, Roupa Nova, Baby Consuelo, Sempre Livre, Rosana and Guilherme Lamounier, Titãs, Sérgio Dias, Txã and Gabriela.

This album's version is different, not only in the title, but also in the fact that it was entirely recorded by Russo, who played all instruments over an electronic drum set.

A rare interview with Raul Seixas that circulates on the Internet suggests that the song had originally been requested to him. He says he had just created a new song with Lena Coutinho and that he would take it to Rio de Janeiro the following day. "I will be the 'Lord of War'", he said. It's not known why Legião Urbana's version was ultimately chosen over his.

== Track listing ==
Disc 1: 1-10 tracks / Disc 2: 11-20 tracks
#	Title	Writer	Origin	Length
1	Fábrica	Renato Russo	Show at Parque Antártica in 1990	4:10
2	Daniel na Cova dos Leões	Renato Russo, Renato Rocha	Show at Parque Antártica in 1990	3:18
3	A Canção do Senhor da Guerra	Renato Russo	Demo 1984-85	4:57
4	O Teatro dos Vampiros	Renato Russo, Dado Villa-Lobos, Marcelo Bonfá	Acústico MTV	4:05
5	Ainda É Cedo	Renato Russo, Dado Villa-Lobos, Marcelo Bonfá, Ico Ouro Preto	Live in Morro da Urca in 1986	3:35
6	Gimme Shelter	Mick Jagger, Keith Richards	Live in Morro da Urca in 1986	2:48
7	Baader-Meinhof Blues	Renato Russo, Dado Villa-Lobos, Marcelo Bonfá	Live at Rádio Transámerica in 1988	4:59
8	A Montanha Mágica You've Lost That Loving Feeling Jealous Guy Ticket to Ride	Renato Russo, Dado Villa-Lobos, Marcelo Bonfá Barry Mann, Cynthia Weil, Phil Spector John Lennon John Lennon, Paul McCartney	Live at Rádio Transámerica in 1992	10:03
9	Eu Sei	Renato Russo	Acústico MTV outtake	2:59
10	"Índios"	Renato Russo	Acústico MTV	4:57
11	A Dança	Renato Russo, Dado Villa-Lobos, Marcelo Bonfá	Live at Rádio Transámerica in 1992	3:44
12	Mais do Mesmo	Renato Russo, Renato Rocha, Dado Villa-Lobos, Marcelo Bonfá	Acústico MTV outtake	3:32
13	Soldados Blues da Piedade Faz Parte Do Meu Show Nascente	Renato Russo, Marcelo Bonfá Cazuza, Roberto Frejat Cazuza, Renato Ladeira Flávio Venturini, Murilo Antunes	Show at Parque Antártica in 1990	7:55
14	Música Urbana 2	Renato Russo	Live at Radio Cidade 1992	3:17
15	On the Way Home	Neil Young	Acústico MTV outtake	2:44
16	Maurício	Renato Russo, Dado Villa-Lobos, Marcelo Bonfá	Show at Parque Antártica in 1990	3:09
17	Há Tempos	Renato Russo, Dado Villa-Lobos, Marcelo Bonfá	Show at Parque Antártica in 1990	3:03
18	Pais E Filhos Stand By Me	Renato Russo, Dado Villa-Lobos, Marcelo Bonfá Ben E. King, Jerry Leiber and Mike Stoller	Show at Parque Antártica in 1990	6:39
19	Faroeste Caboclo	Renato Russo	Show at Parque Antártica in 1990	9:20
20	Rhapsody in Blue (exit music)	George Gershwin		1:06

== Personnel ==
=== Legião Urbana ===
- Renato Russo: lead vocals, acoustic guitar
- Dado Villa-Lobos: guitar
- Marcelo Bonfá: drums
- Renato Rocha: bass guitar ("Ainda É Cedo" and "Baader-Meinhof Blues")

=== Touring musicians (São Paulo) ===
- Fred Nascimento: acoustic guitar
- Bruno Araújo: bass guitar
- Mú Carvalho: keyboards

=== Touring musicians (Rio de Janeiro) ===
- Sérgio Serra: acoustic and electric guitar
- Tavinho Fialho: bass guitar
- Carlos Trilha: keyboards
