= Angra dos Reis (song) =

1988 song by Legião Urbana

Single by Legião Urbana

from the album Que País É Este
- Released: 27 May 1988
- Recorded: 1986
- Genre: Alternative rock
- Length: 4:58
- Label: EMI-Odeon
- Songwriters: Renato Russo, Renato Rocha, Marcelo Bonfá
- Producer: Mayrton Bahia

Legião Urbana singles chronology
"Que País É Este" (1987)	"Angra dos Reis" (1988)	"Faroeste Caboclo" (1988)

Music video
- "Angra dos Reis" on YouTube

"Angra dos Reis" is a song written by Renato Russo, Renato Rocha and Marcelo Bonfá and released in 1987 on the album Que País É Este 1978/1987 by their band Legião Urbana. It was also released in 1988 as the second single off the album.

== Background and writing ==
The melody was composed by drummer Marcelo Bonfá on the piano when they still thought Que País É Este would be composed of all-new material. Producer Mayrton Bahia recovered the sound and asked Russo to write some lyrics for it, so that the album contained at least one new tune. Russo initially refused and Bahia threatened to not finish the album. On the following day, Russo came back to the studio with the lyrics written on a wrinkled piece of paper.

Russo was an opposer of the construction of the Central Nuclear Almirante Álvaro Alberto in the city of the song title. During a 1990 show in Porto Alegre/RS, Russo said: "The indigenous name of the place where they built our nuclear power plant is 'soft land'. The indigenous people already knew that anything you build there will sink! No applauding people, we have to boo this!", in reference to Itaorna Beach, where the facility was built.

== Music video ==
The song video shows the members in Angra dos Reis: Marcelo Bonfá in a schooner on the shore or drawing next to the power plant; Renato Russo trying to write the lyrics to the song in a typing machine or singing next to the place; and Renato Rocha riding a bike around the city. Dado Villa-Lobos had his parts recorded in Rio de Janeiro, since his child was about to be born; a brief shot of his wife Fernanda's ultrasound is shown. Later, the images alternate between Bonfá watching a movie on the television and all four members having coffee at a diner.

By the end of the video, the song is over and Bonfá is seen watching images of the power plant with a female voice stating: "The danger is over. The technicians have already been called. There's no reason to be alarmed. We'll take the necessary measures. We are on your side".

== Tracks ==
12" PROMO (EMI 9951 075)

All tracks are written by Renato Russo, Renato Rocha, Marcelo Bonfá.

Side A
No.	Title	Length
1.	"Angra dos Reis"	4:58

Side B
No.	Title	Length
2.	"Angra dos Reis"	4:58
Total length:		9:56
