= Uma Outra Estação =

Studio album by Legião Urbana
- Released: July 18, 1997
- Recorded: AR Records, Rio de Janeiro City; 1996-1997
- Genres: Alternative rock; art rock
- Length: 60:22
- Label: EMI
- Producers: Legião Urbana; Tom Capone

Legião Urbana chronology
A Tempestade ou O Livro dos Dias (1996)	Uma Outra Estação (1997)	Mais do Mesmo (1998)

Singles from Uma Outra Estação
- 1. "As Flores do Mal" Released: 1997

Uma Outra Estação (transl. A Different Season) is the eighth and final studio album by Brazilian rock band Legião Urbana. Released in July 1997, nine months after Renato Russo's death, it sold over 250,000 copies and received a Platinum Certification by Pro-Música Brasil.

== Background ==
On 22 October 1996, eleven days after the death of vocalist, acoustic guitarist and keyboardist Renato Russo, guitarist Dado Villa-Lobos, drummer Marcelo Bonfá and EMI Music artistic manager João Augusto announced the end of Legião Urbana, which still owed three albums to the label.

In March of the following year, Villa-Lobos decided to work on songs that were left out of the previous album, A Tempestade ou O Livro dos Dias. 28 tracks were recorded, but only 15 made it to the final record. The guitarist signed the production with Tom Capone, who had already helped the band record the previous album, when he was the manager of AR Estúdios, although he wasn't credited.

== Song information ==
The first track, "Riding Song", features the band's former bassist, Renato Rocha, who was a member from 1984 to 1989. The lyrics contain only two verses: "Eu já sei o que eu vou ser / Ser quando crescer" (I already know what I am going to be / To be when I grow up"), written and sung by Villa-Lobos. It contains a few sections of an interview from the Dois album, in which the four members (including Rocha) introduce themselves.

"La Maison Dieu" speaks about the atrocities committed during the military dictatorship period of Brazil.

The previous album's title track was only featured on this one. Other songs previously rejected include "Clarisse", also created for the previous album and telling the story of a 16-year-old girl who slits her own wrists with a switchblade locked in the bathroom. It was deemed too dark back then. Another example is "Dado Viciado", created in the band's early times and dealing with the transformation that a heroin addict experiences, but rejected out of fear that people would think it referred to Dado Villa-Lobos.

The ending track, "Travessia do Eixão", is the only one (along with instrumentals "Schubert Ländler" and "High Noon (Do Not Forsake Me)") not composed by the band. It has a guest appearance by Os Paralamas do Sucesso's bassist Bi Ribeiro. He played acoustic bass on it and on "Antes das Seis".

"Schubert Ländler" is an instrumental jingle composed by Franz Schubert, and performed by Carlos Trilha, being the shortest track ever by the band at 1:09. This version was chosen by Russo after dozens of takes. Trilha went to the National Library of Brazil to obtain a copy of the song's sheet music and he never understood why Russo wanted him to play it.

"Sagrado Coração", despite having its lyrics displayed in the booklet, contains no vocals, since Russo wouldn't live to record his part. It was co-composed by Trilha (who cried after listening the final version without Russo's voice), but his co-authorship was only recognized by Russo's family in 2009, after a fan of Russo sent Trilha an informal interview with Russo done by journalist Marcelo Fróes, in which he says he did the song with Trilha.

In October 2010, the album was re-released in a special box set and also in vinyl. This edition brings a modified booklet and some texts by journalist Christina Fuscaldo, written with help from all musicians involved in the production of the band's eight albums.

The main songs played on the radio were "Flores do Mal", "Antes das Seis" and, to a lesser extent, "Marcianos Invadem a Terra". This last one was created during Russo's "Trovador Solitário" (Solitary Troubadour) era and was only recorded in studio in 1993, when Dinho Ouro Preto (Capital Inicial) recorded his second, self-titled solo album.

== Artwork and booklet ==
The cover of the album features a drawing by Bonfá inspired by Brasília, where the band was formed.

The booklet's first page had the sentence: "Listen to this album from the first track to the last one. This is the story of our lives". The penultimate page had a list of institutions and the message: "Feel good contributing to the following institutions which need your help". The booklet also featured the returning sentence Urbana Legio Omnia Vincii ("Legião Urbana wins everything", in Latin), which was featured in all albums by the band except for A Tempestade ou O Livro dos Dias.

== Track listing ==
All lyrics are written by Renato Russo, except "Riding Song" (Dado Villa-Lobos) & "Travessia Do Eixão" (Nicolas Behr).

No.	Title	Music	English title	Length
1.	"Riding Song"	Villa-Lobos, Russo, Marcelo Bonfá		3:02
2.	"Uma Outra Estação"	Villa-Lobos, Russo, Bonfá	Another Station	3:58
3.	"As Flores Do Mal"	Villa-Lobos, Russo, Bonfá	The Flowers Of Evil	4:32
4.	"La Maison Dieu"	Villa-Lobos, Russo, Bonfá	The House Of God	6:53
5.	"Clarisse"	Villa-Lobos, Russo, Bonfá		10:32
6.	"Schubert Ländler" (Instrumental)	Franz Schubert		1:09
7.	"A Tempestade"	Villa-Lobos, Russo, Bonfá	The Storm	4:14
8.	"High Noon (Do Not Forsake Me)" (Instrumental)	Dimitri Tiomkin, Ned Washington		1:29
9.	"Comédia Romântica"	Villa-Lobos, Russo, Bonfá	Romantic Comedy	2:55
10.	"Dado Viciado"	Russo	Drug-Addicted Dado (a pun on the term for "Loaded Dice")	2:32
11.	"Marcianos Invadem A Terra"	Russo	Martians Invade Earth	2:36
12.	"Antes Das Seis"	Villa-Lobos, Russo	Before 6 O'Clock	3:10
13.	"Mariane"	Russo		3:15
14.	"Sagrado Coração"	Russo, Carlos Trilha	Sacred Heart	6:29
15.	"Travessia Do Eixão"	Nonato Veras	Crossing Of The Eixão	3:36
Total length:				60:22

== Personnel ==
Legião Urbana

- Renato Russo — lead vocals, bass guitar, acoustic guitar, keyboards
- Dado Villa-Lobos — electric guitar, craviola, harmonica, dobro, mandolin, percussion, vocals
- Marcelo Bonfá — drums, ocarina, percussion, vocals

Additional personnel

- Carlos Trilha — Hammond organ, piano, programming
- Renato Rocha — bass guitar (on "Riding Song")
- Tom Capone — lead guitar (on "La Maison Dieu"), slide guitar (on "Antes das Seis"), percussion and vocals (on "Travessia do Eixão")
- Bi Ribeiro — acoustic bass (on "Travessia do Eixão" and "Antes das Seis")

== Sales and certifications ==
Country	Certification	Sales
Brazil (Pro-Música Brasil)	Platinum	300.000+
