= O Trovador Solitário =

Compilation album by Renato Russo
- Released: July 13, 2008
- Recorded: 1978, 1982, 1985
- Genre: Acoustic rock
- Length: 34:35
- Languages: Portuguese, English
- Label: Discobertas/Coqueiro Verde

Renato Russo chronology
Presente (2002)	O Trovador Solitário (2008)	Duetos (2010)

O Trovador Solitário is a compilation by Brazilian singer-songwriter Renato Russo released on 13 July 2008 so as to coincide with World Rock Day. It was created with K7 tapes that he registered during his "O Trovator Solitário" (The Lonely Troubadour) era, in which he performed alone with his acoustic guitar in the 1980s, between the end of Aborto Elétrico and the founding of Legião Urbana.

It was released by independent label Discobertas and distributed by Coqueiro Verde and not by EMI, which released most Renato Russo and Legião Urbana albums.

== Background and curation ==
Copis of some of the tapes recorded by Russo were given to friends by him. Using them as a base, many poor quality versions were created and released on the internet for download. Such material was informally named "Rádio Brasília" (Brasília Radio).

Later, in February 2004, Renato Russo's father, also named Renato, died at 80 following complications of a surgery. At that time, journalist and producer Marcelo Froés (founder of Discobertas) invited Russo's sister, Carmem Teresa, to sing a version of "Rocky Racoon" with Banda Tantra (a band formed by Legião Urbana's session members) for the Álbum Branco (a tribute to The White Album by The Beatles).

After meeting him, she gave him a collection of K7 tapes with recordings of Russo singing at home with his acoustic guitar. All of them were recorded in 1982 at Russo's family home in Brasília (more precisely in his room), except for "Que País É Este", recorded at the same place but in 1978; and "Summertime", recorded live in Brasília's 1985 summer (the booklet wrongly stated it had been recorded in 1984). The tapes were found at the apartment itself.

Since the recordings were rudimentary and done in various moments and places, a sound recovery work was necessary, and that was done by mastering professional Ricardo Garcia.

=== Cover ===
The album cover features a picture of Russo as a child wearing plaid overalls. The booklet has words, doodles and sentences written by him, besides more childhood pictures.

=== "Summertime" ===
The only song featuring anyone else other than Russo, and also the only live one, is the closing track "Summertime", which features singer and pianist Cida Moreira. According to her, she would do a live presentation right after a Legião Urbana show (they were on tour promoting their debut album) and, before it began, she shared the stage with Russo to play three songs: "Die Moritat von Mackie e Messer", by Bertolt Brecht; one she no longer recalls, and "Summertime". The latter was the only one recorded by the sound technician and she kept the tape since then.

Zélia Duncan was among the audience and knew about the tape. She informed Fróes about it and he looked for Moreira to ask for the recording. With Russo's son permission, she handed the material to Fróes and it made it to the album.

== Track listing ==
All tracks are written by Renato Russo, except "Veraneio Vascaína", co-written by Flávio Lemos; and "Summertime", written by George Gershwin

No.	Title	English title	Length
1.	"Dado Viciado (Note: A double entendre; could mean both "Drug-Addicted Dado" ("Dado" being a common nickname for people named Eduardo) or "Loaded Dice")"		2:10
2.	"Eduardo e Mônica"	Eduardo and Mônica	4:32
3.	"Eu Sei"	I Know	2:00
4.	"Geração Coca-Cola"	Coca-Cola Generation	1:35
5.	"Faroeste Caboclo"	Caboclo Western	8:19
6.	"Boomerang Blues"		3:32
7.	"Anúncio de Refrigerante"	Soft Drink Commercial	1:58
8.	"Marcianos Invadem a Terra"	Martians Invade the Earth	2:14
9.	"Veraneio Vascaína (Note: "Veraneio" is the Brazilian variation of the Chevrolet Suburban introduced in the 1960s and "Vascaína" is an adjective for people or objects related to CR Vasco da Gama, a popular Rio de Janeiro football club. Because in the past, many Veraneios painted black and white (Vasco's traditional colors) were used by the police, the cars received the nickname "Veraneio Vascaína".)"		2:13
10.	"Que País É Este"	What Is This Country	2:08
11.	"Summertime" (live, featuring Cida Moreira)		3:54
Total length:			34:35
