= Brazilian Western =

2013 film directed by René Sampaio

- Faroeste Caboclo
- Directed by: René Sampaio
- Screenplay by: Victor Atherino; Marcos Bernstein; José Carvalho
- Based on: "Faroeste Caboclo" by Legião Urbana
- Produced by: Daniel Filho
- Starring: Fabrício Boliveira; Isis Valverde
- Cinematography: Gustavo Hadba
- Edited by: Márcio Hashimoto Soares
- Production companies: Gávea Filmes; Globo Filmes
- Distributed by: Europa Filmes
- Release date: 30 May 2013
- Running time: 108 minutes
- Country: Brazil
- Language: Brazilian Portuguese
- Budget: R$6 million ($2.4 million)
- Box office: $7.4 million

Brazilian Western (Portuguese: Faroeste Caboclo) is a 2013 Brazilian crime drama film directed and produced by René Sampaio, starring Fabrício Boliveira, Isis Valverde and César Troncoso.

It is based on the popular 9-minutes-long Brazilian song "Faroeste Caboclo", released by Brazilian rock band Legião Urbana in their 1987 Que País É Este album. Shootings for the film took place primarily in the Brazilian Central-West region, in Cidade Ocidental, Goiás.

The film was screened in the Contemporary World Cinema section at the 2013 Toronto International Film Festival.

== Plot ==
João do Santo Cristo (Fabrício Boliveira) was raised in the countryside of Bahia by his parents on a poor, small farm. His father was shot and killed by a police officer as a punishment for hurting the cop's brother, who was himself hurting João earlier for trying to steal candy. When João is older, his mother dies and he decides to leave home for Brasília, to meet a relative he discovered by looking at some old pictures. Before leaving town, however, he executes his father's killer and is caught by police at the bus stop. After doing time in prison, he is finally able to go to Brasília.

Upon arriving in Brasília, he meets his cousin Pablo (César Troncoso) and start doing small illegal tasks for him, such as delivering drugs. Pablo also gives him weapons (including the Winchester 22 cited in the eponymous song). He also starts working at a local carpentry to earn some money. One of his drug delivery operations goes wrong and is stormed by the police. In order to escape, he manages to break into an apartment. There, he meets Maria Lúcia (Isis Valverde), a punk music enthusiast and daughter of a senator. Despite the circumstances, they end up falling in love after João visits her one more time and asks her out.

When Maria Lúcia shows her friend the marijuana João can provide, they immediately like it and ask for more. This upsets Jeremias (Felipe Abib), the local drug dealer, and he tries to have João killed with the help of his partner and corrupt police officer Marco Aurélio (Antônio Calloni). Maria disapproves João's criminal activities and demands him to stop. He promises Maria he will stop committing crimes, but he and Pablo start a new drug empire in Brasília taking advantage of the better marijuana they can offer.

In order to regain their respect and market around the city, Jeremias and his allies organize a "rockonha" (a portmanteau of “Rock” (the musical genre) and “Maconha” (marijuana), it refers to a party with rock’n’roll music and marijuana), and João is invited. Upon arriving, he is chased by Jeremias and his two henchmen. The trio corners João at the edge of a hill, but Pablo and a friend were already waiting nearby. Jeremias turns the tables once again in his favor and reveals that he has several criminals and corrupt officers covering him. Pablo pushes João down the hill and sacrifices himself to buy João some time.

João ends up captured anyway and is taken to prison. There, he spends several days, and each day he is ordered to hold a newspaper in front of him so Marco can photograph both. One day, during this task, João manages to grab hold of Marco and sets himself and all other prisoners free. He then executes Marco and heads for a final assault on Jeremias and his drug empire. He starts by killing Jeremia's right handman and stealing all his cocaine, leaving a message daring Jeremias to a duel.

At the assigned place, Jeremias finds three final bags of his cocaine hanging from a football goal. When he approaches the bags, João shoots them. They both stare at each other. Maria arrives with João's Winchester .22 and aims it at Jeremias. While João looks at her, Jeremias takes the moment to shoot him. With João, shot and on the ground, Maria kneels by João's side, and Jeremias shoots her as well. Jeremias then turns around to check on his wasted cocaine. João, still breathing, loads his Winchester and shoots Jeremias five times, killing him. The film ends with João and Maria lying dead beside each other and with scenes of them together and João's narration.

In a post-credits scene, an alternate, more song-loyal ending is presented, with João and Jeremias about to duel in front of a crowd, as originally described in the song. It ends with both drawing out their guns and pointing them at each other, while Maria is shown having a brief spasm.

== Cast ==
- Fabrício Boliveira as João de Santo Cristo
- Ísis Valverde as Maria Lúcia
- Felipe Abib as Jeremias
- Antônio Calloni as Marco Aurélio
- César Troncoso as Pablo
- Cinara Leal as Teresa
- Marcos Paulo as Ney
- Rômulo Augusto as Saci
- Juliana Lohmann as Cris
- Rodrigo Pandolfo as Beto
- Max Lima as young Santo Cristo

== Production ==
=== Development ===
In July 2005, O Globo informed that production on Faroeste Caboclo had started and was being led by director René Sampaio. According to him, he wanted to watch a movie based on the song, and found it funny that he was involved in the production of such film. He described it as a "Greek tragedy".

Everyone who listened to the song in that time imagined that that story could become a movie. It ended up that I was the director and I could carry on with this project. The idea is to make a movie that is loyal to Renato's lyrics.

The first contracts to initiate the writing process were done with Russos's family, which approved it. However, in early 2007, Editora Tapajós tried to legally stop the production of the film, stating that it has been holding the song's copyrights for more than 20 years, and saying that the family could not negotiate the movie without their permission. The final decision of the Superior Court of Justice came on January 1, 2007, declining Tapajós's request to make the film. Since then, the producers spent some time trying to raise funds for the movie.

=== Casting ===
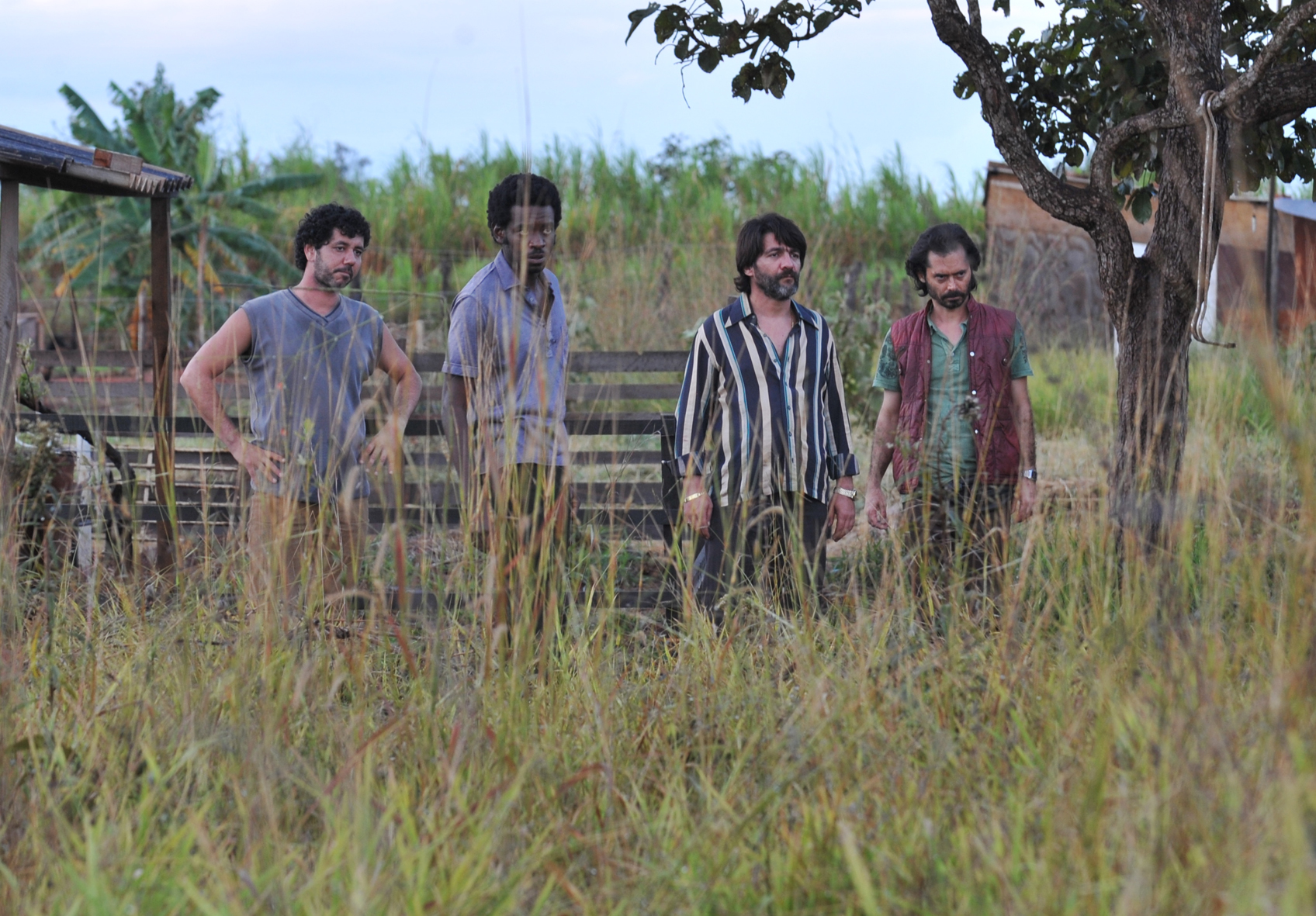
Actors during the shootings.

The main cast of the movie was confirmed on February 9, 2011. Fabrício Boliveira was chosen to play the main role, João de Santo Cristo; Ísis Valverde was confirmed as his love interest Maria Lúcia; and Felipe Adib will be the antagonist Jeremias. On April 15, 2011, Cinara Leal was chosen to play Teresa, since Fabiula Nascimento had to leave the film due to her busy schedule.

César Troncoso, husband of Teresa, was confirmed on 23 May 2011. About his character, he commented:

Brazil is a country of many contrasts, and the movie talks about it. People who never lived in poverty may have difficulties in understanding the paths some people chose. Pablo wants his life to work in the way he knows, be it bringing smuggle from Bolivia, whatever. Because if he doesn't do this, he simply doesn't eat.

=== Filming ===
Filming began on April 12, 2011. The first scene shot was when João de Santo Cristo arrives at Brasília. The production team had to alter the highway so that it resembled the appearance from the 70s. Also, the crew found a 1955 city bus that had been functioning in the capital since its foundation, and used it in the film.

The movie was shot in Brasília and in the countryside of São Paulo state. At the border of the Federal District with Goiás, a set city was built in order to recreate Ceilândia as it was in the 80s. The set was built in an empty terrain belonging to a landfill company.

== Reception ==
=== Box office ===
After its first week in theaters, Faroest Caboclo had sold 554,911 tickets. The number of tickets sold fell consecutively from the second week onwards, ending with a total of 1,495,356 tickets after eight weeks in theaters.

=== Critical reception ===
Faroeste Caboclo received generally positive reviews from critics, averaging 3.4 out of 5 stars.

=== Awards ===
Faroeste Cabloclo swept the 2014 Brazilian Film Grand Prix. It received 13 nominations and won seven of them, including Best Feature Film and Best Actor (Fabrício Boliveira, playing João de Santo Cristo).
