= As Quatro Estações =

Studio album by Legião Urbana
- Released: October 26, 1989
- Recorded: August–October 1989
- Genres: Alternative rock; art rock; post-punk
- Length: 46:23
- Label: EMI-Odeon
- Producer: Mayrton Bahia

Legião Urbana chronology
Que País É Este (1987)	As Quatro Estações (1989)	V (1991)

Singles from As Quatro Estações
- 1. "Há Tempos" Released: 1989; 2. "Pais e Filhos" Released: 1989; 3. "1965 (Duas Tribos)" Released: 1989

Professional ratings
Review scores
Source	Rating
AllMusic	4.5/5 stars

As Quatro Estações (transl. The Four Seasons) is the fourth studio album by the Brazilian rock band Legião Urbana. It was released on October 26, 1989. It is Legião Urbana's first release without bassist Renato Rocha, who was fired from the band prior to the album's recording sessions due to his lack of commitment to the group.

With over 1,9 million copies sold (730,000 in its first year), it is the band's most commercially successful album, and it was certified platinum by ABPD.

== Background and production ==
=== Renato Rocha's departure ===
Legião Urbana returned to the studio when they were about to achieve a million sold albums, when the commercial performance of all three previous albums were combined. Despite that, the atmosphere among members was bitter, partially due to the then recent Mané Garrincha stadium incident, but also because the situation of bassist Renato Rocha became more and more complicated. After he bought a ranch in Mendes, he would take around two hours to reach the studio in Rio de Janeiro. He skipped many sessions and, when he did come, it would take him a while to mingle with the group. Many times he asked to take the tapes home so he could create his arrangements there. Six months into the album's creation, he was fired in a meeting at label EMI-Odeon's office. The remaining members decided he would maintain all his rights over the album, although they erased all his contributions and removed his name from the effort.

=== Songwriting ===
It took the album a year to be ready because the band struggled to create something that satisfied them. The situation reached a point in which Russo considered disbanding the group. However, because they had a high reputation in the label, the company gave them as much time and space as they needed. Producer Mayrton Bahia was the only one affected negatively by the delay. He was a freelancer at the time and no longer a full-time employee of EMI. Therefore, he worked for months in a never ending project, preventing him from getting paid.

In an interview to Bizz magazine in June 1989, Villa-Lobos said the band wanted to create songs that were more varied and "more elaborate [...] instead of having two notes, like 'Ainda é Cedo' and 'Soldados', they'll have five", besides rejecting the need for session musicians. Back then, they already had "Pais e Filhos", "Há Tempos" and "1965 (Duas Tribos)" ready.

== Song information ==
"Pais e Filhos"

A concert promoting the album took place at the Palestra Itália Stadium in 1990. This concert's recording was released as a live album in 2004, under the name As Quatro Estações ao Vivo. During that performance, Russo said "Pais e Filhos" was written in the bathroom, and dedicated it to "everyone who thinks a cockroach is more important than the people we love". That was a response to Paulinho Moska, then vocalist of Brazilian punk band Inimigos do Rei, stating that the band's song "Uma Barata Chamada Kafka" (A Cockroach Named Kafka) was as good as Legião Urbana's song.

According to Bahia, the song was born with a lot of guitar layers and spare sounds, as if many songs existed in a single one. In order to solve it, he returned to cutting and gluing tape sections with duct tape. The song's lyrics discuss suicide. In 1994, when the band was performing at SBT's Programa Livre, Russo reprehended the audience after they happily reacted to the announcement that they would play the song:

Hey, you people know this song is about suicide, right? [...] It's about a girl that has issues with her parents, she jumped from the 5th floor window and there's no tomorrow. [...] This is a very serious song, just like ""Índios"". [...] I wouldn't stand listening to it two times in a row. [...] Sometimes these songs reflect a moment of my life that I no longer want to remember.

The song "Feedback Song for a Dying Friend" is a tribute to American photographer Robert Mapplethorpe, a couple of friends and Cazuza, who had AIDS, a disease that would eventually kill him in 1990 and Russo in 1996. The album booklet has a translation of the lyrics. Originally, the song would be in Portuguese, with the name "Rapazes Católicos" (Catholic Guys). However, the lyrics were rejected (the band itself considered them "unpublishable") and changed to the final version in English, while retaining the original instrumental base. The translation is signed by writer Millôr Fernandes. Initially, Fernandes refused to do it, stating he didn't do translations to English. However, he changed his mind after the band switched languages and asked him to do a translation to Portuguese, instead. He did the job for a "highly professional" pay and was impressed by Russo's handling of the language, including accurate citations of Shakespeare. Fernandes is considered the greatest translator of Shakespeare for theater.

The lyrics of "1965 (Duas Tribos)" refer to Revell models and Hanna-Barbera Studios. The first versions of "Monte Castelo" song was based on the acoustic guitar and a keyboard synthesizing an accordion, over which Russo tried to sing. He struggled to find a melody line and ended up recording many channels with his voice, making the music base and the lyrics chaotic. The text became so scary that caused guitarist Dado Villa-Lobos and his wife Fernanda to flee from the studio after they read the written words. The mixing was also hard, since Russo would never be satisfied with producer Mayrton Bahia's work. The situation reached a point in which Russo turned off the sound and Bahia threatened to finish the album without him. Russo didn't say a word and then he said he liked the final result. Villa-Lobos, on the other hand, cried when he listened to the song's final version.

With "Meninos e Meninas", Russo suggested his bisexuality. Brazilian rock band Titãs covered "Sete Cidades" on their album As Dez Mais. The ending of "Se Fiquei Esperando Meu Amor Passar" includes the Agnus Dei in Portuguese, ending the album with a prayer.

=== Title ===
Regarding the album title, Renato Russo told Bizz magazine:

There's really this spring, cycles thing. I'd like it to be about cycles, the loss of innocence, you reaching a certain stage in which you lost something, or you're going to work and reclaim that. Because in our case, since we're artists, it gets easier than to other people. But it would basically be it: spring, summer, then comes autumn and all leaves fall. In winter the tree becomes like that. It's like as if we were approaching winter. But then spring is drawing near, again. I mean, you can choose to have a new spring.

== Track listing ==
All tracks are written by Dado Villa-Lobos, Marcelo Bonfá, Renato Russo, except for "Monte Castelo", by Russo only

No.	Title	Length
1.	"Há Tempos" (It's Been A While)	3:18
2.	"Pais e Filhos" (Parents and Children)	5:08
3.	"Feedback Song for a Dying Friend"	5:25
4.	"Quando o Sol Bater na Janela do Teu Quarto" (When the Sun Shines on Your Bedroom's Window)	3:13
5.	"Eu Era um Lobisomem Juvenil" (I Was a Teenage Werewolf)	6:45
6.	"1965 (Duas Tribos)" (1965 (Two Tribes))	3:44
7.	"Monte Castelo"	3:50
8.	"Maurício"	3:17
9.	"Meninos e Meninas" (Boys and Girls)	3:23
10.	"Sete Cidades" (Seven Cities)	3:25
11.	"Se Fiquei Esperando Meu Amor Passar" (If I Stayed Waiting For My Lover to Pass By)	4:56
Total length:		46:23

== Certifications ==
Country	Certification	Sales
Brazil (Pro-Música Brasil)	Diamond	1.900.000+

== Personnel ==
Legião Urbana

- Renato Russo: vocals, acoustic and electric guitars, bass guitar, keyboards, harmonica
- Dado Villa-Lobos: electric and acoustic guitars, bass guitar, percussion, mandolin
- Marcelo Bonfá: drums, percussion, harmonica

== Bibliography ==
- Alexandre, Ricardo (2013). Dias de Luta: O rock e o Brasil dos anos 80. Porto Alegre: Arquipélago. ISBN 978-85-60171-39-2.
- Conversações com Renato Russo. Campo Grande: Letra Livre. 1996. ISBN 978-85-86399-02-2.
- Fuscaldo, Chris (2016). Discobiografia Legionária. São Paulo: LeYa. ISBN 978-85-441-0481-1.
