= Que País É Este (song) =

Song by Brazilian rock band Legião Urbana

Single by Legião Urbana

from the album Que País É Este
- Released: 1987
- Recorded: 1986
- Genre: Alternative rock; hard rock; punk rock
- Length: 2:54
- Label: EMI-Odeon
- Songwriter: Renato Russo
- Producer: Mayrton Bahia

Legião Urbana singles chronology
"Acrillic on Canvas" (1987)	"Que País É Este" (1987)	"Angra dos Reis" (1987)

Music video
- "Que País É Este" on YouTube

"Que País É Este" ("What Country Is This") is a song by Brazilian rock band Legião Urbana. It was written by Renato Russo in 1978, when he was still a member of Aborto Elétrico. However, it was only released in 1987 on Legião Urbana's album Que País É Este.

About such delay, Russo explained:

"'Que país é este' was never recorded because there was the hope that something would actually change in the country, making the song totally obsolete then. This didn't happen and it's still possible to make the same question of the title."

The song was ranked at #81 on the list of "The 100 Greatest Brazilian Songs" by Rolling Stone Brasil. In 1987, it was the Brazilian song with the biggest airplay, and the second if international music is considered, standing behind "Livin' on a Prayer", by Bon Jovi. In 2013, it was elected as "Brazil's most remarkable protest song ", in a poll conducted by iG.

== History ==
The song was composed by vocalist and acoustic guitarist Renato Russo, when he was still a member of punk band Aborto Elétrico. However, even after the end of the band, Russo would still perform the song in his then new band Legião Urbana (founded in 1983).

Russo took advantage of the Brazilian political scenery to finally record the song in 1987, when the country was emerging from a military dictatorship.

== Personnel ==
Per the album booklet:

- Renato Russo — vocals, acoustic guitar
- Dado Villa-Lobos — guitar
- Renato Rocha — bass
- Marcelo Bonfá — drums

== Notable cover versions ==
- In 1999, the band Os Paralamas do Sucesso cover it on Acústico MTV.
- In 2005, the band Capital Inicial covered it on MTV Especial: Aborto Elétrico, lançado em CD e DVD.
- Also in 2005, Titãs covered it live for the album Renato Russo - Uma Celebração.

== Alleged plagiarism ==
There are controversies about the song's main riff being plagiarism of "I Don't Care", by American punk rock band Ramones. When confronted about this, Russo said "eu não ligo!", which is the Ramones' song title translated to Portuguese. Soon after, he admitted to having drawn inspiration from the song.
