= Que País É Este =

Studio album by Legião Urbana
- Released: November 1987
- Recorded: October 1987
- Genres: Post-punk; punk rock
- Length: 36:10
- Label: EMI-Odeon
- Producer: Mayrton Bahia

Legião Urbana chronology
Dois (1986)	Que País É Este (1987)	As Quatro Estações (1989)

Singles from Que País É Este
- 1. "Que País É Este" Released: 1987; 2. "Angra dos Reis" Released: 1988; 3. "Faroeste Caboclo" Released: 1988; 4. "Eu Sei" Released: 1988

Que País É Este (transl. What Country Is This), subtitled 1978/1987, is the third studio album by Brazilian rock band Legião Urbana, released in 1987. The album booklet features a cartoon by drummer Marcelo Bonfá depicting the constant guitarist changes that the band went through until they hired Dado Villa-Lobos.

The album sold more than 1 million copies, receiving a Diamond Certification by ABPD. It was also the last Legião Urbana album to feature bassist Renato Rocha — he would leave the band during the recording sessions of the next release, As Quatro Estações.

== History ==
The studio recording of Que País É Este was originally intended for a double album called Mitologia e Intuição ("Mythology and Intuition"; it was also tentatively named Disciplina e Virtude, which means ""Discipline and Virtue"), which would include recordings from this album and the previous one Dois. The idea was rejected and what was left of the project was released in this album.

The project was changed because, following Dois's success, the label pressured them for a third album but they didn't have enough repertoire for that. Only "Mais do Mesmo" and "Angra dos Reis" were written during the album's sessions.

Besides the label's pressure (strengthened by the fact that the band had already missed the agreed deadline of three albums in 36 months), vocalist and acoustic guitarist Renato Russo himself would demand himself to quickly record some songs from his time with Aborto Elétrico ("Que País É Este", "Conexão Amazônica" and "Tédio") before Capital Inicial – another band spun off Aborto Elétrico – had the opportunity to do that. This helped the band let go of the idea of an all-new album in favor of some kind of anthology. At that time, they denied having faced any pressure from the label. Villa-Lobos said then:

The thing with this album which we stopped recording is that its project would initially be called Disciplina e Virtude. By the time we got into the studio, we couldn't talk about discipline, let alone virtue in the chaos in which we were and in which the country was. It was the Cruzado II times!

This helped to solve the lack of songs problem. Many of them were originally written when Russo performed under the name "Trovador Solitário" (Lonely Troubadour) ("Faroeste Caboclo", for example), alone with his acoustic guitar. "Que País É Este" and "Conexão Amazônica", for example, were written in 1978.

"Eu Sei" was written between the end of Aborto Elétrico and the foundation of Legião Urbana; a pirate version of the song was already being aired at some radio stations back then. As such, Russo saw the album as a way of putting an end to the widespread airing of pirate recordings of his songs. The fact that the album involved songs written throughout years is expressed in its title.

Initial versions of "Eu Sei" and "Faroeste Caboclo", recorded in 1982 by Russo singing and playing the acoustic guitar, were recovered and released in 2008 on his posthumous solo album O Trovador Solitário. The verse "talvez tenhamos que fugir sem você" (we may have to flee without you) from "Eu Sei" originally read "talvez tenhamos que correr e perder" (we may have to run and lose).

The album was ready in just a month. The recording took two weeks and the tracks "Que País É Este", "Conexão Amazônica", "Tédio" and "Química" were recorded in only one take.

It was during this album's recording sessions that conflicts erupted between bassist Renato Rocha and the rest of the band and EMI-Odeon personnel. He was constantly late and unable to play his parts the way Russo wanted them to be performed, which made the band start to regret having hired him.

== Song information ==
"Angra dos Reis" mentions the construction of a nuclear power plant in the city of same name in the state of Rio de Janeiro and "Mais do Mesmo" would later be the title of a compilation by the band; this was the original planned title for this album.

"Faroeste Caboclo" was composed in 1979 during the "O Trovador Solitário" era of Renato Russo. Clocking at over nine minutes and possessing no choruses among its 159 verses, the song tells the story of João de Santo Cristo. Russo considered it his "Hurricane". It was the longest song by the band until the release of "Metal contra as Nuvens" from V.

The album also features "Depois do Começo", the only song by Russo that he admitted to not liking later, since he considered it too pretentious. It was created with Aborto Elétrico's "Anúncio de Refrigerante" as the basis. "Química" had already been recorded by Os Paralamas do Sucesso in their debut album Cinema Mudo.

== Promotion ==
=== Tour ===
During the tour launched to promote this album, an infamous performance of the band at Mané Garrincha Stadium in Brasília took place in June 1988 for an audience of some 50,000 people. The band started the show one hour late. During the fourth song ("Conexão Amazônica"), Russo was attacked by a man, who was removed by security. As the show continued, the audience started to throw objects at the musicians, to which Russo replied with provocations. After one hour, the band left the stage and a frustrated audience caused a crush that resulted in 380 injured people The band ended up sued by Distrito Federal's government.

Russo even said he would never return to Brasília after this incident, but he took it back soon after. One month later, when the band performed at Maracanãzinho in Rio de Janeiro, the audience threw daisies in response to the incident in Brazil's capital.

This incident increased Russo's stage fright, and Legião Urbana's following work would become more introspective.

== Track listing ==
All tracks are written by Renato Russo, except where noted

No.	Title	English title	Length
1.	"Que País É Este"	What Country Is This	2:57
2.	"Conexão Amazônica" (Russo/Fê Lemos)	Amazon Connection	4:37
3.	"Tédio (Com um T Bem Grande pra Você)"	Boredom (With a Very Big B for You)	2:32
4.	"Depois do Começo"	After the Beginning	3:13
5.	"Química"	Chemistry	2:19
6.	"Eu Sei"	I Know	3:10
7.	"Faroeste Caboclo"	Caboclo Western	9:04
8.	"Angra dos Reis" (Russo, Renato Rocha, Marcelo Bonfá)		5:00
9.	"Mais do Mesmo" (Dado Villa-Lobos, Russo, Rocha, Bonfá)	More of the Same	3:20
Total length:			36:10

=== Covers ===
- Brazilian bands Pato Fu, 14 Bis and Boca Livre have made cover versions of "Eu Sei".
- Metal band Viper have covered "Mais do Mesmo" on their album Tem pra Todo Mundo.
- Os Paralamas do Sucesso and Titãs have both covered the title track; the first in their 1999 live album Acústico MTV, and the latter during a live Legião Urbana tribute by various artists.

== Personnel ==
Per the booklet:

=== Legião Urbana ===
- Renato Russo — lead vocals, keyboards, rhythm guitar, acoustic guitar
- Dado Villa-Lobos — lead guitar, percussion, backing vocals
- Renato Rocha — bass, backing vocals
- Marcelo Bonfá — drums, percussion, keyboards

=== Technical personnel ===
- Jorge Davidson – artistic direction
- Mayrton Bahia – production direction, executive producer, mixing
- Jorge Brum – studio assistant
- Ricardo Junqueira – cover and booklet pictures
- Marcelo Benzaquêm – booklet pictures
- Fernanda Villa-Lobos – art direction and execution
- J. C. Mello – graphic coordithation

== Reception ==
=== Critical reception ===
Professional ratings
Review scores
Source	Rating
Allmusic	4.5/5 stars

Unlike the two previous efforts, Que País É Este wasn't unanimously well received by critics. Tárik de Souza, at O Globo, and Arthur Dapieve, at Jornal do Brasil, were positive towards the album, albeit recognizing its construction using previously unreleased songs scattered through different eras and projects. Folha de S.Paulo's Mário César Carvalho, on the other hand, called it "squalid", missed "a certain musical elaboration in the purposely simple and direct lyrics" and saw "signs of a crisis" in the group.

The title track was voted by the Brazilian edition of Rolling Stone as the 81st greatest Brazilian song.

=== Commercial reception ===
==== Album certification ====
Region	Certification	Certified units/sales
Brazil (Pro-Música Brasil)	Diamond	1,000,000^{*}
^{*} Sales figures based on certification alone.
