= Andrea Doria (song) =

Single by Legião Urbana

from the album Dois
- Released: 1986
- Genre: Post-punk
- Length: 4:53
- Label: EMI-Odeon
- Songwriter: Renato Russo
- Producer: Mayrton Bahia

Legião Urbana singles chronology
"Fábrica" (1986)	"Andrea Doria" (1986)

Music video
- "Andrea Doria" on YouTube

"Andrea Doria" is a song from Brazilian rock band Legião Urbana's 1986 album Dois.

The song's title comes from the shipwreck of the vessel of the same name, which occurred in 1956 after a collision with a Swedish ship.

== Background ==
According to Renato Russo, the song is about the dreams and plans of youth, which come up against hypocrisy, lies, consumerism, capitalism and aufragam.
