= Tsubasa Imamura =

Japanese singer

Tsubasa Imamura (今村つばさ, Imamura Tsubasa) is a Japanese singer who became known in Brazil after posting YouTube videos covering Brazilian songs.

== Career ==
Imamura has recorded three solo albums. In 2009, she released one containing re-recordings of Japanese pop songs under the name Ra Moosh; and, in 2011, a DVD. In that same year, she performed in Brazil. In 2013, she performed at Anime Jungle Party, in Manaus; and at SANA in Fortaleza.

Due to her popularity in Brazil, the released an album called Por Você (translation: "For You"), with three exclusive songs for her Brazilian audience. That was in 2014.

In 2016, she was chosen to be in the recording of the 20-year special compilation album for Renato Russo.

== Discography ==
=== Studio albums ===
- Ame no Yoru ni (2009)
- How to Fly (2012)
- Tsubasa (2018)

=== Other albums ===
- Taiyo no Sunamakura - Resort Cafe (2009)
- Ame no Yoru ni - Live at Bunka Hall Kanazawa (2010)
- Por Você (2014)
