= Dois =

Dois may refer to:

- RTP2, a Portuguese television channel
- Dois (album), by Legião Urbana
- DOIs, plural of digital object identifier
