= "Índios" =

1986 song by Legião Urbana

Single by Legião Urbana

from the album Dois
- Released: 1986
- Recorded: 1986
- Genre: New wave
- Length: 4:31
- Label: EMI-Odeon
- Songwriter: Renato Russo
- Producer: Mayrton Bahia

Legião Urbana singles chronology
"Eduardo e Mônica" (1986)	"Índios" (1986)	"Quase Sem Querer" (1986)

"Índios" is a song composed by Renato Russo, released in 1986 on the Dois album by Legião Urbana and also released as the third single from the album in December the same year. A live version was also released in 2001 as a single from the live album Como é Que Se Diz Eu te Amo.

The song's title includes quotation marks, alluding to David Bowie's ""Heroes"". According to Russo, they are used to indicate that the title does not refer to Brazil's first inhabitants, but to the innocence instilled in the country's people since its beginnings, with them always being fooled by their leaders. The song begs for a different world, with less selfish people.

== History and structure ==
Russo struggled to match the lyrics to the music. Over ten different recordings were attempted. When he was about to give up, producer Mayrton Bahia and sound technician Amaro Moço started editing the recordings, a technique they had already used a lot with the band's previous record, Legião Urbana.

The song is based on a keyboard mantra. Guitarist Dado Villa-Lobos only adds an acoustic guitar.

== Reception ==
Reception to the song has been in general positive. Antônio Carlos Miguel, in a review of Dois for Jornal da Tarde, considered the song the album's "most fascinating" one. He said: "In a hypnotic take, repeating the same musical theme, he [Russo] attempts to translate the first and real owners of Brazil's despair (...) Works such as this one, uniting pleasure and awareness, could even contribute to the thriving of the last indigenous people. Or show the so-called civilized people that we can still learn a lot with the innocence of these peoples".

Gilmar Eitelwein, in a review for Zero Hora, said that "Índios' lyrics are very good" and, when describing another track, "Andrea Doria", said it too "attacks human falsehood found around every corner".

During the album's tour, amidst a performance at Caiçara Music Hall, the audience asked the band to play the song, but they refused, in spite of the public's protests.

== Personnel ==
- Renato Russo – vocals, acoustic guitar and keyboard
- Dado Villa-Lobos – guitar
- Renato Rocha – bass
- Marcelo Bonfá – drums

== Track listing ==
12" PROMO (EMI 9951 023)

Side A
No.	Title	Writer(s)	Performer	Length
1.	"Índios"	Renato Russo	Legião Urbana	4:23
2.	"Proteção" (Remix)	Philippe Seabra	Plebe Rude	4:32

Side B
No.	Title	Writer(s)	Performer	Length
3.	"Alguém" (Remix)	Kiko Zambianchi	Kiko Zambianchi	5:10
4.	"Formosa" (Remix)	F. Haiat / E. Amarante / G. Isnard	Zero	4:55

== Certifications ==
Certifications for "Índios"
Region	Certification	Certified units/sales
Brazil (Pro-Música Brasil)	Gold	50,000^{‡}
^{‡} Sales+streaming figures based on certification alone.
