= More of the Same =

More of the Same may refer to:

- "More of the Same", a song by Sepultura from Roorback
- "More of the Same", a song from Ballroom, performed by Lynn Roberts and Bernie Knee
- "More of the Same", a song by James Hype
- Mais do Mesmo (transl. More of the Same), an album by Legião Urbana
