= Perfeição =

Single by Legião Urbana

from the album O Descobrimento do Brasil
- Released: 1993
- Recorded: August–October 1993
- Genre: Alternative rock; spoken word
- Length: 4:37
- Label: EMI-Odeon
- Songwriter: Renato Russo
- Producer: Mayrton Bahia

Legião Urbana singles chronology
"Do Espírito" (1993)	"Perfeição" (1993)	"O Passeio Da Boa Vista - Instrumental"

Music video
- "Perfeição" on YouTube

Perfeição is a song from Brazilian rock band Legião Urbana's 1993 album O Descobrimento do Brasil.

== Background ==
This song deals with the problems that Brazil was facing at the time, during the administration of Fernando Collor de Mello.

== Music video ==
The music video for Perfeição was directed by Flavio Colker, and was recorded in the city of Maricá, in the state of Rio de Janeiro. This was the last music video that the band recorded before the death of its vocalist, Renato Russo.
