= O Descobrimento do Brasil (album) =

Studio album by Legião Urbana
- Released: November 1993
- Recorded: August–October 1993
- Studio: Discover (Rio de Janeiro)
- Genres: Alternative rock; art rock; psychedelic rock; jangle pop
- Length: 51:20
- Label: EMI-Odeon
- Producers: Mayrton Bahia, Legião Urbana

Legião Urbana chronology
| Música P/ Acampamentos (1992) | O Descobrimento do Brasil (1993) | A Tempestade, ou O Livro dos Dias (1996) |

Singles from O Descobrimento do Brasil
- 1. "Perfeição" Released: 1993

O Descobrimento do Brasil (transl. The Discovery of Brazil) is the sixth studio album by Brazilian rock band Legião Urbana. Released in November 1993, it sold more than a half million copies and was certified double platinum by ABPD.

== Background ==
O Descobrimento do Brasil was the band's first album without Jorge Davidson as artistic manager of EMI-Odeon – he was then working at Sony Music and was replaced by João Augusto.

The album was created in a moment of tension between the band and the label. By then, EMI had sold its album factory and was using Fonobras, which belonged to their competitor PolyGram. Coincidentally, the band's producer Mayrton Bahia was working there and knew from an incoming request that EMI-Odeon intended to release a compilation without the band's consent. Furious, the members tagged the walls of the company's management department. Vocalist, acoustic guitarist and keyboardist Renato Russo particularly wrote some sentences in English, including "You treat us like trash! You'll never do it anymore!".

Unaware of what the label would do to them, they suspended the album sessions until the company made a move. In the end, EMI cancelled the compilation. That was one of the reasons João Augusto proceeded with caution when initiating his relationship with the band.

== Recording ==
The band got into the studio in August 1993 and the album was ready by October. The members experimented with new instruments, besides playing each others'. Drummer Marcelo Bonfá played the keyboards, while guitarist Dado Villa-Lobos experimented with the dobro and the mandolin and Russo recorded a performance with the sitar. Working on the album, they became one of the first Brazilian groups to use Pro Tools in studio to do minor sound fixes.

== Content ==
=== Cover art ===
The cover was supposed to convey the moment of lightness and optimism that the band was experiencing by the time of the album's release. It depicts the members in a flowery field especially set for the shot, each of them wearing a different attire: Russo is dressed like a medieval knight, Villa-Lobos as a hunter with a mandolin and Bonfá as a peasant. The photograph was taken by Flávio Colker. On the day of the photo sessions, Villa-Lobos had his car and his mandolin stolen in front of the studio and the band had to replace the instrument.

=== Booklet ===
The booklet had in its last page the sentence "Ah, but I was so much older then, I'm younger than that now", taken from the song "My Back Pages" by Bob Dylan. The band also thanked Léo Jaime (misspelled as "Leo Jayme"), who lent Renato and Dado his dobro.

=== Music ===
The album was titled O Descobrimento do Brasil because it came in a time when Russo was recovering from drugs and the other members were optimistic about the future. Besides, as Russo told Jornal do Brasil:

"We believe in Brazil. There are many nice things. They want us to be thieves, to be like they are. But we're not."

The band intended to do a different work than the previous release, V, which brought, according to them, "those progressive songs, with a melancholic load". The idea of the new album, in Russo's view, was for it to be a collection of short pop singles. In response to comments that the album's lyrics were "childish", Russo told Jornal do Brasil that the intention was to make simple music so that the members' children could understand them.

The opening track "Vinte e Nove" mentions Russo's alcoholism, as well as "Só Por Hoje", (the Portuguese-language version of "Just For Today") which reproduces a motto of the Alcoholics Anonymous. "Perfeição" received a video with the same flowery design of the album cover, being produced by MTV Brasil and becoming the last Legião Urbana music video.

"Um Dia Perfeito" reflects the album's optimism and features a child choir composed of Nico and Mimi, Dado's children; and their friends Gabri, Antonio, Rafa, Pedro and Juju.

"Love In The Afternoon" is considered as a tribute to bassist Tavinho Fialho to which the album was dedicated due to his death in a car accident that occurred in Unaí, Minas Gerais, precisely on August 22, 1993, three months before its release. Fialho, in addition to having accompanied Legião Urbana during the tour for their previous album, was also a guest bassist for the singer (and, also, Russo's friend) Cássia Eller, with whom he would have a son, the also singer Chico Chico, born six days after his death.

== Track listing ==
All lyrics are written by Renato Russo.

| No. | Title | Music | English title | Length |
|---|---|---|---|---|
| 1. | "Vinte E Nove" | Renato Russo | Twenty-Nine | 3:43 |
| 2. | "A Fonte" | Dado Villa-Lobos, Russo, Marcelo Bonfá | The Fountain | 3:56 |
| 3. | "Do Espírito" | Villa-Lobos, Russo, Bonfá | Of The Spirit | 3:22 |
| 4. | "Perfeição" | Villa-Lobos, Russo, Bonfá | Perfection | 4:37 |
| 5. | "O Passeio Da Boa Vista" (Instrumental) | Villa-Lobos, Russo | The Boa Vista Stroll | 2:02 |
| 6. | "O Descobrimento Do Brasil" | Bonfá | The Discovery Of Brazil | 5:03 |
| 7. | "Os Barcos" | Villa-Lobos, Russo | The Boats | 2:52 |
| 8. | "Vamos Fazer Um Filme" | Russo | Let's Make A Movie | 4:21 |
| 9. | "Os Anjos" | Villa-Lobos | The Angels | 2:04 |
| 10. | "Um Dia Perfeito" | Villa-Lobos | A Perfect Day | 3:25 |
| 11. | "Giz" | Villa-Lobos, Russo, Bonfá | Chalk | 3:23 |
| 12. | "Love in the Afternoon" | Villa-Lobos, Russo | | 4:26 |
| 13. | "La Nuova Gioventù" | Villa-Lobos, Bonfá | The New Youth | 4:03 |
| 14. | "Só Por Hoje" | Villa-Lobos, Russo | Just For Today | 4:03 |
| Total length: | | | | 51:32 |

"Perfeição" contains an interpolation of "O Bêbado & A Equilibrista" (Aldir Blanc, João Bosco).

== Personnel ==
- Renato Russo – lead vocals (1–4, 6–14), acoustic guitar (1, 2, 5–7, 11, 14), electric bass (1–4, 7, 9, 10, 12–14), synthesizer keyboards (2, 4–6, 8, 10–13), sitar (12, 14), dobro (12).
- Dado Villa-Lobos – backing vocals (2, 4), electric guitar (1–5, 7–14), acoustic guitar (8), electric bass (6, 11), mandolin (1, 6, 8, 11, 14), dobro (7, 14).
- Marcelo Bonfá – backing vocals (2, 4, 11, 13), acoustic drums (1–4, 7–11, 13, 14), percussions (8, 14), synthesizer keyboards (2, 4, 8, 10), rhythm track (4, 6).
- Flávio Colker – cover picture.

== Tour ==
The album's tour was the band's last one and featured Gian Fabra as touring bassist, replacing Fialho.

According to manager Rafael Borges, Russo "wanted to and didn't want to perform live". He even scheduled some shows which would coincide with Brazil's matches at the World Cup. Back then, he thought he never delivered what he could on stage and always assumed the audience gave him more than they got.

Legião Urbana's last show happened at Reggae Night, in Santos, on the coast of São Paulo state. Eventually, the public started throwing cans at the band. When Russo got hit, he lied down on the ground, hiding his body from the audience, and there he sang for 45 minutes. The audience would only see his arm, which he raised up to check on his watch and make it clear to everyone that he was looking forward to the end of the show.

== Covers ==
Argentinian punk rock band Attaque 77 covered "Perfeição".

== Sales and certifications ==
| Country | Certification | Sales |
|---|---|---|
| Brazil (Pro-Música Brasil) | 3× Platina | 430.000+ |

== Bibliography ==
- Conversações com Renato Russo. Campo Grande: Letra Livre. 1996. ISBN 978-85-86399-02-2.
- Fuscaldo, Chris (2016). Discobiografia Legionária. São Paulo: LeYa. ISBN 978-85-441-0481-1.
