= Dois (album) =

Studio album by Legião Urbana
- Released: July 1986
- Recorded: January/March 1986
- Genres: Post-punk; new wave; folk rock; jangle pop
- Length: 47:01
- Label: EMI-Odeon
- Producer: Mayrton Bahia

Legião Urbana chronology
| Legião Urbana (1985) | Dois (1986) | Que País É Este (1987) |

Singles from Dois
- 1. "Tempo Perdido" Released: 1986; 2. "Eduardo e Mônica" Released: 1986; 3. """Índios""" Released: 1987; 4. "Quase sem Querer" Released: 1987; 5. "Acrilic on Canvas" Released: 1987

Dois (transl. Two) is the second studio album by Brazilian rock band Legião Urbana. It was released in July 1986 and produced by Mayrton Bahia, which was at that time assigned by EMI-Odeon to produce the label's newcomers. The booklet has a picture of a couple hugging each other and photographed from behind; it was taken by Ico Ouro Preto, former guitarist turned-photographer of the band.

== Background ==
The success of previous album (which by then had already sold 100,000 copies) made vocalist, acoustic guitarist and keyboardist Renato Russo contemplate releasing their sophomore album as a double one, with the title Mitologia e Intuição (Mythology and Intuition). The label wasn't impressed with the idea and the album was done as a single one, having its repertoire reduced from 20 tracks to 12.

Russo was experiencing the "second album syndrome", as guitarist Dado Villa-Lobos said. Legião Urbana's critical and commercial success made him want to surpass the achievements on the second release. Drummer Marcelo Bonfá said the album "was really a challenge, because we had a deadline to create and there was much expectation, both from the label and from the band itself.

The production of Dois was assigned to Mayrton Bahia, who was usually designated by EMI-Odeon back then to produce new artists. The album ended up being the band's most commercially successful one, helped by the success of "Eduardo e Mônica", a song that was considered difficult due to the lack of a chorus. The album sold over 1.8 million copies.

== Songwriting ==
About the album's lyrics, Russo said, following its release:

While we are distancing from the external referential - government, politics, state, pollution - in this second [album] we are totally interiorizing. We no longer have songs such as 'Soldados' or 'O Reggae' because we already said that. I won't spend my whole life talking about school, now we're talking about the emotional and affectionate relationship between people. In the first album, we had to knock the door with lots of strength. With the second one, we can say things without the need to shout, because the door is already open.

The band composed in a manner that was considered "unusual". Sometimes they presented a rhythm section with no melody, or they came up with fragments of songs without even knowing where they would be used. Besides that, they started to work more with acoustic guitars. "Andrea Doria" was one of the tracks that received some parts with the instrument in order to please the members.

The album's mixing was also toilsome. The album was recorded through 16 channels and many times the instruments would end up mixed together and would have to be separated with handicraft-like methods. Tracks were constantly edited, many times by three people at once. It was during this album's recording sessions that the band started to accept more effects in their music.

=== Song information ===
"Central do Brasil" – this track wold work as a thematic and instrumental bridge for eventual problems of incompatibility between the individual differences of the other songs, an interaction between electric and acoustic (in regards to the instrumental texture) and the oblique in contrast with the accessible (lyrics and thematic), being useful also as a complement in regards to the timing (determining the balance between the length of sides 1 and 2). The standoff has a solution, however: it'll suffice that the acoustic tracks, due to allowing closer grooves, allow for a longer length on each side, with no damage to the quality of fine sound reproduction.

— Renato Russo, on a letter sent to EMI with album notes

A verse from "Tempo Perdido" inspired the title of Russo's biopic Somos Tão Jovens (We're So Young). It was already part of the live repertoire of the band before being recorded.

"Fábrica", just like "Perfeição" (from O Descobrimento do Brasil), was covered in Spanish by Argentinian band Attaque 77.

The album opener "Daniel na Cova dos Leões" starts with some radio chatter, some sections of the previous album's "Será" and parts of the Socialist International's Anthem. "Plantas Embaixo do Aquário" mentions the Cold War. In order to add it to the album's final track list, Russo took inspiration from a letter Bahia wrote him after he realized the musician felt highly pressured.

"Acrilic on Canvas" had its lyrics written under consultancy by two Brasília friends who were familiar with painting techniques. One of them pointed to an inconsistency in the title, since acrylic cannot be mixed, and suggested it be renamed as "Oil on Canvas", which Russo denied, claiming "poetic license".

"Química", which would be in the group's next release, is featured in Dois as a bonus track, but only in the cassette version, in a different arrangement than the one that would be released on Que País É Este.

"Andrea Doria" references the Italian ship SS Andrea Doria, which was en route to New York on 25 July 1956 and sank after colliding with Stockholm. Unlike the Titanic tragedy, most passengers were rescued and the death toll was of 51 souls, plus some Italian works of art.

== Reception ==
=== Critical reception ===
Professional ratings
Review scores
| Source | Rating |
|---|---|
| Allmusic | 4/5 stars |

By the time of its release, Dois repeated its predecessor's positive reception on the press. Luís Antônio Giron at IstoÉ called it "a mature LP which showcases how the group knew how to evolve musically and keep a poetic consistency in their songs", while his co-worker Aponean Rodrigues from IstoÉ Senhor found that the group "just dug a decisive gap among the best national groups". Heinar Maracy at Folha de S.Paulo called the group "serious, sober and respectable" and the album "dense without being elaborate, similar to a single sip", although he criticized ""Índios"", which he described as "poetry that seemed to be forced into a song". At Correio Braziliense Paulo Pestana said "we have before ourselves a masterpiece, an album that's even more perfect than the first LP, but enough for the group's complete maturation.

In 2007, the Brazilian edition of Rolling Stone magazine featured Dois in the 21st position on a list of the 100 greatest Brazilian albums. In September 2012, it was elected by the audience of Radio Eldorado FM, of Estadao.com e of Caderno C2+Música (both the latter belong to newspaper O Estado de S. Paulo) as the third best Brazilian album ever. By the time of the album's release, the newspaper also said: "You bite it and see there is meat there. Bleeding. The little taste of Smiths on side A, with lyricist and vocalist Renato Russo singing a lot on Daniel na Cova dos Leões or Tempo Perdido, actually just prepares the ground for the punch of side B, as in Metrópole and Fábrica."

In 2022, it was elected as one of the best Brazilian music albums of the last 40 years by a O Globo poll which involved 25 specialists, including Charles Gavin, Nelson Motta, and others.

=== Commercial reception ===
| Country | Certification | Sales |
|---|---|---|
| Brazil (Pro-Música Brasil) | Diamond | 900.000+ |

== Track listing ==
Side A
| No. | Title | Writer(s) | English title | Length |
|---|---|---|---|---|
| 1. | "Daniel na Cova dos Leões" | Renato Russo/Renato Rocha | Daniel in the Lions' Den | 4:00 |
| 2. | "Quase Sem Querer" | Dado Villa-Lobos/Renato Russo/Renato Rocha | Almost Unintentionally | 4:40 |
| 3. | "Acrilic on Canvas" | Dado Villa-Lobos/Renato Russo/Marcelo Bonfá | | 4:40 |
| 4. | "Eduardo e Mônica" | Renato Russo | Eduardo and Mônica | 4:31 |
| 5. | "Central do Brasil" | Renato Russo | Brazil Central [Station] | 1:34 |
| 6. | "Tempo Perdido" | Renato Russo | Wasted Time | 5:02 |

Side B
| No. | Title | Writer(s) | English title | Length |
|---|---|---|---|---|
| 1. | "Metrópole" | Renato Russo | Metropolis | 2:49 |
| 2. | "Plantas Embaixo do Aquário" | Dado Villa-Lobos/Renato Russo/Renato Rocha/Marcelo Bonfá | Plants Under the Aquarium | 2:54 |
| 3. | "Música Urbana 2" | Renato Russo | Urban Music 2 | 2:40 |
| 4. | "Andrea Doria" | Dado Villa-Lobos/Renato Russo/Marcelo Bonfá | | 4:53 |
| 5. | "Fábrica" | Renato Russo | Factory | 4:56 |
| 6. | ""Índios"" | Renato Russo | "Indigenous People" | 4:17 |
| 7. | "Química" (Hidden track exclusive to the cassette version) | Renato Russo | Chemistry | 2:15 |
| Total length: | | | | 46:41 |

== Personnel ==
- Renato Russo - vocals, keyboards, rhythm guitar, acoustic guitar, bass guitar (on "Acrilic on Canvas" and "Eduardo e Mônica")
- Dado Villa-Lobos - lead guitar
- Renato Rocha - bass guitar, keyboards (on "Acrilic on Canvas")
- Marcelo Bonfá - drums, percussion
