= A Tempestade ou O Livro dos Dias =

Studio album by Legião Urbana
- Released: September 20, 1996
- Recorded: AR Records, Rio de Janeiro City; January/June 1996
- Genres: Alternative rock; art rock
- Length: 67:03
- Label: EMI-Odeon
- Producer: Dado Villa-Lobos

Legião Urbana chronology
O Descobrimento do Brasil (1993)	A Tempestade ou O Livro dos Dias (1996)	Uma Outra Estação (1997)

A Tempestade ou O Livro dos Dias (transl. The Storm or The Book of Days) is the seventh studio album by Brazilian rock band Legião Urbana. It was released on September 20, 1996, and it is the last Legião Urbana album released in vocalist, bassist, acoustic guitarist and keyboardist Renato Russo's lifetime; he would die three weeks later.

It has sold more than 1.1 million copies in Brazil and received a Double Platinum Certification by ABPD.

== Background ==
A Tempestade ou O Livro dos Dias was recorded in a period of relapse of vocalist, acoustic guitarist and keyboardist Renato Russo, who was clean when the band recorded the previous album O Descobrimento do Brasil.

Around that time, Russo was also finishing his second solo album, Equilíbrio Distante, while the other two members (guitarist Dado Villa-Lobos and drummer Marcelo Bonfá) joined EMI-Odeon artistic manager João Augusto to remaster the group's six previous albums and release them in a box set titled Por Enquanto – 1984/1995 (Meanwhile - 1984/1995).

== Recording ==
A Tempestade ou O Livro dos Dias was recorded from January 1996 on at AR Estúdios, in Barra da Tijuca. They had a disagreement with the place as soon as they started to work on the album because the facilities had not been booked exclusively for them. Russo found in it another reason not to closely follow the album's production. Meanwhile, session keyboardist Carlos Trilha started to follow pretty much all the group's work. Unlike the previous album, this one did not involve any use of Pro Tools.

It was intended to be a double-album, but Russo was against it, fearing an excessively high final price. The other members ended up agreeing in releasing only A Tempestade once they realized Russo wouldn't live much longer. Back then, Russo was already quite thin and weakened. Bonfá preferred the name O Livro dos Dias, a phrase found in the first part of the booklet, which also had a quote by Oswald de Andrade: "Brazil is a federative republic full of trees and people saying goodbye". It's the only album by the band without the motto Urbana Legio Omnia Vincii ("Legião Urbana wins everything", in Latin).

Due to his poor health, Russo only recorded guide vocals and never returned to the studio to record the final versions. The only exception was "A Via Láctea", with autobiographical elements and that he wanted to send to the radio stations. Jorge Davidson, artistic director that took the band to EMI-Odeon, working at Sony at the time, was invited by Russo for a visit to listen to the finished album. He recommended that Russo re-recorded his voice, but the vocalist refused again. It was the last time they met.

Russo would be updated about progress on the album by Villa-Lobos, who called him every day. Besides, he would receive tapes from roadie Reginaldo Ferreira, who also returned them to the guitarist afterwards.

Russo disapproved most of his band mates' work. After listening to the almost-finished material, he said "the only useful thing there was the metronome click". He even had an argument with Trilha for calling him late every night to express disapproval of his performances.

Bonfá also commented he avoided staying in the studio longer than necessary since the atmosphere there was sad.

In his last contact with Russo, Ferreira called him to ask him what he thought of the final product, to which Russo replied: "I'm yet to define the male and female of the album", a sentence Ferreira never understood.

== Reception ==
=== Critical reception ===
Professional ratings
Review scores
Source	Rating
AllMusic	4/5 stars

The AllMusic review by Alvaro Neder awarded the album 4 stars, stating "Sad and melancholic, it sold 500,000 copies right after Russo's demise, with the group selling five million copies in their 12 years of existence. They recorded 36 songs for this album, originally intended to be double. But several songs remained unpublished, including 'A Tempestade', vetoed by Renato himself because was much too depressed, talking about suicide—this describes the last love affair's end, with a guy called Cristiano. 'Clarice', another of the unpublished songs, talks about a 14-year-old girl who attempts suicide. The album had the hits 'Leila' (a good-humored revision of 'Eduardo e Mônica'), 'L'Avventura', the melancholic 'A Via Láctea' ('essa febre que não passa/this fever that doesn't end'), 'Dezesseis' (another adolescent account like 'Faroeste Caboclo'), and 'Aloha' (revision of 'Geração Coca-Cola' after one decade)".

=== Commercial reception ===
The album sold 1.1 million copies, being one of the best-selling albums of 1996 and of the band. The tracks with most airplay were "A Via Láctea" and "Dezesseis"; with "L'Avventura", "Esperando por mim"and other enjoying limited success.

== Track listing ==
All lyrics are written by Renato Russo; all music is composed by Dado Villa-Lobos, Russo & Marcelo Bonfá, except "Longe Do Meu Lado" (Russo, Bonfá), "Soul Parsifal" (Russo, Marisa Monte) & 1º De Julho (Russo).

No.	Title	English title	Length
1.	"Natália"		3:55
2.	"L'Avventura"	The Adventure	4:37
3.	"Música De Trabalho"	Worksong	4:19
4.	"Longe Do Meu Lado"	Far Away From My Side	4:25
5.	"A Via Láctea"	The Milky Way	4:39
6.	"Música Ambiente"	Ambient Music	4:07
7.	"Aloha"		5:25
8.	"Soul Parsifal"		4:54
9.	"Dezesseis"	Sixteen	5:23
10.	"Mil Pedaços"	A Thousand Pieces	3:22
11.	"Leila"		5:22
12.	"1º De Julho"	July 1	4:49
13.	"Esperando Por Mim"	Waiting For Me	4:21
14.	"Quando Você Voltar"	When You Come Back	2:53
15.	"O Livro Dos Dias"	The Book Of Days	4:18

== Covers ==
Ricky Martin made a Spanish-language cover of "A Via Láctea" named "Gracias por Pensar en Mi" ("Thanks for Thinking of Me").

== Personnel ==
Legião Urbana

- Renato Russo – lead vocals, bass guitar, acoustic guitar
- Dado Villa-Lobos – electric guitar, vocals
- Marcelo Bonfá – drums, ocarina, percussion, vocals

Additional personnel

- Carlos Trilha – keyboards, drum machine, acoustic bass

== Sales and certifications ==
Country	Certification	Sales
Brazil (Pro-Música Brasil)	Diamond	996.000+
