= Grupo Leya =

Portuguese multinational book publishing company

- Type: Publishing House
- Industry: Books, Publishing
- Founded: 2007
- Headquarters: Lisbon, Portugal
- Area served: Portugal, Brazil, Angola, Mozambique
- Key people: Miguel Pais do Amaral (Chairman); Tiago Morais Sarmento (CEO); Isaías Gomes Teixeira (CEO);
- Products: Books
- Number of employees: 500
- Website: [www.leya.com]

Grupo Leya is a Portuguese multinational book publishing company established in January 2007 as a holding company incorporating some of the biggest Portuguese and Brazilian publishers and two of the largest African publishers. LeYa is the largest general-interest trade book publisher but it also publishes fiction, nonfiction and children's books, being also one of the most important Portuguese textbook and study book publisher.

Isaías Gomes Teixeira, a board member, has announced in 2008 that Leya's revenue target was c. 90M Euros and that they aimed to publish around 1,000 different books in 2008.

Some of the notable authors Grupo Leya represents are some of the most renowned writers in the Portuguese-speaking world, including Lobo Antunes, José Eduardo Agualusa amongst others.

== Subsidiaries ==
- Texto Editores created in 1977, based in Amadora, Portugal.
- Edições Asa, founded in 1951 and acquired in 2007
- Editorial Caminho, founded in 1975, acquired in 2007 and best known for publishing José Saramago works.
- Dom Quixote, founded in 1965 and acquired from Planeta in 2007.
- Gailivro, founded in 1987 and acquired in 2007.
- Nova Gaia, founded in 1985 and acquired in 2007.
- Oficina do Livro and Casa das Letras, the former publishing company of Diário de Notícias, acquired in 2008.
- Academia do Livro
- Caderno
- Estrela Polar
- Livros d'Hoje
- Lua de Papel
- Ndjira, from Mozambique
- Novagaia
- Nzila, from Angola
- Quinta Essência
- Sebenta
- Teorema

== Investors ==
It was announced in August 2011 that Trilantic Capital Partners had purchased of a minority stake in Grupo Leya for US $66 million in January.
