= Legião Urbana (album) =

Studio album by Legião Urbana
- Released: January 2, 1985
- Recorded: October/December 1984
- Genres: Post-punk; new wave; punk rock
- Length: 37:09
- Label: EMI-Odeon
- Producer: José Emilio Rondeau

Legião Urbana chronology
Legião Urbana (1985)	Dois (1986)

Singles from Legião Urbana
- 1. "Será" Released: 1985; 2. "Ainda É Cedo" Released: 1985; 3. "Geração Coca-Cola" Released: 1985; 4. "Teorema" Released: 1985; 5. "Soldados" Released: 1985

Legião Urbana (transl. Urban Legion) is the self-titled debut album by Brazilian rock band Legião Urbana. It was released on January 2, 1985.

"Será" was selected as the album's first single and it received a video, shot on May 25, 26 and 27, 1985 at the nightclub Rose Bom Bom, in São Paulo, directed by Toniko Melo. All tracks were already ready before the album's sessions, except for "Por Enquanto".

Legião Urbana sold a total of 550,000 copies and, in 2007, the Brazilian edition of Rolling Stone magazine elected Legião Urbana as 40th in the 100 Greatest Brazilian Music Records.

The artwork on the album cover was designed by drummer Marcelo Bonfá.

== Background ==
In the early 1980s, then future leader of Legião Urbana Renato Russo was a friend of the already-established band Os Paralamas do Sucesso. Their debut album, Cinema Mudo, was in production stages and would include "Química", a song written by Russo. Jorge Davidson, then artistic manager of EMI Odeon, the label via which the album would be released, listened to the track and wanted to know more about Russo and Legião Urbana.

After being promoted to artistic director of the national department, Davidson invited Legião Urbana to join the label, being the first band brought by him:

I called Russo because I listened to an average musician, but an excellent singer with impressive lyrics on that tape. I spoke to Russo directly and invited the band to come to Rio to record a single. He wasn't humble nor was he moved, but proved himself kind and pleasant. He asked a number of questions, as if he were already an artist in talks, and accepted the invitation.

== Production and recording ==
=== Pre-production and Renato Rocha's arrival ===
The band went to Rio de Janeiro and was initially going to record only one single with two songs, but they struggled to find a producer. Marcelo Sussekind (Herva Doce) was the first to be invited (by Davidson), but he refused. They then approached Rick Ferreira, Raul Seixas' session guitarist, but artistic differences between him and the band soon brought an end to their relationship.

When they were close to giving up, they received some incentive from Mayrton Bahia, then repertoire manager of EMI-Odeon. He explained them how the music industry worked and how they should behave in the face of a difficulty.

Two months later, the band returned to Rio with good news: they would meet Seixas in person, since he was staying at the same hotel they were; they would record a full-length album instead of a single; and they had secured themselves a producer: José Emilio Rondeau. Rondeau himself requested EMI to be the album's producer, after learning the band had signed with the company. Their relationship with Rondeau also eroded quickly, however, specially on Bonfá's behalf. The producer once even got in his car, ready to take off and abandon the album, but Russo and Bonfá begged him to stay.

In the meantime, the band hired a fourth member: bassist Renato Rocha, who became a member after Russo (also the bassist until then) lost part of his hands movements by trying to slit his own wrists. He would be quite kept to himself initially, doing nothing beyond following Russo's inputs. He did contribute, however, to "A Dança"'s arrangement.

=== Recording ===
The band wanted to produce a "simple work, without too many musical adornments and lots of authenticity". Russo recorded his voice with two valve microphones; one in front of his mouth and the other above it, in order to capture reverberation. Bonfá's drums were recorded by microphones strategically positioned all over walls and windows of the studio. Rondeau worked to fulfill the band's will to create a sound that was neither too raw, nor too artificial.

By editing "Perdidos no Espaço" with a razor blade and duct tape, he started the trend of editing recording tapes with handicraft-like methods, in a pre-digital era.

The final result did not please Russo completely. He wanted the effort to sound as if recorded live, with all members playing together. However, only "Petróleo do Futuro" reached such standard.

"Geração Coca-Cola"

"Geração Coca-Cola" was considered the most important song by the label's executives. However, Davidson only showed them the lyrics, fearing the "heavy" and "contesting" instrumentation could risk the contract. Actually, EMI-Odeon hoped for some folk; because of that, Davidson suggested the band to be inspired by Bob Seger and recorded the track on acoustic guitars. Many forms were attempted, including humorous versions and versions played as if for a party, but the one that made it to the album was "less raw, but completely loyal" to what the band wanted.

=== Sound ===
Two years after Legião Urbana's release, Russo said:

Many people said our first album is pessimistic, political, heavy and negative. I don't think so, because it's just comments on life things. 'Será' is a hopeful song. 'Geração CocaCola' points the finger because it is ironic and 'Por Equanto' speaks of longing, of the love thing. 'O Reggae' has violent lyrics about the educational system and hypocrisy in general. Although the lyrics don't offer solutions and happy endings, I don't think they're pessimist. It's a reflection of what we live.

"Ainda É Cedo" was seen by journalists Lúcio Ribeiro (Folha de S.Paulo) and Ricardo Alexandre as containing portions of "A Means to an End", by Joy Division; Alexandre specifically noticed similarities between the songs' bass lines.

== Reception and legacy ==
By the time of its release, Legião Urbana was praised by the press, including Tárik de Souza, at Jornal do Brasil ("provides new directions for Brazil Rock"; José Augusto Lemos, at Folha de S.Paulo (who picked "Ainda É Cedo" as a highlight and pointed Joy Division influences); and Antônio Carlos Miguel, at Jornal da Tarde ("radical, coherent, the Legião Urbana boys open a new way for Brazilian rock, the one with political and existential attitudes").

Writing for Allmusic, Alvaro Neder gave the album 2.5 stars and said that "like many young bands, early on they clearly lacked the confidence to assert their opinions over those of their record company" while calling "Ainda é Cedo" "unquestionably the band's first unmitigated triumph".

In 2014, an instrumental version of "Por Enquanto" was used for a Brahma TV ad for the 2014 FIFA World Cup.

In 2015, the album was re-released as Legião Urbana 30 Anos in a double-album format by Universal Music. One of the discs is the original album and the other is a compilation of re-releases.

== Track listing ==
No.	Title	Writer(s)	English translation	Length
1.	"Será"	Dado Villa-Lobos; Marcelo Bonfá; Renato Russo	Could It Be	2:30
2.	"A Dança"	Dado Villa-Lobos; Marcelo Bonfá; Renato Russo; Renato Rocha	The Dance	4:01
3.	"Petróleo do Futuro"	Dado Villa-Lobos; Renato Russo	Future's Petrol	3:02
4.	"Ainda É Cedo"	Dado Villa-Lobos; Ico Ouro-Preto; Marcelo Bonfá; Renato Russo	It's Still Soon	3:57
5.	"Perdidos no Espaço"	Dado Villa-Lobos; Marcelo Bonfá; Renato Russo	Lost in Space	2:57
6.	"Geração Coca-Cola"	Renato Russo	Coca-Cola Generation	2:22
7.	"O Reggae"	Renato Russo; Marcelo Bonfá	The Reggae	3:33
8.	"Baader-Meinhof Blues"	Dado Villa-Lobos; Marcelo Bonfá; Renato Russo		3:27
9.	"Soldados"	Marcelo Bonfá; Renato Russo	Soldiers	4:50
10.	"Teorema"	Dado Villa-Lobos; Marcelo Bonfá; Renato Russo	Theorem	3:06
11.	"Por Enquanto"	Renato Russo	For Now	3:16
Total length:				37:09

=== Legião Urbana 30 Anos (CD 2) ===
No.	Title	Writer(s)	Length
1.	"Geração Coca-Cola (demo 1983)"	Renato Russo	2:20
2.	"Ainda é cedo (demo 1983)"	Dado Villa-Lobos; Ico Ouro-Preto; Marcelo Bonfá; Renato Russo	4:41
3.	"A Dança (demo 1983) - feat. Herbert Vianna"	Dado Villa-Lobos; Marcelo Bonfá; Renato Russo	3:03
4.	"Química (Clip Pirata)"	Renato Russo	3:55
5.	"Perdidos no Espaço (Outtake)"	Dado Villa-Lobos; Marcelo Bonfá; Renato Russo	3:21
6.	"O Reggae (Outtake)"	Renato Russo; Marcelo Bonfá	4:09
7.	"Renato Apresenta"		3:28
8.	"Ainda é cedo (take 9)"	Dado Villa-Lobos; Ico Ouro-Preto; Marcelo Bonfá; Renato Russo	1:15
9.	"Será (Outtake)"	Dado Villa-Lobos; Marcelo Bonfá; Renato Russo	2:31
10.	"Chamadas de rádio"		1:04
11.	"Petróleo do Futuro (demo BSB)"	Dado Villa-Lobos; Renato Russo	2:42
12.	"Ainda é cedo (demo BSB)"	Dado Villa-Lobos; Ico Ouro-Preto; Marcelo Bonfá; Renato Russo	4:23
13.	"Teorema (demo BSB)"	Dado Villa-Lobos; Marcelo Bonfá; Renato Russo	2:35
14.	"Aduuuuuuhhh!! (live)"	Dado Villa-Lobos; Marcelo Bonfá; Renato Russo	2:40
15.	"Profecia de Renato" (Renato's prophecy)		1:39
16.	"Por Enquanto (Outtake)"	Renato Russo	2:49
17.	"A Dança (remix Mario Caldato) feat. Herbert Vianna"	Dado Villa-Lobos; Marcelo Bonfá; Renato Russo	3:04
18.	"O Reggae (remix Liminha)"	Renato Russo; Marcelo Bonfá	3:48

== Personnel ==
Legião Urbana

- Renato Russo — vocals, acoustic guitar, keyboards, bass guitar (on "Ainda é Cedo")
- Dado Villa-Lobos — electric and acoustic guitars, sound effects
- Renato Rocha — bass guitar (all but 4)
- Marcelo Bonfá — drums, percussion, glockenspiel

Technical

- Jorge Davidson — A&R
- José Emilio Rondeau — production
- Mayrton Bahia — production director
- Amaro Moço — engineering, mixing (all but 1)
- Toninho Silva — audio engineer
- Renato Luiz — mixing (on "Será"), editing (on "Por Enquanto")
- Geraldo and Rob — studio assistants
- Peter Mew — remastering at Abbey Road Studios, London in September 1995

Design

- Marcelo Bonfá — illustration
- Egeu Laus — graphic coordination
- Ricardo Leite — cover
- Maurício Valladares — photography

== Sales and certifications ==
Country	Certification	Sales
Brazil (Pro-Música Brasil)	Platinum	550.000+
