= Marcelo Bonfá =

Brazilian drummer

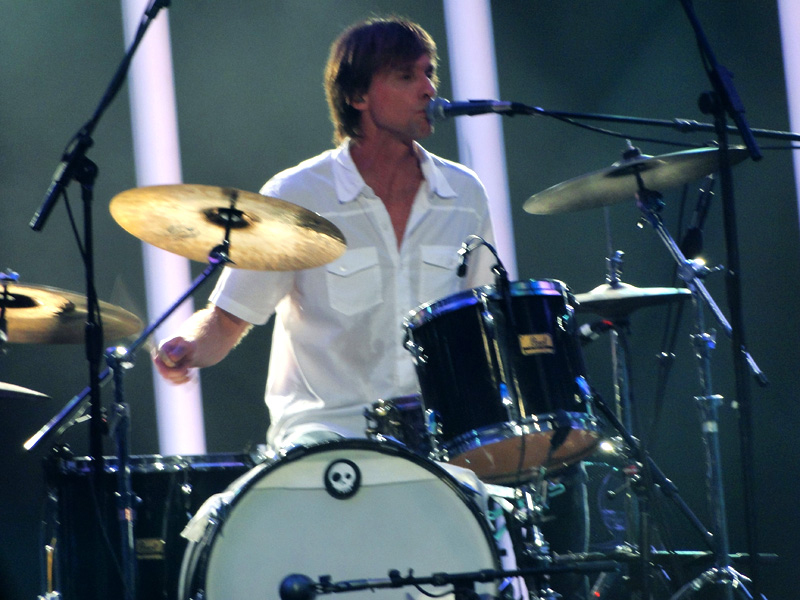
- Bonfá with Legião Urbana in 2012

Background information
- Also known as: Bonfá
- Born: Marcelo Augusto Bonfá; 30 January 1965 (age 61)
- Origin: Itapira, São Paulo, Brazil
- Genres: Post-punk, alternative rock, folk rock, punk rock, pop rock, power pop
- Occupation: Musician
- Instruments: Drums; percussion; vocals; bass; guitar; keyboards
- Years active: Late 1970s–present
- Website: marcelobonfa.com.br

Marcelo Augusto Bonfá (born 30 January 1965), also known simply as Bonfá, is a Brazilian drummer who was previously a member of the rock band Legião Urbana. After its disbanding, he pursued a solo career, and has released three albums.

== Biography ==
Bonfá was born in the city of Itapira in the state of São Paulo on 30 January 1965. His father was an employee of the Banco do Brasil, and in 1977, Bonfá's family moved to Brasília.

Bonfá played for the bands Blitz 64 and Dado e o Reino Animal (where he would meet future Legião Urbana member Dado Villa-Lobos) before forming Legião Urbana alongside Renato Russo in 1982. He stayed with Legião until its disestablishment in 1996.

In 2000, Bonfá released his first solo album, named O Barco Além do Sol (The Boat Beyond the Sun). It would be followed by 2004's Bonfá + Videotracks and 2007's Mobile.

In 1988, Bonfá had a son with actress Isabela Garcia, named João Pedro Bonfá, who is also a musician.

In 2012 he formed the band Bonfá e Os Corações Perfeitos, releasing two songs via his official website.

== Discography ==
=== With Legião Urbana ===
- Legião Urbana (1985)
- Dois (1986)
- Que País É Este (1987)
- As Quatro Estações (1989)
- V (1991)
- Música P/ Acampamentos (1992)
- O Descobrimento do Brasil (1993)
- A Tempestade, ou O Livro dos Dias (1996)
- Uma Outra Estação (1997)
- Mais do Mesmo (1998)
- Acústico MTV (1999)
- Como é Que Se Diz Eu te Amo (2001)
- As Quatro Estações ao Vivo (2004)

=== Solo albums ===
- O Barco Além do Sol (2000)
- Bonfá + Videotracks (2004)
- Mobile (2007)

== See also ==
- Legião Urbana
- Brazilian rock
