= Faroeste Caboclo =

1987 song by Legião Urbana

Single by Legião Urbana

from the album Que País É Este 1978/1987
- Released: 1987
- Genre: Folk rock; art rock; hard rock
- Length: 9:03
- Label: EMI-Odeon
- Songwriter: Renato Russo
- Producer: Mayrton Bahia

Legião Urbana singles chronology
"Angra dos Reis" (1987)	"Faroeste Caboclo" (1987)	"Eu Sei" (1987)

"Faroeste Caboclo" (English: Caboclo Western) is a song composed in 1979 by Renato Russo and recorded by Brazilian rock band Legião Urbana for the album Que País É Este 1978/1987.

The song is a lengthy ballad that depicts the story of João de Santo Cristo, a poor man from the Brazilian Northeast who moves to Brasília in search of a better life, gets involved in drug trafficking, briefly abandons the life of crime to pursue a woman and is finally murdered by a rival.

Despite its unusual characteristics for a folk song (168 different lines, no chorus and 9 minutes of playing time), "Faroeste Caboclo" was acclaimed by critics.

It is widely regarded as a Brazilian rock classic, as well as one of the greatest Brazilian rock songs of all time. A film adaptation was released in 2013.

== Released and reception ==
The song, together with "Conexão Amazônica" from the same record, had its public execution and broadcasting expressly prohibited by the Division of Censorship of Public Entertainment from the Department of Federal Police of Brazil, reason why the LP of "Que País É Este 1978/1987" was sealed and its commercial sale expressly prohibited to minors under 18 years of age. While "Faroeste" was censored because of the swearing, "Conexão" was censored because it was about illegal drug trade and drug addiction, but, in "Faroeste" case, due to the extremely high popular demand for its broadcasting, its profanities were censored with a "beep" so that the song could be broadcast without further problems (the Federal Police also demanded the payment of fines for this type of offense, but in practice these were waived by their police officers). Other radio stations decided to make edits to the song, like the 89 FM "A Rádio Rock" Station, where it was made a edit of 8'49" to remove the swearing. Despite its length, the song became a massive hit, being the 24^{TH} most play song in the country in 1988.

In late 1987, when "Que País É Este 1978/1987" was released, the journalist Arthur Dapieve positively said that the song was "without a doubt, a masterpiece". He appreciated the fact that the song beginner as a country, transitioning to reggae and ending as a rock song.

== Film version ==
A movie based on the song was produced with screenplay by Marcos Bernstein, Victor Atherino and Paulo Lins. The film stars Fabrício Boliveira as João de Santo Cristo and Ísis Valverde as Maria Lúcia. Antônio Calloni, Marcos Paulo, Rodrigo Pandolfo and Felipe Abib also co-star in the film. Initially scheduled to a November 2012 release, it was postponed to May 2013.

== Certifications ==
Certifications for "Faroeste Caboclo"
Region	Certification	Certified units/sales
Brazil (Pro-Música Brasil)	2× Platinum	200,000^{‡}
^{‡} Sales+streaming figures based on certification alone.
