= Renato Rocha (bassist) =

Brazilian musician and songwriter (1961–2015)

Background information
- Also known as: Billy; Negrete
- Born: Renato da Silva Rocha; 27 May 1961; Rio de Janeiro, Guanabara, Brazil
- Died: 22 February 2015 (aged 53) Guarujá, São Paulo, Brazil
- Genres: Rock, punk rock, alternative rock, post-punk
- Occupations: Musician, songwriter
- Instrument: Bass guitar
- Years active: Late 1970s – late 1990s

Renato da Silva Rocha (27 May 1961 – 22 February 2015), affectionately known as Billy or Negrete by his close friends, was a Brazilian musician and songwriter famous for being the bassist of influential rock band Legião Urbana from 1984 until 1989. He helped to compose some of the band's most memorable songs, such as "Angra dos Reis", "Acrilic on Canvas", "Quase sem Querer" and "Daniel na Cova dos Leões".

== Biography ==
=== Early life ===
Renato da Silva Rocha was born in Rio de Janeiro in the bairro of São Cristóvão, on 27 May 1961 to parents of Afro-Brazilian descent. His family moved to Brasília in 1970, when he was nine years old, after his father, a military, was transferred there. Rocha initially lived at the W3 avenue, from 1970 to 1974. Afterwards he moved to the 306 super square, where he got acquainted with the band Tela, one of many bands that formed in Brasília during the 1970s. Despite their friendship, Rocha was never an official member of Tela.

Known for his athletic physique, Rocha got his famous nickname "Negrete" after joining the AABB volleyball team; it was initially written as "Negrelle", referencing the famous volleyball player José Osvaldo da Fonseca Marcelino (a.k.a. Negrelli), who began his career playing for the club and partook of the 1972 Summer Olympics in Munich, Germany. It later became "Negrete" as an inside joke of his friends, saying it was too "French-sounding".

Rocha later moved to 16 super square, where he befriended Geruza, a former member of punk bands Escola de Escândalos and Blitz 64. Through Geruza he would get acquainted with André Pretorius, Fê Lemos and Renato Russo, of Aborto Elétrico, and Marcelo Bonfá.

=== Career ===
Rocha's first band was Gestapo, which alongside him was also composed of Lulu Gouveia, Joãozinho Viradinha (who later became a gospel singer) and Judas. Concomitantly he was also a member of Smegma and Hosbond Kama. In 1981 he formed Dents Kents, alongside Fred (vocals), future Plebe Rude member Jander Bilaphra (drums) and Feijão (electric guitar). The band broke up the following year.

In late 1984 he was invited to join Legião Urbana as bassist, after Renato Russo was unable to record his bass parts for their then-upcoming self-titled debut album after a suicide attempt in which he tried to slash his wrists. Rocha then became a full member of the band, and was also featured on the band's two subsequent albums, Dois and Que País É Este.

Rocha left Legião Urbana in 1989, prior to the recording sessions of As Quatro Estações. In an interview given years later, he claimed that he was abruptly fired by Renato Russo, who told him, after leaving an elevator: "You're out of my band". Dado Villa-Lobos would later elaborate that the real reason of Rocha's ousting was his alcoholism, and other behavioral problems. He temporarily returned to Legião in 1997, to help finish work on the album Uma Outra Estação, which was suddenly left unfinished due to Renato Russo's death the year before; he was credited as a guest musician on the album's opening track, "Riding Song".

After his tenure with Legião Urbana Rocha briefly played for bands Cartilage and Solana Star. Cartilage reportedly managed to release two extended plays prior to their demise. By the late 1990s/early to mid-2000s Rocha had disappeared from the public eye.

=== Financial problems and death ===
On 25 March 2012, RecordTV's electronic journal Domingo Espetacular reported that Rocha was living in squalor in the streets of Rio de Janeiro. He claimed to have had troubles with alcoholism and drug abuse, and that his royalties from Legião Urbana were not enough for him to make a living. During his final years of life he was interned at a rehabilitation clinic in Cotia, São Paulo, thanks to the efforts of Renato Russo's son Giuliano Manfredini.

On 22 February 2015, Rocha died following a sudden cardiac arrest at the age of 53. He was staying with a female friend at a hotel room in Guarujá since 19 February. He was buried two days later at the Cemitério Memorial Parque Paulista in Embu das Artes.

== Discography ==
=== With Legião Urbana ===
- 1985: Legião Urbana
- 1986: Dois
- 1987: Que País É Este
- 1997: Uma Outra Estação
