= Legião Urbana =

Brazilian rock band

- Legião Urbana in 1987. From left to right: Renato Rocha, Renato Russo, Marcelo Bonfá and Dado Villa-Lobos.

Background information
- Origin: Brasília, DF, Brazil
- Genres: Post-punk; alternative rock; punk rock; jangle pop; new wave
- Years active: 1982–1996
- Label: EMI
- Past members: Renato Russo; Dado Villa-Lobos; Marcelo Bonfá; Renato Rocha; (see Members section for others)
- Website: legiaourbana.com.br

Legião Urbana (Portuguese for Urban Legion) was a Brazilian rock band formed in 1982 in Brasília, Distrito Federal. The band primarily consisted of Renato Russo (vocals, guitar, bass, keyboards), Dado Villa-Lobos (guitar), Renato Rocha (bass), and Marcelo Bonfá (drums, keyboards). Rocha left the band in 1989, and the band continued as a trio until their disbandment, with Russo becoming the band's de facto bassist after Rocha's departure. Following Rocha's death in 2015, Villa-Lobos and Bonfá are the last surviving members of the band's principal lineup.

While Legião Urbana disbanded officially in 1996, after Russo's death from AIDS, yet today they are considered one of the most influential Brazilian rock bands in music history, alongside Os Mutantes, Titãs, Os Paralamas do Sucesso, and Barão Vermelho, and are considered to be pioneers of Brazilian rock.

== History ==
=== The beginning ===
Renato Russo (born Renato Manfredini, Jr.) founded Legião Urbana in 1982 in Brasília, after leaving his previous band Aborto Elétrico ("Electric Abortion"). Aborto Elétrico broke up due to repeated disagreements between Russo and brothers Flávio and Fê Lemos, his bandmates. After Aborto Elétrico split and Russo created Legião Urbana, the two brothers would also go on to found Capital Inicial.

Legião Urbana was initially formed by Renato Russo (vocals and bass) Marcelo Bonfá (drums), Eduardo Paraná (guitars) and Paulo Paulista (keyboards), but Paraná and Paulista would quickly leave the band. Ico Ouro Preto replaced Paraná as the guitarist. Dado Villa-Lobos replaced Ouro Preto in 1983. In the beginning of 1984, Renato Rocha joined the group as the bass player. Renato Russo would then focus on the vocals. He also played keyboards and acoustic guitar.

Many elements helped shape the identity of Legião Urbana. Russo was heavily influenced by Joy Division, The Smiths and U2.

Thematically, Russo and the other members were also influenced by literature, especially that of Portuguese poet Luís de Camões, whose poetry is featured in more than one of the band's songs.

=== Legião Urbana ===
Legião Urbana's self-titled first album was recorded and released in 1985. The album included the hits "Será" ("Could It Be"), "Ainda É Cedo" ("It's Still Early") and "Geração Coca-Cola" ("Coca-Cola Generation"). The album was released on the EMI label, and the band would stay with this record label for their entire career, with both positive and negative experiences.

=== Dois ===
In 1986, the band released Dois ("Two" – the album was planned to have two discs, but EMI refused to do it). The lyrics, melodies and personality of Renato Russo brought the band considerable notoriety in Brazil, especially among the younger generation which had grown up under the fear of the authoritarian Brazilian Military Dictatorship (1964–1985). The songs Tempo Perdido ("Lost Time"), Quase sem Querer ("Almost by Accident"), Eduardo e Mônica, Andrea Doria and "Índios" ('"Indians"') were particularly popular. The song "Indios" is particularly culturally relevant as it mentions Brazil's troubled history with indigenous people, and remains one of the band's most popular songs to this day.

=== Que País É Este ===
The band's success was cemented in 1987, with Que País É Este ("What Country Is This"). They developed a devoted following, and the band came to carry the nickname "Religião Urbana" (meaning "Urban Religion"), something Renato Russo professed to hate.

This was the heaviest album Legião Urbana released during its existence, the only one which can be classified as punk rock. Two of the songs, "Conexão Amazônica" ("Amazonic Connection" – censored to contain heavy texts about drug trafficking and its routes via the Amazon, and critical intellectuals.) and the Dylan-esque "Faroeste Caboclo" – the latter with 168 different lines and ten minutes long – were censored because they contained what was then considered obscene content. "Faroeste Caboclo" was a huge success, nevertheless. Others, such as Que País é Este? ("What Country Is This?"), Eu Sei ("I Know"), Química ("Chemistry"), Angra dos Reis (a reference to a homonymous nuclear power plant that exists in Brazil) and Mais do Mesmo ("More of the Same") were hits.

In the first concert in Brasília after the release of their first album, 200 people were wounded in a riot. The band would never again perform publicly in Brasília, the city from which Russo and other band members hailed.

=== As Quatro Estações ===
In 1989, before the release of As Quatro Estações ("The Four Seasons"), Renato Rocha decided to quit under pressure from Bonfá and Villa-Lobos. Russo returned to play bass, but he joined three touring musicians (bassist Bruno Araújo, keyboardist Mu Carvalho and guitarist Fred Nascimento). Although this album had the most financial success of any released by the group (and nearly every song on the disc garnered significant radio play), many fans disliked the big changes in the band's style, especially punk rock fans. The songs would now talk about love and soul. "Pais e Filhos" ("Parents and children"), about broken, intact, happy and dysfunctional families, included the lyrics "É preciso amar/as pessoas como se não houvesse amanhã/Porque se você parar/pra pensar/Na verdade não há" ("We must love people as if there was no tomorrow/Because if you stop to think about it/There really isn't").

=== 1990s ===
V was released in December 1991, considered the band's darkest and most introspective album until then; at this point, the band was appearing less and less in public, doing only a few (very contentious) concerts. The album ran a long gamut of emotions and topics, with songs about drug abuse, the confused sentiments of a soul consecrated to a life of celibacy, and even the bizarre, classic French film The Golden Age.

"Metal Contra as Nuvens" ("Metal Against the Clouds") clocked in at 11 minutes and is the longest song ever recorded by the band. Some of the more popular entries on the album are O Teatro dos Vampiros ("The Theater of the Vampires"), Sereníssima ("Most Serene"), Vento no Litoral ("Coastal Wind"), and O Mundo Anda Tão Complicado ("The World Has Been So Complicated"). One year after V, EMI released Música P/ Acampamentos (Music 4 Camping), which is a compilation of rarities and live material. A previously unreleased song, A Canção do Senhor da Guerra ("The Warlord's Song"), which was to be in Dois and was rejected by EMI, turned into an immediate hit. The album had got featuring keyboardist Carlos Trilha and bassist Bruno Araújo, later the recording, Araújo left the band, and joined bassist Tavinho Fialho and guitarist Sérgio Serra.

The band released O Descobrimento do Brasil ("The Discovery of Brazil", alluding both to Cabral's discovery and to a new look at Brazil and its problems) in November 1993. "Giz" ("Chalk"), "Perfeição" ("Perfection"), "Vinte e Nove" ("Twenty Nine"), "Vamos Fazer um Filme" ("Let's Make A Movie") and "La Nuova Gioventù" (Italian for "The New Youth") are the main hits of the CD, though the album as a whole received a rather chilly critical reception.

"Perfeição" was a scathing rebuke of Brazilian government and society, inviting the listener to celebrate everything stupid, evil and ugly about the country. The song compares Brazil to a house of marked cards, a den of thieves, and a State that is not a nation, but the song explodes any pretensions of moral superiority towards the end by remarking on, above all else, the stupidity of the person singing the song. After the energy and anger of the main body of the song, this final section is almost wistful. The music continues to race ahead, but the vocal seems to be trying to pull it back, simultaneously celebrating and undercutting the belief that perfection is achievable, at least in the heart. The song's popular success is emblematic of the political changes that had taken place in Brazil since the band's inception: it certainly could not have been distributed during the days of Brazil's military dictatorship.

The band members confessed that the track "Giz" was one of Renato Russo's favorite songs among all Legião Urbana's discography.

The same year, Russo released a solo album in English, The Stonewall Celebration Concert.

A Tempestade, ou O Livro dos Dias ("The Storm" or "The Book of Days") was recorded between January and June 1996 and released on 20 September 1996. This would be the last album released before Renato Russo's death less than a month later. This album surpassed V in terms of introspection and sadness in the lyrics, probably related to the state of Russo's health.

=== Disbanding ===
In January 1995 the band performed its last concert. In December Renato Russo released his second solo album, Equilíbrio Distante. A posthumous album recorded between January and June 1996 and released on 18 July 1997. Most of the tracks are leftovers from A Tempestade, which was originally planned as a double album. Uma Outra Estação ("Another Season") was completed by the remaining members of the band plus keyboardist Carlos Trilha and guitarist Tom Capone.

Acústico MTV: Legião Urbana is an MTV Unplugged album that was recorded on 28 January 1992 and released on 27 October 1999.

In September 1996 the band released its last album with Renato Russo still alive: A Tempestade. The CD has a very sad tone, directly connected to the fact that Russo and his health were deteriorating very quickly, both psychologically and physically.

Renato Russo would die one month after the release of Tempestade, on 11 October 1996, from an AIDS-related illness. Eleven days later, Bonfá and Villa-Lobos announced that the band was officially disbanded.

Uma Outra Estação was released in June 1997 and is the last album with previously unreleased songs, produced and finished by Villa-Lobos. In October 1999 EMI released a Live album, Acústico MTV, a concert which was presented on MTV Brasil in 1992. Another two albums, As Quatro Estações Ao Vivo and Como É Que Se Diz Eu Te Amo, are best-of compilations that achieved relative success among the fans and people whose interest in Legião Urbana grew after the death of Russo.

== Discography ==
=== Studio albums ===
- (1985) Legião Urbana
- (1986) Dois
- (1987) Que País É Este
- (1989) As Quatro Estações
- (1991) V
- (1993) O Descobrimento do Brasil
- (1996) A Tempestade ou O Livro dos Dias
- (1997) Uma Outra Estação

=== Live albums ===
- (1999) Acústico MTV: Legião Urbana
- (2001) Como É Que Se Diz Eu te Amo
- (2004) As Quatro Estações ao Vivo

=== Compilation albums ===
- (1992) Música P/ Acampamentos
- (1998) Mais do Mesmo

== Members ==
=== Principal lineup ===
- Renato Russo – lead vocals, guitars, keyboards (1982–1996; his death); bass guitar (1982–1984; 1989–1996)
- Marcelo Bonfá – drums, percussion, backing vocals (1982–1996)
- Dado Villa-Lobos – guitars, backing vocals (1983–1996)
- Renato Rocha – bass guitar, backing vocals (1984–1989; died 2015)

=== Early members ===
- Eduardo Paraná – guitars (1982)
- Ico Ouro Preto – guitars (1982–1983)
- Paulo Paulista – keyboards (1982)
