= Dado Villa-Lobos =

Belgian-born Brazilian musician (born 1965)

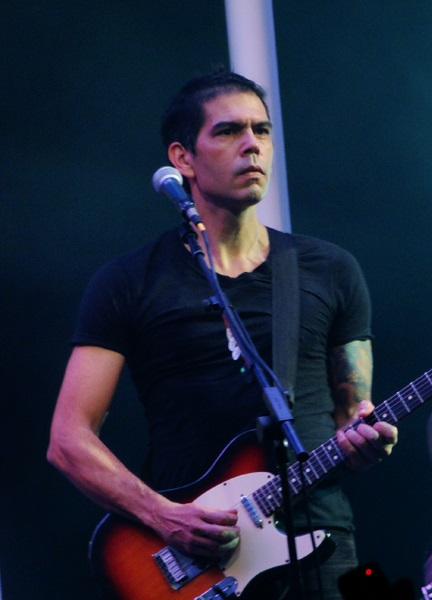
- Villa-Lobos performing with Legião Urbana in May 2012.

Background information
- Also known as: Dado
- Born: Eduardo Dutra Villa-Lobos; 29 June 1965 (age 61); Brussels, Belgium
- Genres: Post-punk; alternative rock; folk rock; punk rock; pop rock; power pop
- Occupations: Musician, songwriter
- Instruments: Guitar; mandolin; craviola; dobro; bass guitar; percussion; vocals
- Years active: 1983–present
- Label: EMI
- Formerly of: Legião Urbana
- Website: www.dadovilla-lobos.com.br

Eduardo "Dado" Dutra Villa-Lobos (born 29 June 1965) is a Belgian-born Brazilian musician, best known as the ex-guitarist of Brazilian rock band Legião Urbana. Along with singer Renato Russo and drummer Marcelo Bonfá, he was one of the founding members of that band, who formed in Brasília in 1982. Villa-Lobos remained with the band through all of their studio albums, until the group dissolved after the 1996 death of Russo. In 2005, he released his first solo album, Jardim de Cáctus, produced by Laufer.

On 30 May 2012, he attended the Tribute to Legião Urbana with Wagner Moura, where they clashed with a fan during the presentation.

== Early and personal life ==
Villa-Lobos was born in Brussels, Belgium, to a Brazilian diplomat, and also lived in Montevidéu, Uruguay until 1971, when he moved to Brazil and lived in Brasília and Rio de Janeiro. In 1975, he went back abroad, this time to Paris, France, where he spent his free time committing motorbike thefts. There, he was also diagnosed with type 1 diabetes after fainting at the Grévin. Villa-Lobos also lived in Belgrade, then part of Yugoslavia.

He is the grandnephew of Heitor Villa-Lobos.

In 2001, he was one of the people who first came to rescue Herbert Vianna after he crashed his ultralight plane into the ocean close to Villa-Lobos's house in Mangaratiba; he had flown there with his wife Lucy to attend Villa-Lobos's wife Fernanda's birthday party. The accident cost the movement of his legs and Lucy's life. The experience, which took place only five years after Renato Russo's death, impacted Villa-Lobos deeply and he started taking psychotherapy sessions.

Villa-Lobos is married to designer Fernanda and has two children: Nicolau (aged 27 in 2016), a professional poker player, and Miranda (aged 25 in 2016), a stylist.
