= Renato Russo =

Brazilian musician (1960–1996)

Background information
- Born: Renato Manfredini, Jr. March 27, 1960; Rio de Janeiro, Brazil
- Origin: Brasília, Brazil
- Died: October 11, 1996 (aged 36) Rio de Janeiro, Brazil
- Genre: Rock
- Occupations: Musician; singer; songwriter
- Instruments: Vocals; keyboards; guitar; bass
- Years active: 1978–1996
- Formerly of: Legião Urbana
- Website: renatorusso.com.br

Renato Russo (born Renato Manfredini, Jr., March 27, 1960 – October 11, 1996) was a Brazilian musician who was the lead singer of the post-punk band Legião Urbana. Before founding the band, Renato was a member of the band Aborto Elétrico, which he abandoned in 1982.

Renato died from complications caused by AIDS on October 11, 1996, who was 36 at the time.

== Early life ==
Renato Manfredini Jr. was born in Governador Island, Rio de Janeiro. He started his studies at an early age, at Colégio Olavo Bilac. During this period he wrote an essay titled "Old house, in ruins". His father was an executive at Banco do Brasil, and the family moved to New York City in 1967, when he was assigned a job in the city. Renato and his family returned later to Rio de Janeiro and moved in with his uncle Sávio. At 18 years old, he came out as bisexual to his mother, and in 1988 he made it public by writing the song "Meninos e Meninas" ("Boys n' Girls") with the chorus stating, in English, "I like St. Paul, I like St. John, I like St. Francis and St. Sebastian, and I like boys and girls."

In 1973, his family moved from Rio de Janeiro to Brasília, moving to the "Asa Sul" sector. In 1975, aged 15, Renato went through one of the hardest phases of his life when he was diagnosed as suffering from epiphysiolysis, a bone disease. He underwent surgery and had three platinum pins implanted in his pelvis. He suffered greatly throughout his convalescence, being confined to bed for 6 months, almost immobile. While he was under treatment, he did little more than listening to music, collecting an extensive and varied album collection. In an interview, Renato stated that this period was crucial in shaping his musical ear.

== Career ==
During the years of 1978 and 1979, he was the bass player of punk rock band Aborto Elétrico (Electric Abortion) which lasted 4 years, from 1978 to 1982, but broke up due to constant arguing between Fê Lemos, the drummer, and Renato. Although the band did not last long, during this period Renato Russo wrote many songs that would later become hits of Capital Inicial (founded by the remaining members of Aborto Elétrico) and Legião Urbana (founded by Renato Russo).

After the end of Aborto Elétrico, Renato began a solo career as the "Trovador Solitário" (Lonely Minstrel). This period only lasted a few months, as in 1982, he joined Marcelo Bonfá (the drummer of the band Dado e o Reino Animal), Eduardo Paraná (guitar player, known as Kadu Lambach) and Paulo Guimarães (keyboard player, known as Paulo Paulista) to form Legião Urbana. Renato was the lead vocal and bass player. Their main influences were the post punk bands of the time, especially Robert Smith from The Cure and Morrissey from The Smiths.

After the first few concerts, Eduardo Paraná and Paulo Paulista left the band. Dado Villa-Lobos then took over the guitars, creating the classic line-up of the band. The band also had Renato Rocha as a bass player from 1984 to 1989.

Leading Legião Urbana, Renato Russo reached the peak of his career as a musician, being recognized as the most important songwriter of Brazilian rock, securing a cult status within his fanbase.

He used to write long songs. The Dylan-esque "Faroeste Caboclo", for instance, lasts 9:05, "Clarisse" is 10:33 long and "Metal Contra as Nuvens" is 11:29 minutes. The song "Fátima" was written in ten minutes. He recorded two solo albums, with both English and Italian songs, in the 1990s.

== Personal life ==
During his career he had four books published and, after his death, another four books were released about him, one of them being "Conversações com Renato Russo", which contains excerpts from interviews showing his point of view on rock, bisexuality (including his own), the world, drugs and politics. He later told Folha de S. Paulo, in a 1980s interview, that he was pansexual, saying, "I am part of a minority...in this country. I consider myself pansexual".

=== Illness and death ===
Renato Russo was diagnosed HIV-positive in 1989, although he did not talk about it publicly. He suffered greatly with the side effects of the antiviral medicines he had to take: "When I take the cocktail, it's like I'm eating a dog alive. And the dog eats me from the inside". During a recording session in February 1996, he confided to friend and fellow singer Paulo Ricardo that he had stopped taking the medicines.

He died on October 11, 1996, at 1:15 a.m., weighing only 45 kilograms (99.2 pounds), due to complications caused by AIDS. He left a son, Giuliano Manfredini, at the time 7 years old. His body was cremated and the ashes were spread at the Parque Burle Marx in São Paulo – coincidentally, Legião Urbana's ex-bassist Renato Rocha was hanging out with his girlfriend at the moment of the ashes' spreading and he got a flat tire right in front of the park.

On October 22, 1996, eleven days after his death, Dado and Bonfá announced the end of Legião Urbana. The band's estimated sales in Brazil during Renato's life amounted to roughly 25 million albums. More than a decade after his death, sales of his albums are still considerable.

== Discography ==
=== Solo ===
==== Studio albums ====
- The Stonewall Celebration Concert (1994)
- Equilíbrio Distante (1995)
- O Último Solo (1997)
- Presente (2003)

=== Compilation albums ===
- Série Bis: Renato Russo - Duplo (2000)
- Série Para Sempre: Renato Russo (2001)
- Série Identidade: Renato Russo (2002)
- O Talento de Renato Russo (2004)
- Renato Russo - Uma Celebração (2006)
- O Trovador Solitário (2008)
- Renato Russo: Duetos (2010)
- Sinfônico (2013)
- Somos Tão Jovens (movie soundtrack, 2013)
