= Clube da Esquina (album) =

Studio album by Milton Nascimento and Lô Borges
- Released: March 1972
- Recorded: November 1971
- Studios: Piratininga Beach (Niterói); Odeon (Rio de Janeiro)
- Genres: MPB; baroque pop; folk; jazz pop
- Length: 64:24
- Languages: Portuguese; Spanish (track 7)
- Label: EMI-Odeon
- Producers: Milton Miranda; Lindolfo Gaya

Milton Nascimento and Lô Borges chronology
Milton (1970)	Clube da Esquina (1972)	Milagre dos Peixes (1973)

Lô Borges chronology
Clube da Esquina (1972)	Lô Borges (1973)

Clube da Esquina (Brazilian Portuguese pronunciation: [ˈklubi dɐjsˈkinɐ], in English "Corner Club") is a collaborative album by Brazilian musicians Milton Nascimento and Lô Borges, released as a double album in March 1972 by EMI-Odeon Records. It was Nascimento's fifth studio album and Lô's first, after which the latter pursued a solo career. The duo recorded the album in November 1971 at Piratininga Beach in Niterói and Odeon Studios in Rio de Janeiro, where they collaborated with musicians from the eponymous musical collective, which they helped to establish.

Musically, Clube da Esquina features a mixture of MPB, baroque pop, folk and jazz pop with elements of rock, psychedelia and classical music. Conceived at a time of political tension during Brazil's military dictatorship, it explores themes of friendship, liberty and youth. The cover, photographed by Carlos da Silva Assunção Filho, better known as Cafi, shows two boys, Cacau and Tonho, on a dirt road near Nova Friburgo, in the mountains of Rio de Janeiro, close to where Nascimento's adoptive parents lived.

Clube da Esquina initially received negative reviews from contemporary Brazilian critics, who viewed it as "poor and disposable" and did not understand the album's mixture of genres and influences. It was nevertheless commercially successful in Brazil and abroad. With the help of word of mouth and changing critical perceptions, it retrospectively received acclaim. Featured in the reference book 1001 Albums You Must Hear Before You Die (2010), Clube da Esquina was named the Greatest Brazilian Album of All Time by the Discoteca Básica podcast in 2022, with Paste ranking it as the ninth greatest album of all time in 2024.

Following its release, a sequel, Clube da Esquina 2, was released in 1978, expanding the original's collective discography, incorporating a broader range of collaborations. While sung mostly by Milton Nascimento, the album saw reduced involvement from Lô Borges and included contributions from various artists such as Elis Regina, Chico Buarque, and Francis Hime.

== Background ==
The Clube da Esquina musical collective originated in the 1960s at the corner of Divinópolis and Paraisópolis streets in Belo Horizonte, Minas Gerais, where Milton Nascimento and the Borges brothers—Lô Borges, Márcio Borges, and Marilton Borges—began collaborating. Nascimento moved to Belo Horizonte, the capital of Minas Gerais, in 1963 to study and work, meeting the Borges brothers at the Levy Building. He had left his hometown, Três Pontas, where he played in the band W's Boys with pianist Wagner Tiso, and performed at night with Marilton in the group Evolussamba.

When Lô was just ten years old, his mother asked him to go and buy eggs and milk. When he got to the street, Lô encountered a young man in his twenties playing the guitar,—Milton Nascimento. Intrigued, he approached him, leading to a connection. Nascimento would often visit Lô's home to introduce and teach him guitar and composition. A few months later, Lô met Beto Guedes, another future member of the collective, after noticing him riding a scooter through the streets. As Nascimento's career gained momentum—particularly after Elis Regina recorded his song "Canção do sal"—his collaborations with the Borges brothers and other local musicians laid the foundation for Clube da Esquina.

== Recording and production ==
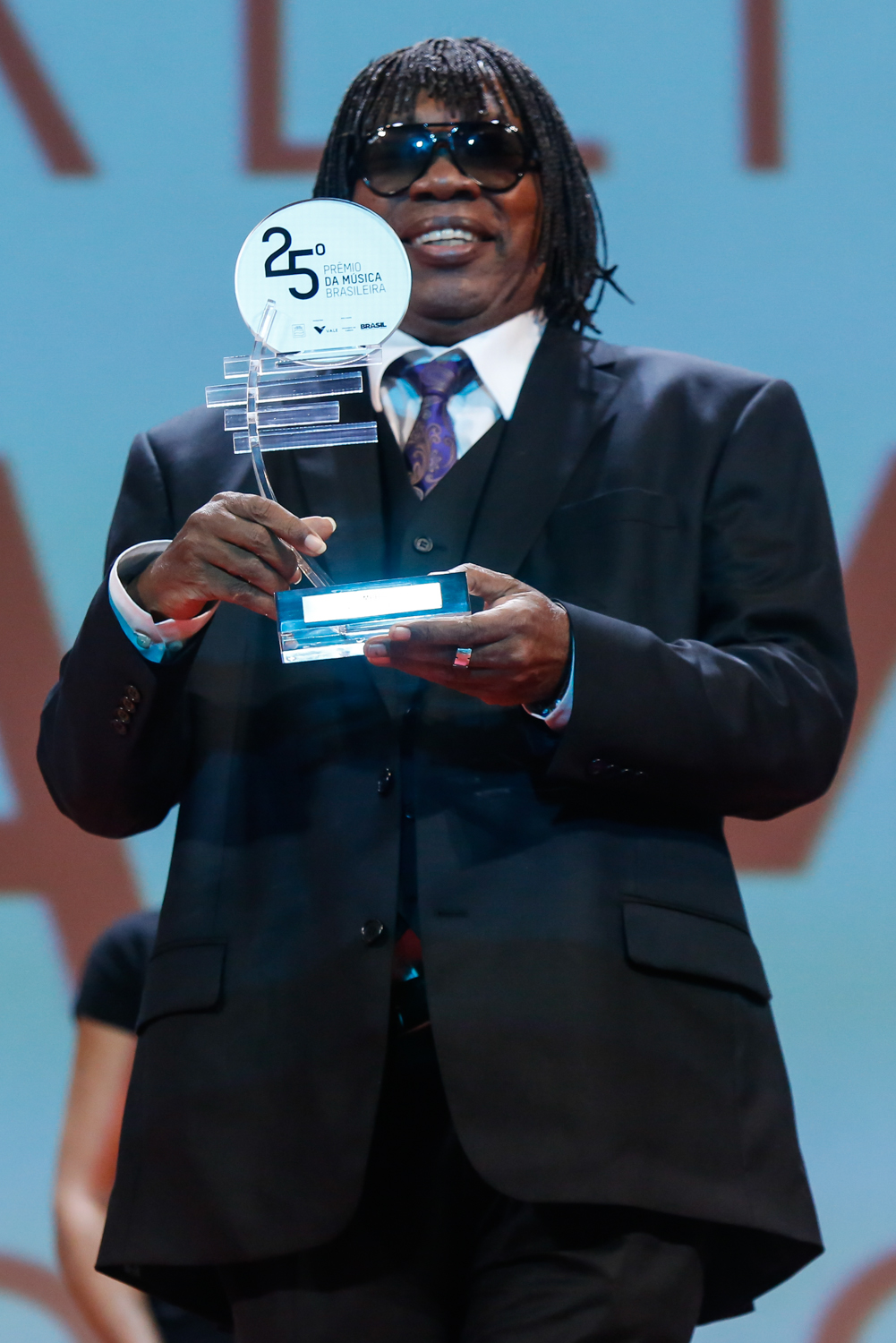
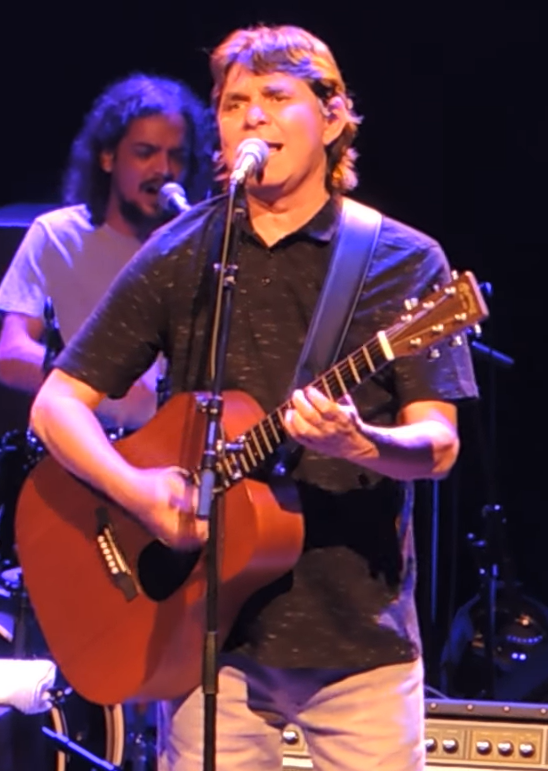
The musicians Milton Nascimento (left) and Lô Borges (right) came together to integrate and develop the album

Clube da Esquina was mostly recorded in the beach house of Piratininga, in the district of Mar Azul, Niterói, where long creative sessions and rehearsals took place, during which recordings were made in November 1971. The group stayed there for six months, while the final recordings took place both in Santa Tereza and in the bars of the city center or at the Borges brothers' house, as well as at Odeon Records' studio in Rio de Janeiro. Odeon Studios gave the Clube da Esquina collective several weeks to record, with long sessions spanning entire days and evenings, marked by an intense collaboration between the musicians, with lots of improvisation and experimentation.

The musicians alternated between roles, with Beto Guedes being the most active in the production of the album, playing 17 out of the 21 tracks, switching between bass and drums. Nascimento had selected the choosing on who would write the lyrics of each song according to his personal criterion. Márcio Borges and Fernando Brant worked on the lyrics, while musicians like Toninho Horta developed musical ideas. Orchestrations were handled primarily by Eumir Deodato and Wagner Tiso. During the recording at Odeon Studios, the album was recorded in two channels; one dedicated to vocals and the other to instruments.

The idea of a double album initially faced resistance from its label, EMI-Odeon, which feared financial and artistic losses, but the success of previous collaborations helped secure the backing of the label. Before the release of Clube da Esquina, three album auditions were held in different places: at Márcio's house, Brant's house and filmmaker Schubert Magalhães' house. The military dictatorship in Brazil imposed various restrictions on cultural production, which led artists to exile or direct confrontation with censorship. Lô Borges says that "the dictatorship was one of the worst moments we lived, but we were able to keep focus on art, songs [and] the making of the album". Márcio says that, after the production of Clube da Esquina, Nascimento and Lô began to compose more and more, to the point where they seemed, in his words, "a kind of hybrid, homogeneous, autochthonous entity, made up of two heads, four hands and two guitars". Toninho Horta described the album as "nectar, an oasis", with each song having something different, highlighting the importance of each participant's musical background. After the recording and production of Clube da Esquina, Lô Borges pursued a solo career.

== Composition ==
=== Overview ===
Clube da Esquina consists of 21 tracks that address themes such as friendship, liberty and youth, with strong presence of poetic elements. Music critics have noticed its unique fusion of musical styles, being characterized as a MPB, baroque pop, folk and jazz pop recording. It has also been described for having rock, psychedelia, bossa nova, classical music and African-American music influences. Barbara Alge has interpreted the album as reflecting a spirit of artistic freedom in contrast to the authoritarianism during the military dictatorship in Brazil. A recurring motif in the album is a road, which serves as a metaphor for life in motion and the transformations it brings.

The group drew influences from various musical styles and genres, the Beatles and Chopin being two of the most influential sources. Clube da Esquina incorporated Brazilian rhythms, jazz, and MPB into their music, drawing inspiration from the Beatles' use of diverse influences. Nascimento grew up listening to many music genres such as traditional Brazilian music, rock, jazz, samba and bossa nova played on the radio. This influenced the incorporation of guitars and keyboards into his music, reflecting the influence of rock and psychedelic music. Publications likened the recording as the Brazilian equivalents to the Beatles' Sgt. Pepper's Lonely Hearts Club Band (1967) by Robert Dimery and Magical Mystery Tour by Spanish-language newspaper El Nuevo Herald. Andy Beta of Pitchfork likened it to Western classics such as the Rolling Stones' Exile on Main St. (1972) and Bob Dylan's Blonde on Blonde (1966).

=== Songs ===
==== Tracks 1–11 ====
"O Trem Azul"
A sample of the third track, "O Trem Azul", featuring Lô Borges' vocals, reflecting the psychedelic qualities found in the song. This audio sample spans from the start of the second chorus to the guitar solo.

The opening track, "Tudo Que Você Podia Ser", presents a narrative of resignation in the face of military oppression, performed by Nascimento, which opens with a nylon-string guitar performed by Lô. The lyrics depict a young individual who, instead of resisting authoritarian rule, chooses to conform and abandon their aspirations. The song's themes reflect the broader sociopolitical climate of Brazil under dictatorship, where censorship and repression stifled dissent. "Cais", performed by Nascimento, explores themes of solitude, the lyrics suggesting a metaphorical harbor as a place of emotional refuge, contrasting the desire for freedom with an inherent sense of isolation. The song also features influences from composers such as Heitor Villa-Lobos and jazz musicians such as John Coltrane and Bill Evans. "O Trem Azul", performed by Lô, is a love song that uses the image of a train to evoke the idea of departure. The song begins with a simple guitar accompanying letters that evoke reflection and inner search, dealing with questions of identity and the relationship of the individual with the world and nature. The track conveys a liberating sensation with almost psychedelic images, described by Jonathon Grasse as a "jazzy, pop rock hit with a feel-good air". Novabrasil's Lívia Nolla noticed that the mention of a "blue train" ("trem azul" in Portuguese) can be interpreted in various ways, serving as a symbol that invites multiple readings. It may represent a personal and introspective journey or, alternatively, a reference to everyday life, with the word "trem" ('train') used as slang in Minas Gerais for any object. Leandro Aguiar says that the term could also allude to when Lô took LSD and smoked cannabis. The song has been likened with the Beatles' "Lucy in the Sky with Diamonds" by writer Paulo Thiago de Mello.

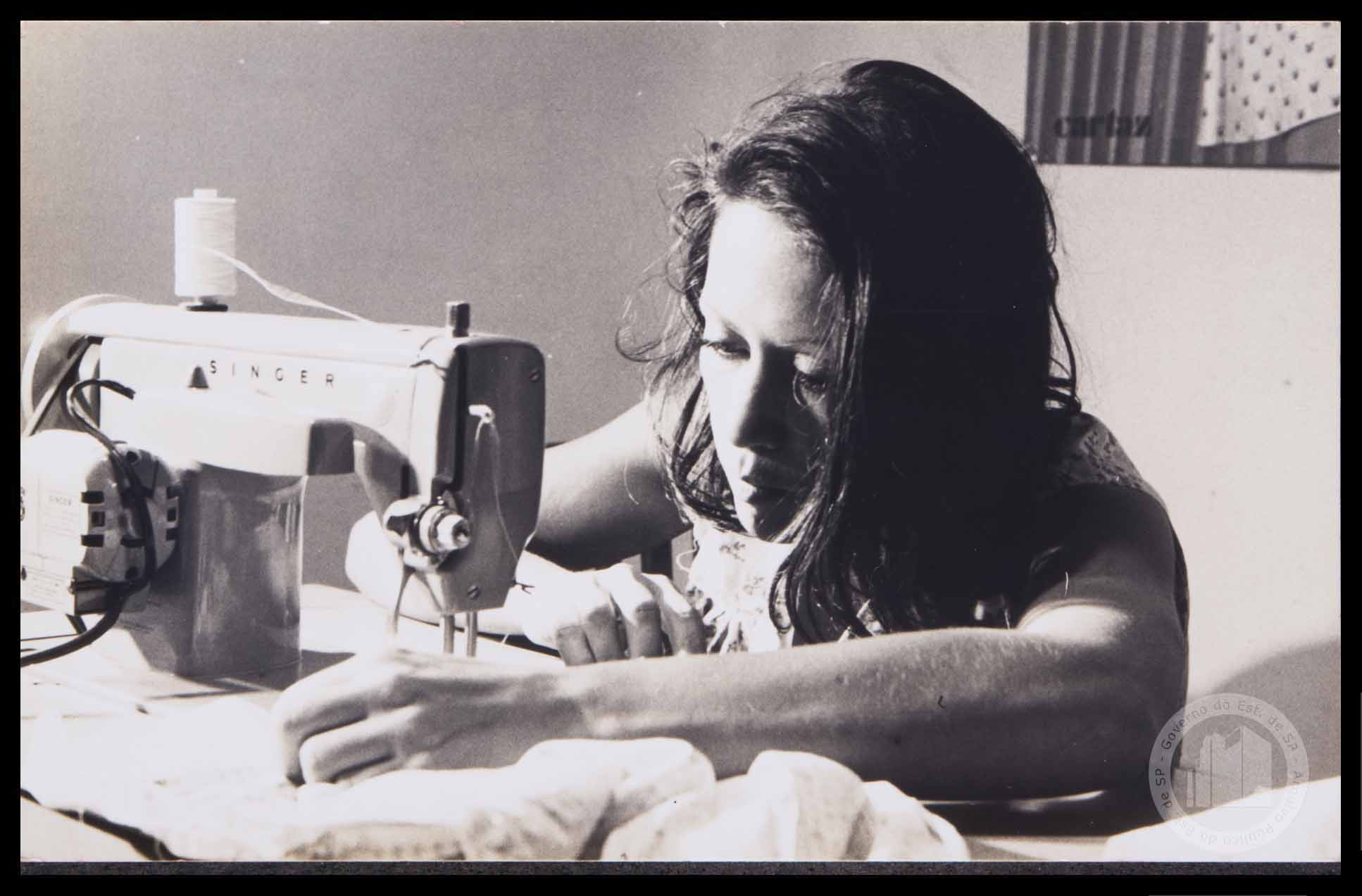
The sixth track "Cravo e Canela" is dedicated to Brazilian actress Dina Sfat (pictured), a person who had connections with Nascimento.

"Saídas e Bandeiras Nº 1", performed by Nascimento and Beto Guedes, deals with the idea of displacement and search, both physical and symbolic. The letter suggests a desire to leave, explore new territories and find something valuable, evident in lines like: "Subir novas montanhas, diamantes procurar" ('Climb new mountains, search for diamonds'). "Nuvem Cigana", performed by Nascimento, explores the theme of a road as a space of possibilities. The lyrics use images of the sun and the wind to evoke movement, unpredictability, and freedom. The opening of the song presents Beto Guedes playing a twelve-string electric guitar. The verse "pó, poeira, ventania" refers to the wind, translated as "dust, powder, gusts of wind", reinforcing the idea of uncertainty, echoing Riobaldo's statement in the 1956 novel The Devil to Pay in the Backlands that "living is very dangerous". "Cravo e Canela", performed by both singers, is a song honored to Brazilian actress Dina Sfat, who had connections with Nascimento. Its samba-influenced arrangement differs from its earlier instrumental version on Paulo Moura's 1971 track "Fibra". The song was originally written for the 1970 film Of Gods and the Undead, though it was ultimately not included in the soundtrack. It has been described as a "samba in three", shifting the sphere of congada from Minas Gerais to the rhythmic universe of samba from Rio de Janeiro.

The longest track "Dos Cruces" is a 1952 Spanish bolero written by Basque composer Carmelo Larrea, recorded by Nascimento in his own interpretation. The song explores the theme of lost and forgotten love, with a melody that expresses pain and nostalgia. Milton Nascimento discovered the song while visiting Venezuela for the Buena Onda festival in 1971. There, he befriended three locals who introduced him to different parts of Caracas, including its poorer neighborhoods, and one of them played him "Dos Cruces". "Um Girassol Da Cor De Seu Cabelo", performed by Lô, addresses themes such as love, movement and permanence. The music presents a dilemma between leaving or staying, contrasting the feeling of love, which tends to root, with the road, that symbolizes movement and change. The lyrics were inspired by Márcio Borges' first wife, Duca Leal. According to Márcio, the song was written at the beginning of their relationship during a trip to the countryside of Minas Gerais. Despite its romantic nature, the lyrics have an existential and melancholic tone, blending themes of death and hallucination, evident in lines like: "Se eu morrer, não chore, não / É só a Lua" ('If I die don't you cry, no / It's just the Moon').

"San Vicente", performed by Nascimento, evokes Latin America of the time, with references to the Andes Mountains in flames, haunted by possibilities and fears. The lyrics bring images of the sweetness of chocolate and a taste of glass and blood, as well as mentioning revolution and oppression. The song was made for the play Os Convalescentes by playwright José Vicente de Paula, which metaphorically spoke about Brazil. "San Vicente" served as a metaphor for Brazil's sociopolitical state at the time, using poetic abstraction to express the anxieties of a generation caught between resistance and exile. Gerard Béhague describes the song as a "somewhat reminiscent of Chilean tonada style". "Estrelas", performed by Lô, is the shortest track, serving as an introduction to the next track "Clube da Esquina Nº 2". Followed by "Clube da Esquina Nº 2", performed by Nascimento, is a song that described as an expression of love and friendship between Nascimento and Lô, and both with music. The song began as an instrumental partnership between Nascimento and Lô, initially without lyrics and included in the album. The composition remained without lyrics for many years until, later on, the lyricist Márcio Borges wrote the words that completed the song.

==== Tracks 12–21 ====
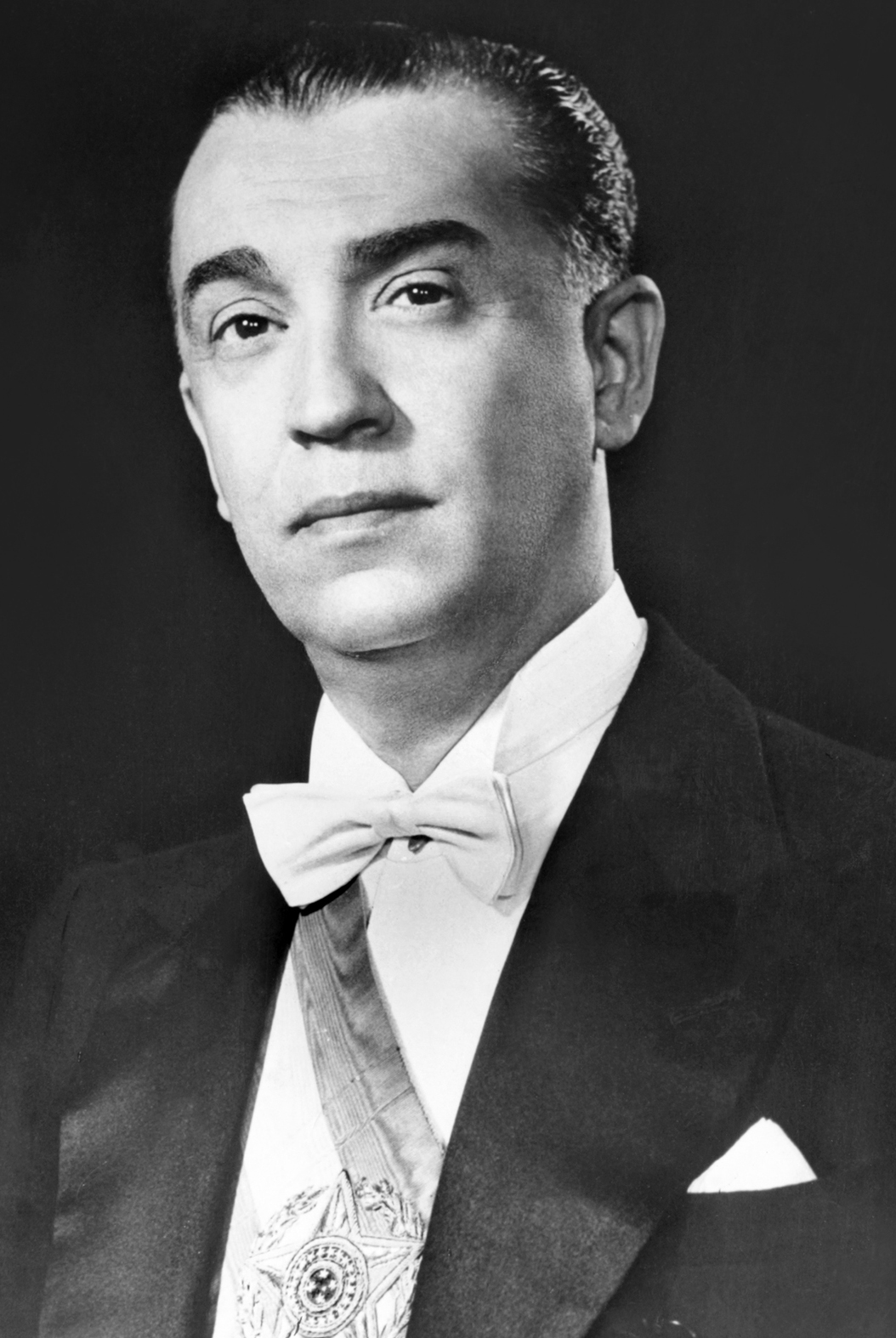
The experience in meeting former president Juscelino Kubitschek (pictured) inspired the composition of the song "Paisagem Da Janela".

The track "Paisagem da janela", performed by Lô, is a composition by Fernando Brant that emerged from a particular experience during a trip by the Clube da Esquina members to Diamantina in July 1971, where they met former Brazilian president Juscelino Kubitschek. The lyrics are a reflection of this experience, evoking the idea of travel and movement, with a look on the road, the movement and the feeling of belonging. During their stay in a colonial hotel, Brant, inspired by the view from his window overlooking a church and the town's cemetery, wrote the lyrics overnight to a melody that Lô had composed. The song is described as the most "rock and roll" song Lô composed for the album. Nascimento's recording with Alaíde Costa for "Me Deixa Em Paz" captures the sorrow of unreciprocated love with verses like "Se você não me queria / Não devia me procurar" ('If you didn't want me / You shouldn't have looked for me'). The phrase "evitar a dor" ('avoiding the pain') signals a shift in texture, introducing a jazzier rhythm and a guitar solo by Nelson Angelo. The song is a samba originally performed by Monsueto Menezes and Airton Amorim that was already part of Costa's repertoire, featuring an introspective arrangement. This arrangement stemmed from a promise made by Nascimento to Costa at the end of the 1960s during their meeting on a television music program.

"Os Povos", performed by Nascimento, evokes the image of a cemetery and a dead city. Nascimento says that, in the same 1971 Venezuelan flight, he composed the songs "Os Povos" and "Um Gosto De Sol". Both songs are a tribute to his Venezuelan friends. The song is described as "a profound song that works perfectly in a storytelling rhythm". "Saídas e Bandeiras Nº 2" is the same song as "Saídas e Bandeiras Nº 1" from a musical perspective. The difference lies in the lyrics, with the second part complementing the first. Despite their similarity in interpretation, "Saídas e Bandeiras Nº 2" ends with an instrumental section that carries the song's rhythmic and harmonic flow. "Um Gosto De Sol", performed by Nascimento, explores the theme of the passage of time and the distance between the present and the past, expressing the feeling that life is fleeing and that memories are gone. The song presents an unusual structure that intersperses moments of intimacy with orchestral expansions. Alongside "Os Povos", the song is also a tribute to his Venezuelan Friends.

"Pelo Amor De Deus", performed by Nascimento, is described by Grasse as "an experimental Brazilian ode to psychedelia", with a samba beat immersed in "a contentious sci-fi landscape of electric effects, crisp military snare drum rolls, and a polyrhythmic cowbell". The lyrics describe a character who visualizes various scenes, as in photos, in an almanac, during a supper or through a window. These scenes lead the character to exclaim the phrase "pelo amor de Deus" ('for the love of God'). The repetition of this exclamation at the end of the third stanza gains greater semantic and emotional emphasis with each repetition, with changes in melody and accompaniment. The song contains a layering of musical instruments mixed with the effect of Nascimento's voice and is the only song that uses an electric Rhodes piano. The instrumental track "Lilia", performed by Nascimento, is an art rock composition written by Milton Nascimento and dedicated to his mother. The arrangement blends diverse elements, from the percussion immersed in reverb to the asymmetrical groove shaped by Rubinho's hi-hat accents. Nascimento's wordless vocals emerge as a raw, melancholic cry, while Wagner Tiso's organ introduces a transition where Tavito's electric guitar joins in a looping pattern. Influenced by British art rock groups such as Pink Floyd, Yes, and Genesis, the song reflects the band's shared admiration for complex textures and unconventional structures, as noted by Grasse.

"Trem De Doido", performed by Lô, is a rock track with electric qualities. The lyrics describe the subject's search for their place on the train, where they are no longer afraid of the roaming rats. The "train" is interpreted as a symbol of progress, change, and unstoppable force. It also represents a way to escape oppression and find one's own path. Conversely, the "rats" symbolize cowardice, filth, and oppression. They are seen as a threat to the subject's space in the song, invading their valuable object, the "house". The refrain, with backing vocals from Nascimento, Lô, and Guedes, contrasts with the arpeggio-driven accompaniment and Tiso's organ, while the hard rock texture includes a guitar solo inspired by former Led Zeppelin member Jimmy Page. The song has been likened by Grasse with the qualities of most tracks in the Beatles' White Album. "Nada Será Como Antes" features an accelerated martial march rhythm, emphasizing an optimistic tone. The lyrics portray a poet-traveler embarking on a journey, looking toward the future with hope and a belief that tomorrow will bring change, despite current struggles. The song was originally released in the context of the military dictatorship in Brazil, and journalist Artur Xexéo observes its political character, reflecting on the difficult moment of repression and farewells, as referred to in the verse "Qualquer dia a gente se vê" ('Someday we'll see each other'). The album closes with "Ao Que Vai Nascer", blending modal and tonal systems, with the first half featuring arpeggios on the guitar that create a "mysterious atmosphere". The lyrics, with a strong political charge, reflect on Brazil's future and were altered due to censorship. Originally mentioning the government Emílio Garrastazu Médici's slogan, the altered version criticizes the idealized "country of the future".

== Title, release and cover ==
Clube da Esquina was released in March 1972 as a double album on two LP records through EMI-Odeon. In the United States, it was released through Blue Note and Capitol, in cassette and CD formats. The double LP was quickly reprinted twice in 1972 and later reissued by EMI-Odeon in 1976, 1985, 1988 and 1989. To promote the album, the album's debut show took place in the Rio de Janeiro-based theater São Sebastião Crusade, a place that was considered "weird" by Márcio Borges and Ronaldo Bastos. On stage, the musicians were not comfortable, some were nervous and tense, struggling to perform, while others, affected by alcohol, stumbled during the show, despite the restrictions on alcoholic beverages. The show was suspended due to the participants facing psychological difficulties. For instance, Tavito experienced a nervous breakdown and began screaming onstage, as did Robertinho Silva. The show was later relaunched with improved promotion.

The title Clube da Esquina (lit. 'corner club') alludes to the place where Nascimento and the Borges brothers met on the corner of Divinópolis and Paraisópolis streets, in the Santa Tereza neighborhood of Belo Horizonte, Minas Gerais. The origin of the name comes from a dialogue by Lô Borges: whenever he returned to Belo Horizonte, their friends would ask "where's Lô?" and his mother would say: "Ah, Lô is on the corner, he never leaves, at the place they call Clube da Esquina. Lô spends all his time playing the guitar there." Subsequently, the musical collective and album would be baptized Clube da Esquina. The term referred to the informal gathering place of Nascimento, Lô Borges, the Borges brothers, and other musicians from Minas Gerais met to share ideas, play music, for conversations and celebrations, particularly on weekend nights, with Lô Borges frequently playing the guitar there.

The album cover features two boys, identified pseudonymously as Cacau and Tonho, on a dirt road near Nova Friburgo, close to where Nascimento's adoptive parents lived. Taken from inside a car, Carlos da Silva Assunção Filho, the photographer better known as Cafi, from Recife, Pernambuco, the album cover represented "the rurality of Clube da Esquina". Ronaldo Bastos says that "[the] photo was the following: We were in a little car, on a road like that, and there were two boys standing there. I stopped the car and said, I don't know if it was me or Cafi who said: 'Photograph this'. And he did, from the window, from inside the beetle; we took the picture and drove off. It was another photo of those photos we made—which then turned [into] a cover".

It was believed that the boys on the album cover were Nascimento and Wagner Tiso or Nascimento and Lô as children. In March 2012, Cacau and Tonho learnt about the photo after they were contacted by the Minas Gerais newspaper Estado de Minas, who asked them to recreate the cover in celebration of the album's 40th anniversary. In December of that year, they sued Nascimento, Lô and EMI (now owned by Universal Music Group) for hedonic damages and misuse of the image, seeking R$500,000 in damages. In September 2023, the Rio de Janeiro Court of Justice ruled in favor of Nascimento and Lô, having determined the case fell outside the statute of limitations; Cacau and Tonho were ordered to pay their legal costs.

=== Initial reception ===
Initial reviews for Clube da Esquina were evaluated negatively by Brazilian musical presses, with local and specialized music critics considering it "poor and disposable". Outside Brazil, it was commercially successful. Critics struggled to understand the mix of genres and influences, and the album was often compared unfavorably to the works of more established artists. According to Márcio Borges, he explains: "Naturally, the reviews were horrible. They wanted to compare Milton with Caetano and Chico Buarque, they didn't understand any of the inter-racial, international, interplanetary ecumenism proposed by Milton's timeless dissonances. They despised Chopin's findings and the Beatlemaniac zeal of Lô".

Fernando Spencer from Diário de Pernambuco described it as an "excellent album who come to confirm the composer's strength", saying that it is "one of the biggest releases in 1972". In Julio Hungria's Jornal do Brasil review, he expressed less enthusiasm, describing the album as "sensational [...] from beginning to end", but noting that "the sound[s] could get better". Walter Silva's Folha de S.Paulo review was more negative, writing: "Just read a little of the trends obeyed by American and English popular music [and] you can see that there is a big mistake in all this. And the worst that begins to appear here are the imitations of the imitation of these 'movements', which are nothing more than fads to increase sales". Paul Raebum from New Mexican newspaper Independent described the album as one of Nascimento's "finest records". American songwriter Walter Hyatt also named it one of his favorite albums by Nascimento, saying that "it may be the pinnacle of his artistic aspirations because it's just full of energy and ideas".

Commercially, the album sold well and was available in American record shops with international sections. The album was also successful among students and drop-outs in general, and the members of the group achieved commercial success as recording artists. Clube da Esquina debuted at number nine on 15 April 1972, peaking at number eight on 22 April 1972 and spent a total of five weeks at the IBOPE charts of Rio de Janeiro, reported by the Brazilian magazine Jornal do Brasil.

== Legacy and reappraisal ==
Professional ratings
Review scores
Source	Rating
AllMusic	5/5 stars
laut.de	5/5 stars
Ondarock	8.0/10
Pitchfork	9.5/10
Rolling Stone	3.5/5 stars
Stafford Post	8/10
The Times	4/5 stars

Despite its initial minor success, Clube da Esquina, with the help of word of mouth and changing critical perceptions, underwent a national reassessment over time. Its unconventional style was initially met with skepticism, as critics found its approach difficult to categorize. However, as audiences and reviewers became more familiar with its sound, the album was met with mostly positive acclaim. Eventually, the collective's name Clube da Esquina was also used to refer Nascimento, Lô and their collaborators, even those not from Minas Gerais.

Alvaro Neder on AllMusic hailed it as "a must-have", praising its rich orchestrations by Eumir Deodato and Wagner Tiso under the direction of Paulo Moura. He noticed the album's deep connection to the Minas Gerais musical collective, featuring artists like Milton Nascimento, Lô Borges, and Toninho Horta, and noted that it "covers a great number of Clube da Esquina hits", including "Tudo Que Você Podia Ser", "Cais", and "O Trem Azul", all supported by "some of the best musicians in Brazil". Andy Beta, in his review for Pitchfork, described Clube da Esquina as "one of the most ambitious albums in Brazilian music history", highlighting its "uplifting and mystifying" qualities. Renato Prelorentzou from O Estado de S. Paulo noted that the fusion of musical genres on the album "appears mainly in relatively simple melodies, turbocharged by a very sophisticated harmonization, causing an interesting and unpublished strangeness to the ears of the time". Spin magazine stated that it "wanders the Brazilian backcountry" and was "singular pop unafraid of wallowing in eerie beauty."

Will Hodgkinson, reviewing for The Times, noted that while the singer's "heavenly voice" had been affected by age, his presence alone justified revisiting the classic album. He described the album as "a message of hope" during Brazil's military dictatorship, blending "deep, haunting melodies" with elements of classical music, folk, bossa nova, and Western rock. Highlights included "Tudo Que Você Podia Ser" and "Nada Será Como Antes", with Hodgkinson comparing the melodies to "Pet Sounds-era Beach Boys, but with greater rhythmic complexity". Stafford Post's Chris Evans said that the album is "stuffed full of sumptuous, effortless melodies lavishly orchestrated and still revelling in the avenues opened up by the Beatles". Antônio do Amaral Rocha from the Brazilian edition of Rolling Stone praised the album for its "creations outside the traditional molds" and for addressing "themes that were not very common", particularly its connection to South American reality.

The album was voted the seventh best Brazilian album of all time in a list published in October 2007 by the Brazilian Rolling Stone magazine. Clube da Esquina was included in the reference book 1001 Albums You Must Hear Before You Die, published in 2010. In September 2012, it was voted the second best Brazilian album by the audience of Eldorado FM radio, the Estadão.com portal and Caderno C2+Música (the latter two belonging to the O Estado de S. Paulo newspaper). In April 2022, Spin ranked the album 19th in its list of the 50 best albums of 1972. In May 2022, the album was voted the Greatest Brazilian Album of All Time by the Discoteca Básica podcast, which was listened to 162 experts. In 2024, the album was listed ninth by the Paste magazine on the 300 Greatest Albums of All Time list.

In 1978, EMI-Odeon released Clube da Esquina 2, serving as a continuation for the album and the musical collective. The album maintained the collective approach, stylistic variety, and experimental aspects of its predecessor, spanning two LPs with 23 tracks. It included a wider range of national artists collaborating to the album, such as Elis Regina, Chico Buarque, and Francis Hime. The album also connects to its predecessor through song continuations or the recurrence of similar musical elements. Nascimento mentioned in an interview in 2013 that his 1994 album Angelus could be considered a "Clube da Esquina 3".

=== Accolades ===
Publication	Country	Accolade	Year	Rank
Rolling Stone Brasil	Brazil	100 Greatest Brazilian Music Records	2007	7
Eldorado FM radio	Brazil	The 30 Best Brazilian Albums	2012	2
Spin	United States	The 50 Best Albums of 1972	2022	12
Discoteca Básica	Brazil	500 Greatest Brazilian Music Records	2022	1
Paste	United States	The 300 Greatest Albums of All Time	2024	9

== Track listing ==
All songs performed by Milton Nascimento or Lô Borges.

Side one
No.	Title	Writer(s)	Lead vocals	Length
1.	"Tudo Que Você Podia Ser"	Lô Borges, Márcio Borges	Milton Nascimento	2:57
2.	"Cais"	Nascimento, Ronaldo Bastos	Nascimento	2:45
3.	"O Trem Azul"	L. Borges, Bastos	L. Borges	4:05
4.	"Saídas e Bandeiras Nº 1"	Fernando Brant, Nascimento	Beto Guedes, Nascimento	0:45
5.	"Nuvem Cigana"	L. Borges, Bastos	Nascimento	2:59
6.	"Cravo e Canela"	Nascimento, Bastos	Nascimento, L. Borges	2:31

Side two
No.	Title	Writer(s)	Lead vocals	Length
7.	"Dos Cruces"	Carmelo Larrea	Nascimento	5:22
8.	"Um Girassol Da Cor De Seu Cabelo"	L. Borges, M. Borges	L. Borges	4:12
9.	"San Vicente"	Brant, Nascimento	Nascimento	2:46
10.	"Estrelas"	L. Borges, M. Borges	L. Borges	0:28
11.	"Clube da Esquina Nº 2"	L. Borges, M. Borges, Nascimento	Nascimento	3:38

Side three
No.	Title	Writer(s)	Lead vocals	Length
12.	"Paisagem Da Janela"	Brant, L. Borges	L. Borges	2:58
13.	"Me Deixa Em Paz"	Airton Amorim, Monsueto Menezes	Nascimento, Alaíde Costa	3:05
14.	"Os Povos"	M. Borges, Nascimento	Nascimento	4:30
15.	"Saídas e Bandeiras Nº 2"	Brant, Nascimento	Guedes, Nascimento	1:30
16.	"Um Gosto De Sol"	Bastos, Nascimento	Nascimento	4:20

Side four
No.	Title	Writer(s)	Lead vocals	Length
17.	"Pelo Amor De Deus"	Brant, Nascimento	Nascimento	2:06
18.	"Lilia"	Nascimento	Nascimento	2:33
19.	"Trem De Doido"	M. Borges, L. Borges	L. Borges	3:58
20.	"Nada Será Como Antes"	Nascimento, Bastos	Guedes, Nascimento	3:23
21.	"Ao Que Vai Nascer"	Brant, Nascimento	Nascimento	3:22

== Personnel ==
The process of creating Clube da Esquina attributes the following credits:

- Milton Nascimento – lead vocals (tracks 1, 2, 4–7, 9, 11, 13–18, 20, 21), acoustic guitar (tracks 2, 4, 7, 11, 13–15, 17, 21), piano (tracks 2, 5, 16), backing vocals (tracks 10, 12, 19),
- Lô Borges – lead vocals (tracks 3, 6, 8, 10, 12, 19), acoustic guitar (tracks 1, 10), rhythm guitar (tracks 3, 19), electric guitar (tracks 9, 11), backing vocals (tracks 3, 8, 19), additional vocals (tracks 17, 20), percussion (tracks 4, 13, 15), surdo (track 6), piano (tracks 8, 12)
- Wagner Tiso – orchestral arrangements, organ (tracks 1–3, 7, 8, 11, 13, 14, 17–19, 21), piano (tracks 6, 7, 9, 13, 14, 20, 21), electric piano (track 17), backing vocals (track 10)
- Eumir Deodato – orchestral arrangements
- Beto Guedes – lead vocals (track 4, 15), bass (tracks 1, 3, 4, 8, 9, 12, 15, 21), backing vocals (tracks 3, 8, 10, 12, 19), twelve-string guitar (track 5), percussion (tracks 6, 7, 13, 18), electric guitar (tracks 7, 17, 19, 20), carillon bells (track 9)
- Rubinho – tumbadora (track 1), drums (tracks 4, 5, 7–9, 12, 15, 17–19, 21), percussion (track 13)
- Robertinho Silva – drums (track 1, 3, 6, 11, 13, 14, 20), percussion (track 2, 6, 7, 9, 17, 18, 21), backing vocals (track 10)
- Tavito – twelve-string guitar (track 1), electric guitar (tracks 6, 8, 12, 18, 20), acoustic guitar (tracks 7, 9), backing vocals (track 9), percussion (track 14),
- Toninho Horta – electric guitar (tracks 1, 3, 21), percussion (tracks 2, 4, 15, 17, 18), bass (tracks 5, 7, 19, 20), acoustic guitar (track 6), backing vocals (tracks 3, 8, 10)
- Luiz Alves – caxixi (track 1), acoustic bass (tracks 2, 5, 7), bass (tracks 6, 11, 13, 14, 17, 18, 21), percussion (tracks 6, 7, 9, 21)
- Nelson Angelo – electric guitar (tracks 4, 8, 11, 12, 15), percussion (tracks 7, 9, 18), surdo (track 13), piano (track 15)
- Paulinho Braga – percussion (track 9)
- Luiz Gonzaga Jr. – backing vocals (track 10)
- Alaide Costa – lead vocals (track 13)

=== Studio production ===
- Paulo Moura – conducting
- Jorge Teixeira, Nivaldo Duarte and Zilmar de Araújo – recording engineering
- Cafi – photography and layout
- Lindolfo Gaya – musical direction
- Juvena Pereira – photography
- Milton Miranda – production direction
- Milton Nascimento – music supervision

== Charts ==
Weekly charts for Clube da Esquina
Country — Chart (1972)	Peak position
Brazil (IBOPE)	8

== See also ==
- 1970s in Latin music
- Clube da Esquina 2

== Bibliography ==
Books

- Borges, Márcio (1996). Os sonhos não envelhecem: histórias do Clube da Esquina [The dreams never grow old: stories from the Clube da Esquina] (in Brazilian Portuguese) (5 ed.). São Paulo: Geração Editorial. ISBN 978-85-86028-44-1.
- Mello, Paulo Thiago de (21 April 2020). Milton Nascimento e Lô Borges: Clube da Esquina [Milton Nascimento and Lô Borges: Clube da Esquina]. O Livro do Disco (in Brazilian Portuguese). Editora Cobogó. ISBN 978-65-5691-002-4.
- Grasse, Jonathon (2020). Milton Nascimento and Lô Borges's The Corner Club. 33⅓ Brazil. New York City: Bloomsbury Publishing. ISBN 978-1-5013-4684-2.

Documents

- Nunes, Thais dos Guimarães Alvim (1 November 2005). A sonoridade especifica do Clube da Esquina [The specific sound of Clube da Esquina] (Master of Music thesis) (in Brazilian Portuguese). Campinas, SP: Universidade Estadual de Campinas. doi:10.47749/t/unicamp.2005.362171. hdl:20.500.12733/1601960.
