= Clube da Esquina 2 =

Studio album by Milton Nascimento
- Released: 1978
- Recorded: 1978
- Genre: Jazz pop
- Length: 79:46
- Label: Odeon

Milton Nascimento chronology
Milton (1977)	Clube da Esquina 2 (1978)	Journey to Dawn (1979)

Clube da Esquina 2 is a 1978 album by Brazilian singer-songwriter Milton Nascimento. The album serves as a continuation to the Clube da Esquina album and the related eponymous musical movement initiated in the 1960s by a group of musicians from Minas Gerais. The album retained the collective approach, stylistic diversity, and experimental elements of its predecessor, spread across two LPs with 23 tracks.

Musically, the album establishes a dialogue with previous album songs, either through the continuity of the same song or by the presentation of similar elements. It also has been analyzed by Vinícius Mendes for its thematic relevance to Brazilian history and politics, noting that the album reflects the country's social contradictions, exploring themes of hope and despair, beauty and hardship, and the tension between historical trauma and uncertain futures. The album featured a broader range of collaborators, including Brazilian artists like Elis Regina, Chico Buarque, and Francis Hime.

== Critical reception and legacy ==
Professional ratings
Review scores
Source	Rating
AllMusic	4/5 stars
Rolling Stone	3.5/5 stars
Stafford Post	9/10

The album did not achieve immediate success, unlike its predecessor Clube da Esquina. Many fans attributed this to the absence of some original members, which they believed made the new songs more "weak". Alvaro Neder, for AllMusic, gave the album a score of four out of five stars and wrote that the album "evidences details unsuspected in the original vinyl" and noted that the album "crystallizes a group of friends/composers from the Minas Gerais state" while continuing the work begun with Clube Da Esquina. Likened the recording to the Beatles' Abbey Road, he described the tracklist as "testimonies of a certain period of Brazil's history told with expressiveness and passion".

The record was described by music journalist Chris McGowan as more of "a pan-South American fusion, with less rock and not as much as North American influence". Stafford Post's Chris Evans gave the album an 9 out of 10, saying that the album is "stuffed full of sumptuous, effortless melodies lavishly orchestrated and still revelling in the avenues opened up by the Beatles". Nascimento mentioned in 2013 that his 1994 album Angelus could be considered "a Clube da Esquina 3".

== Track listing ==
Side one
No.	Title	Writer(s)	Length
1.	"Credo"	Milton Nascimento, Fernando Brant	3:02
2.	"Nascente"	Flávio Venturini, Murilo Antunes	3:20
3.	"Ruas da Cidade"	Lô Borges, Márcio Borges	3:00
4.	"Paixão e Fé"	Tavinho Moura, Brant	3:40
5.	"Casamiento de Negros"	Violeta Parra	3:50
6.	"Olho d'Água"	Paulo Jobim, Ronaldo Bastos	4:30

Side two
No.	Title	Writer(s)	Length
7.	"Canoa, Canoa"	Nelson Angelo, Brant	3:59
8.	"O Que Foi Feito Deverá / O Que Foi Feito de Vera"	Nascimento, Fernando Brant, M. Borges	5:06
9.	"Mistérios"	Joyce Moreno, Maurício Maestro	4:01
10.	"Pão e Água"	L. Borges, M. Borges, Roger Mota	2:34
11.	"E Daí? (A Queda)"	Nascimento, Ruy Guerra	5:13

Side three
No.	Title	Writer(s)	Length
12.	"Canção Amiga"	Nascimento, Carlos Drummond de Andrade	2:32
13.	"Canción por la Unidad Latinoamericana"	Pablo Milanés, Chico Buarque	3:54
14.	"Tanto"	Beto Guedes, Bastos	3:33
15.	"Dona Olímpia"	Toninho Horta, Bastos	2:38
16.	"Testamento"	Angelo, Nascimento	3:54
17.	"A Sede do Peixe (Para o que Não Tem Solução)"	Nascimento, M. Borges	2:24

Side four
No.	Title	Writer(s)	Length
18.	"Léo"	Nascimento, Buarque	4:03
19.	"Maria, Maria"	Nascimento, Brant	3:02
20.	"Meu Menino"	Danilo Caymmi, Ana Terra	2:37
21.	"Toshiro"	Novelli	3:26
22.	"Reis e Rainhas do Maracatu"	Nascimento, Novelli, Angelo, Fran	2:37
23.	"Que Bom Amigo"	Nascimento	2:51

== Bibliography ==
Books

- Mello, Paulo Thiago de (2020). Milton Nascimento e Lô Borges : Clube da Esquina. O Livro do Disco (in Brazilian Portuguese). Editora Cobogó. ISBN 978-65-5691-002-4.
- Grasse, Jonathon (2020). Milton Nascimento and Lô Borges's The Corner Club. 33 1/3 Brazil. New York, NY: Bloomsbury Academic. ISBN 978-1-5013-4684-2.

Documents

- Nunes, Thais dos Guimarães Alvim (1 November 2005). A sonoridade especifica do Clube da Esquina (Master of Music thesis) (in Brazilian Portuguese). Campinas, SP: Universidade Estadual de Campinas. doi:10.47749/t/unicamp.2005.362171. hdl:20.500.12733/1601960.
