= A Via-Láctea =

Studio album by Lô Borges
- Released: 1979
- Recorded: 1979
- Genre: MPB
- Length: 36:22
- Label: EMI

Lô Borges chronology
Lô Borges (1972)	A Via-Láctea (1979)	Os Borges (1980)

A Via-Láctea is the third studio album and second solo album by singer and composer Lô Borges, released in 1979 after a seven-year hiatus.

== Background ==
1972, with the release of Clube da Esquina and his self-titled album, was one of Borges' most productive periods but also quite distressing for the young artist, as he became isolated from friends and family under the pressure of songwriting which was enforced by the label. The success of these albums at ages 19 and 20 led Borges to return home to Minas Gerais and take a slower approach to songwriting, taking seven years to write a sufficient amount of songs to record an entire album without stress. It was Milton Nascimento who acted as a middleman between Borges and the label to get the songs released despite Borges' long disappearance from the music scene.

Many songs that were later found in compilations are originally from this album: "Clube da Esquina nº 2" – with lyrics by Márcio Borges, based on the music from Clube da Esquina, "A Via Láctea", "Equatorial", "Vento de Maio", "Tudo Que Você Podia Ser" and "Nau Sem Rumo". The album also features Borges' sister, Solange Borges, and works from composers like Fernando Oly, Rodrigo Leste, Paulinho Carvalho, and Telo Borges, his brother.

Nana Caymmi was an influence on the lyrics of the album.

== Interpretations ==
"Vento de Maio" was covered by Elis Regina on the 1980 album Elis. It was again covered in 2013 by Seu Jorge and Maria Rita, Regina's daughter.

== Track listing ==
Side one

1. "Sempre-viva" (Márcio Borges and Lô Borges) – 3:34
2. "Ela" (Márcio Borges and Lô Borges) – 3:27
3. "A Via-Láctea" (Lô Borges and Ronaldo Bastos) – 3:00
4. "Clube da Esquina nº 2" (Márcio Borges, Lô Borges, and Milton Nascimento) – 3:57
5. "A olho nu" (Márcio Borges and Lô Borges) – 3:07

Side two

1. "Equatorial" (Márcio Borges, Beto Guedes, and Lô Borges) – 3:12
2. "Vento de maio" (Telo Borges and Márcio Borges) – 4:24
3. "Chuva na montanha" (Fernando Oly) – 2:45
4. "Tudo que você podia ser" (Márcio Borges and Lô Borges) – 3:45
5. "Olha o bicho livre" (Rodrigo Leste and Paulinho Carvalho) – 2:39
6. "Nau sem rumo" (Márcio Borges and Lô Borges) – 2:32

== Personnel ==
- Lô Borges – vocals, acoustic guitar, electric guitar, piano
- Solange Borges – vocals
- Telo Borges – acoustic guitar, piano, backing vocals
- Hely Rodrigues – drums
- Fernando Oly – acoustic guitar, backing vocals
- Paulinho Carvalho – bass, electric guitar, acoustic guitar, backing vocals
- Luiz Alves – bass
- Cláudio Venturini – electric guitar
- Wagner Tiso – synthesizer, piano, accordion
- Robertinho Silva – percussion, drums
- Toninho Horta – percussion, electric guitar
- Aleuda – percussion
- Celso Woltzenlogel – flute
- Copinha – flute
- Jorge Ferreira da Silva – flute
- Jaime – flute
- Vermelho – synthesizer, organ
- Flávio Venturini – synthesizer, piano, backing vocals
- Telo Borges – electric piano
