= Milton (1970 album) =

Studio album by Milton Nascimento
- Released: 1970
- Recorded: 1969–1970
- Genre: MPB; jazz; psychedelic rock; progressive rock
- Length: 29:32
- Language: Portuguese
- Label: EMI-Odeon
- Producer: Milton Miranda; Lyrio Panicali; Milton Nascimento

Milton Nascimento chronology
| Milton Nascimento (1969) | Milton (1970) | Clube da Esquina (1972) |

Professional ratings
Review scores
| Source | Rating |
|---|---|
| AllMusic | 4/5 stars |

Milton is the fourth studio album by Brazilian musician Milton Nascimento, released in 1970. The album features the progressive rock band Som Imaginário which was composed of Wagner Tiso, Zé Rodrix, Tavito Frederyko, Luiz Alves and Robertinho Silva.

Milton is considered to be one of the most significant albums in the Minas Gerais music scene of the 1970s. The album's use of diverse musical styles, dense instrumentation, and innovative studio work laid the foundation for his subsequent album, Clube da Esquina.

== Recording ==
Milton Nascimento's involvement with cinema includes composing the theme for a documentary about the soccer player Tostão and both acting in and producing the soundtrack for Os Deuses e os Mortos by Mozambican director Ruy Guerra. The album incorporated elements from the film, such as the songs "Maria Três Filhos" and "Canto Latino". In 1994, the album was remastered and re-released with new bonus tracks: "Tema de Tostão", "Aqui é o País do Futebol", "O Homem da Sucursal", and "Jogo." Milton also re-recorded "Pai Grande" and "A Felicidade" (a standard by Tom Jobim and Vinícius de Moraes).

The opening track of the album, "Para Lennon e McCartney", was composed by Lô Borges, Fernando Brant, and Márcio Borges, it was conceived during a Sunday pasta party, where Lô created the piano base and Fernando Brant and Márcio Borges wrote the lyrics. The inspiration for the lyrics came from Lô's reflection on the partnership between Lennon and McCartney following the Beatles' announcement of their breakup.

The album cover, designed by Kélio Rodrigues, depicts Milton as a king. The recording sessions included musicians from the band Som Imaginário. Additional contributions came from Wagner Tiso, with guest appearances by Lô Borges on the tracks "Clube da Esquina" and "Alunar", Naná Vasconcelos on percussion and drums, and Dori Caymmi conducting "Alunar".

== Track listing ==
Milton – Original release
| No. | Title | Writer(s) | Length |
|---|---|---|---|
| 1. | "Para Lennon e McCartney" | Lô Borges, Márcio Borges, Fernando Brant | 2:17 |
| 2. | "Amigo, Amiga" | Milton Nascimento, Ronaldo Bastos | 4:31 |
| 3. | "Maria Três Filhos" | Milton Nascimento, Fernando Brant | 1:36 |
| 4. | "Clube da Esquina" | Milton Nascimento, Lô Borges, Márcio Borges | 2:48 |
| 5. | "Canto Latino" | Milton Nascimento, Ruy Guerra | 4:31 |
| 6. | "Durango Kid" | Toninho Horta, Fernando Brant | 2:41 |
| 7. | "Pai Grande" | Milton Nascimento | 5:03 |
| 8. | "Alunar" | Lô Borges, Márcio Borges | 3:21 |
| 9. | "A Felicidade" | Antonio Carlos Jobim, Vinícius de Moraes | 2:44 |
| Total length: | | | 29:32 |

Milton – 1994 remaster
| No. | Title | Writer(s) | Length |
|---|---|---|---|
| 10. | "Tema De Tostao" | | 2:53 |
| 11. | "O Homen Da Sucursal" | | 2:30 |
| 12. | "Aqui E O Pais D Futebol" | Milton Nascimento | 2:49 |
| 13. | "O Jogo" | Pacífico Mascarenhas | 2:18 |
| Total length: | | | 39:52 |
