= Milton (1977 album) =

Studio album by Milton Nascimento
- Released: January 1977
- Recorded: 1976
- Studios: Shangri-La Studios, Malibu and The Village Recorder, Los Angeles
- Genre: MPB
- Length: 43:16
- Label: A&M SP-4611
- Producer: Rob Fraboni

Milton Nascimento chronology
Geraes (1976)	Milton (1977)	Clube da Esquina 2 (1982)

Milton is a 1977 album by Milton Nascimento.

== Reception ==
Professional ratings
Review scores
Source	Rating
AllMusic	4.5/5 stars

The album was reviewed by Terri Hinte for Allmusic who wrote that the album was "a remarkably cohesive piece of work that stands as one of his finest".

== Track listing ==
1. "Raça (Hasa) (Race)" (Fernando Brant, Milton Nascimento) – 3:35
2. "Fairy Tale Song (Cadê)" (Matthew Moore, Nascimento, Ruy Guerra) – 4:11
3. "Francisco" (Nascimento) – 4:27
4. "Nothing Will Be As It Was (Nada Será Como Antes)" (Nascimento, Rene Vincent, Ronaldo Bastos) – 3:53
5. "Cravo E Canela (Clove and Cinnamon)" (Nascimento, Bastos) – 3:44
6. "The Call (Chamada)" (Nascimento, Bastos) – 5:49
7. "One Coin (Tostão)" (Matthew Moore Nascimento) – 5:30
8. "Saídas E Bandeiras (Exits and Flags)" (Brant, Nascimento) – 4:45
9. "Os Povos (The People)" (Borges, Nascimento) – 8:06

== Personnel ==
- Milton Nascimento – guitar, vocals, arranger
- Toninho Horta – electric guitar
- Wayne Shorter – soprano saxophone, tenor saxophone
- Raul De Souza – trombone
- Herbie Hancock – piano
- Hugo Fattoruso – piano, electric organ
- Novelli – double bass
- Roberto Silva – drums, percussion
- Laudir De Oliveira – percussion

Production

- Bernie Grundman – mastering
- Jeremy Zatkin – engineer
- Roland Young – art direction
- Phil Shima – design
- Rob Fraboni – producer
- CAFI – photography
