= Juarez Moreira =

Brazilian guitarist and composer (born 1954)

Juarez Moreira (born 1954 in Guanhães, Brazil) is a Brazilian guitarist and composer.

== Music career ==
A native of Guanhães, Brazil, Moreira went to school in Belo Horizonte. In 1978 his music career began with Wagner Tiso. He released several albums in Brazil. His first album to be released in America was Bom Dia with vocalist Ithamara Koorax in 1998. Moreira has also worked with Brazilian musicians Toninho Horta and Milton Nascimento.

== Discography ==
- Bom Dia (1989)
- Nuvens Douradas (1995)
- Aquarelas with Nivaldo Ornelas (1996)
- Instrumental no CCBB with Badi Assad (1997)
- Samblues (1997)
- Good Morning (Malandro, 1998)
- Quadros Modernos with Toninho Horta and Chiquito Braga (2000)
- Solo (2003)
- Juá (2007)
- Bim Bom with Ithamara Koorax (Motéma, 2009)
- Riva (2010)
- Juarez Moreira: Ao Vivo no Palácio das Artes (2011)
- Castelo with Peter Scharli and Hans Feigenwinter (TBC, 2013)
- Cuerdas Del Sur (2018)
- Cine Pathé (2018)
- Andorinha (2025)
