= Lô Borges (album) =

Studio album by Lô Borges
- Released: September 1972
- Genre: MPB, Singer/Songwriter, Psychedelic rock
- Length: 30:23
- Label: Odeon
- Producer: Milton Miranda

Lô Borges chronology
Clube da Esquina (1972)	Lô Borges (1972)	A Via-Láctea (1979)

Lô Borges is the debut solo album by Brazilian songwriter Lô Borges.

== Background ==
While recording Clube da Esquina alongside Milton Nascimento and Beto Guedes, Lô Borges was pressured by Odeon Records to release a solo album. Borges, only nineteen years old at the time, wrote the album very quickly, sometimes writing a song in the morning and recording it that night. The album did not achieve much success at its release, although it gained cult status in the following decades. After the release of this album, Borges would not release another album until 1979's A Via Lactea.

Alex Turner, lead singer of the band Arctic Monkeys, said that the song "Aos barões" of the album by Lô Borges served as inspiration for the production of the album Tranquility Base Hotel & Casino.

=== Cover ===
The album cover is a picture of a pair of second-hand Adidas that Borges had been given by his cousin, hence the album's nickname "Disco do Tênis" (Sneaker Album). Photographer Cafi, who took the picture in front of his house, took the material to the label, which disliked it, having shown a similar reaction to the Clube da Esquina cover due to its depiction of two anonymous children. According to Borges, the sneakers symbolize his intention to hit the road after the album's release.

== Track listing ==
All tracks written by Lô Borges unless otherwise noted.

No.	Title	Writer(s)	Length
1.	"Você Fica Melhor Assim"	L. Borges, Tavinho Moura	2:08
2.	"Canção Postal"	L. Borges, Ronaldo Bastos	2:11
3.	"O Caçador"	L. Borges, Márcio Borges	1:59
4.	"Homem da Rua"		2:00
5.	"Não Foi Nada"		1:47
6.	"Pensa Você"		1:27
7.	"Fio da Navalha"		2:20
8.	"Pra Onde Vai Você"	L. Borges, M. Borges	0:38
9.	"Calibre"		1:29
10.	"Faça Seu Jogo"	L. Borges, M. Borges	1:43
11.	"Não Se Apague Esta Noite"	L. Borges, M. Borges	2:32
12.	"Aos Barões"		2:32
13.	"Como o Machado"		1:45
14.	"Eu Sou Como Você É"		3:04
15.	"Toda Essa Água"		2:48
