= Monsueto =

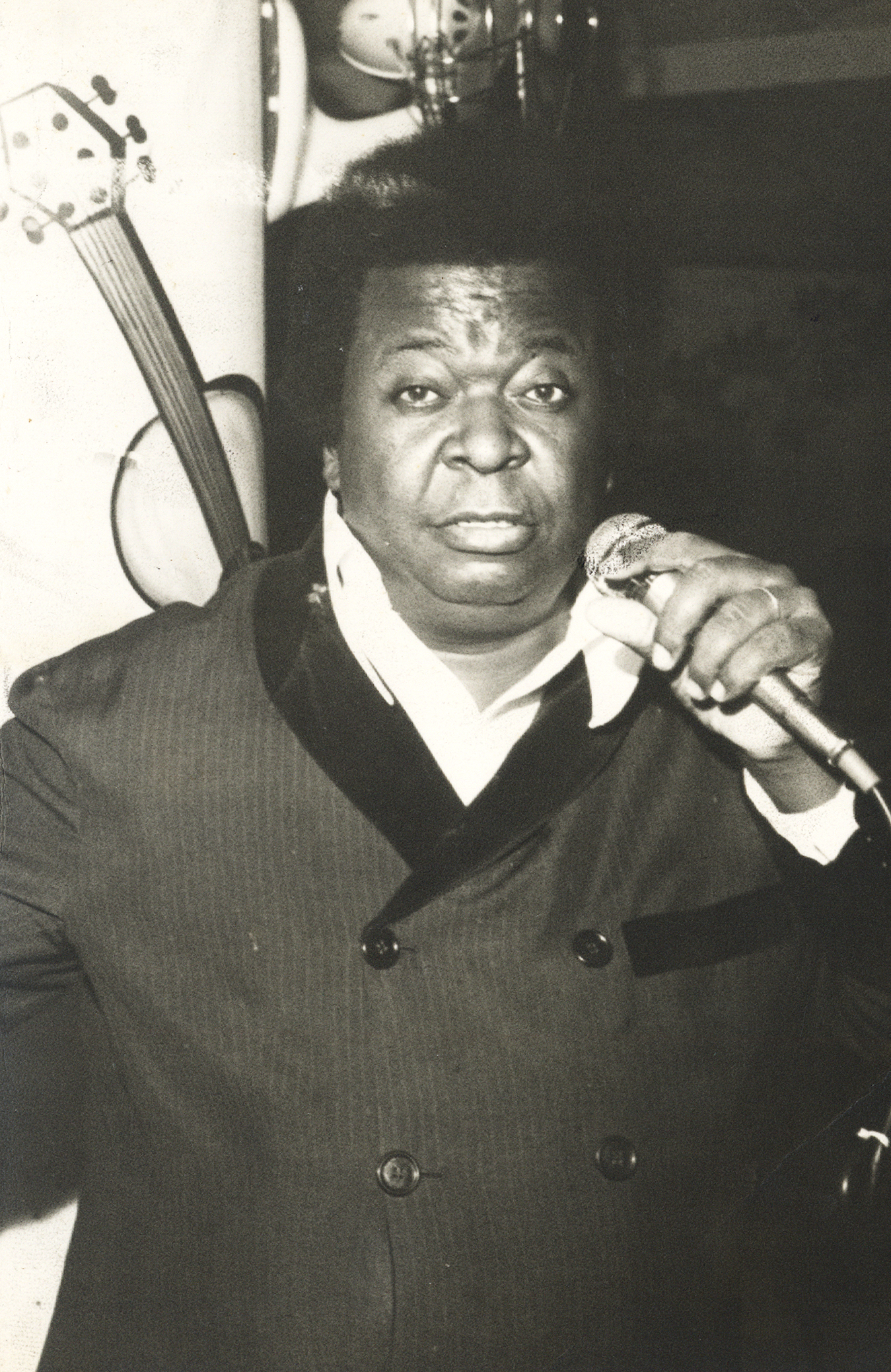
- Monsueto in 1971

Background information
- Also known as: Monsueto
- Born: Monsueto Campos de Menezes; November 4, 1924; Morro do Pinto favela, Rio de Janeiro, Brazil
- Origin: Rio de Janeiro
- Died: March 17, 1973 (aged 48) Rio de Janeiro
- Genres: Samba
- Occupations: Musician, singer, composer, painter, actor
- Instruments: Voice, drums

Monsueto Campos de Menezes (November 4, 1924 – March 17, 1973), better known as Monsueto, was a Brazilian sambista, singer, composer, drummer, painter, and actor. He was a part of the samba de morro (Portuguese for "hill samba") school, and helped popularize it along with other artists such as Cartola, Nelson Cavaquinho, Clementina de Jesus, Silas de Oliveira, Mano Décio da Viola, and Zé Keti. His musical output, though small, is considered very valuable to the history of Brazilian music.

== Career ==
A Monsueto painting from 1969

Born in Gávea but raised in the favela Morro do Pinto, Monsueto was an orphan by the age of three and was brought up by his grandmother and aunt. He began playing drums around the age of 15, and during the 1940s he played in various bands, including the Orquestra de Copinha, which performed at the Copacabana Palace Hotel. During the early 1950s many of his compositions were recorded by other artists, and by the late 1950s he was appearing in films and on television, and making his own recordings. In later years, he found success as a painter.

== Influence ==
After waning in popularity, Monsueto was "rediscovered" in the late 1960s, beginning with Maria Bethânia's cover of his song "Mora na filosofia". Two legendary albums recorded in the 1970s (Milton Nascimento et al.'s Clube da Esquina and Caetano Veloso's Transa, voted to number 7 and number 10, respectively, on Rolling Stone Brazil's list of greatest Brazilian albums of all time) featured Monsueto's compositions. Caetano performed a rock and roll-inspired version of the song his sister had previously covered, "Mora no filosofia", on Transa, while Milton performed "Me deixa em paz" with Alaíde Costa on Clube da Esquina. Caetano also performed Monsueto's song "Eu quero essa mulher" on Araçá azul, the followup to Transa.

== Filmography ==
- O Forte (1974)
- A Hora e a Vez do Samba (1971)
- Salário Mínimo (1970)
- Of Gods and the Undead (1970)
- Quatro Homens Juntos (1965)
- La leona (1964)
- Golden Goddess of Rio Beni (uncredited) (1964)
- Briga, Mulher e Samba (1960)
- Favela (1960)
- Na Corda Bamba (1958)
- Treze Cadeiras (1957)

== Discography ==
=== 78 singles ===
The cover for Monsueto's 1962 LP record

- O sucesso está na cara/Larga o meu pé (Monsueto, 1964)
- Chica da Silva/Mané João (Odeon, 1963)
- Sambamba/Retrato de Cabral (Orion, 1963)
- Ajudai o próximo/Eu quero essa mulher assim mesmo (Odeon, 1961)
- Prova real/Bola branca (Copacabana, 1957)
- Nega Pompéia/Q. G. do samba (Mocambo, 1955)

=== LPs ===
- Mora na Filosofia dos Sambas de Monsueto (Odeon, 1962)
