= Alaíde Costa =

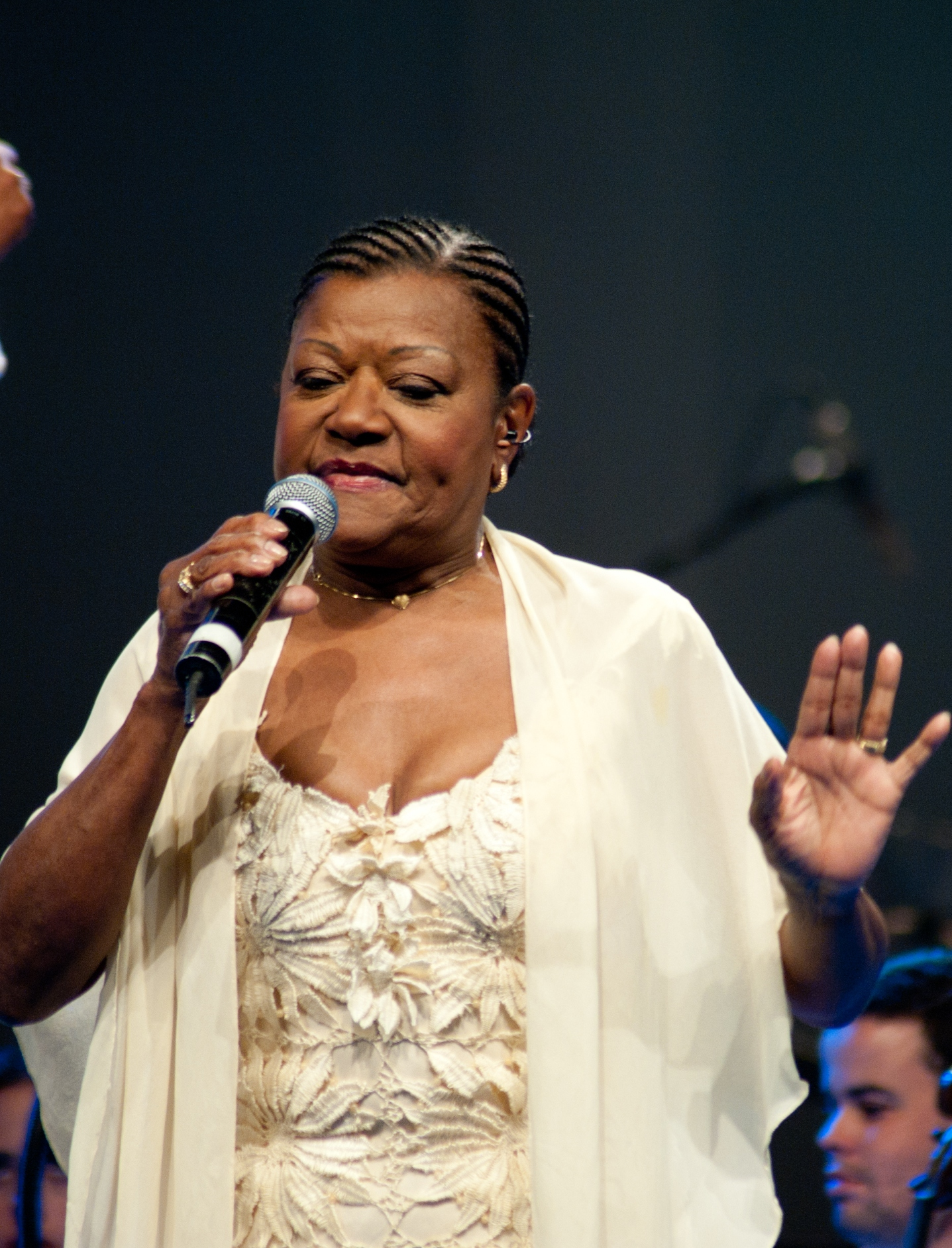
- Costa in 2010

Background information
- Born: Alaíde Costa Silveira Mondin Gomide; December 8, 1935 (age 90); Rio de Janeiro, Brazil
- Genres: Bossa nova
- Instrument: vocal
- Years active: 1957–present

Alaíde Costa Silveira Mondin Gomide (born 8 December 1935), known as Alaíde Costa, is a Brazilian singer-songwriter.

== Life ==
=== Early years ===
Alaíde Costa was born in Rio de Janeiro, in the neighborhood of Méier. Her brother enrolled her in a local children's singing competition, and as a 13-year-old she was hosted by Rádio Tupi in the program Sequência G3 winning a singing competition, and the following year in Rádio Nacional's Arraia miúda, both broadcasts for young talents. Later, she appeared in Pescando estrelas, a radio show hosted by Ary Barroso for Rádio Clube do Brasil.

=== Artistic career ===
She debuted as a professional singer in 1957 at the Avenida club, in Rio de Janeiro, the same venue where two other musical stars, Elizeth Cardoso and Ângela Maria began their careers. Two years later she was in the recording studio for two 78 rpm records. The first featured the songs Conselhos and Domingo de amor, the second, entitled Tarde demais, was awarded revelation of the year. Despite having a bolero musical background, in 1959 Alaíde Costa was won over to bossa nova by João Gilberto and recorded her first album titled Gosto de você, in which the singer took up compositions by some of the major authors of the new genre: among them Dolores Duran, João Donato, Carlos Lyra, Ronaldo Bôscoli, Oldemar Magalhães, Paulo Tito, Tom Jobim, Vinícius de Moraes, as well as Gilberto himself. That year Alaíde Costa participated in a performance held at the Faculty of Architecture in Rio along with many young musician names and captivated the audience with her rendition of Chora tua tristeza, composed by Oscar Castro-Neves and Fiorini, becoming the most acclaimed artist along with Sylvia Telles. Two months later she was on stage in another bossa nova composers' performance organized by Bôscoli, and in December with other artists in the Rádio Globo concert hall. At the end of the year, Costa reunited with another bossa nova musicians in a gathering brought together by the magazine O Cruzeiro; among them were Gilberto, Luiz Bonfá, Bôscoli, Lyra, Roberto Menescal, Telles, Nara Leão, Oscar and Iko Castro-Neves, Luiz Eça, Chico Feitosa, Nana Caymmi and others, along with Ary Barroso who, as a representative of the older musical generation, conceptually passed the baton with his presence.

She released another LP of bossa nova hits in 1960 under the title Alaíde canta suavemente; many of the previously mentioned composers were joined by Oscar Castro-Neves, Maria Cecília, Aloysio de Oliveira, Luiz Bandeira, Roberto Menescal and Newton Mendonça; that year the singer participated in bossa nova concerts in Rio de Janeiro. The following year, she released the LP Alaíde jóia moderna; in this work, in addition to using compositions by other artists such as Baden Powell and Billy Blanco, she starred as a songwriter with the song Canção de amor sem fim, written in collaboration with Geraldo Vandré. In 1962 the singer got married and moved from Rio de Janeiro to São Paulo. – where, hired by Odeon, Costa had been kept away from the recording studio, a conduct that the singer accused as a form of racism by the record company.

The LP Afinal..., released in 1963, took its title from the title track composed by Alaíde Costa, who in this work also recorded songs by other composers including Paulinho Nogueira. The following year was one of successful live performances. At the Teatro Paramount in São Paulo she was one among many leading figures in the show O fino da bossa, with a rich lineup of musicians, some from Rio de Janeiro - Nara Leão, Jorge Ben, Wanda Sá, Rosinha de Valença, Os Cariocas, Marcos Valle - and other Paulistas born or raised, such as Walter Wanderley, Paulinho Nogueira, Claudette Soares and the Zimbo Trio; and on that occasion Alaíde Costa achieved great public and critical success with the song Onde está você. At the Teatro Santa Rosa in Rio she was on stage together with Castro-Neves, back in São Paulo she took part in the 1st University Festival of the TV Tupi station, and performed at the Teatro Municipal in Alaíde alaúde, a recital of Renaissance music. 1965 saw the release of the LP Alaíde Costa, which included compositions by Valle, Castro-Neves and Chico Buarque and featured Tudo o que é meu, written by the singer in collaboration with Vinícius de Moraes.

Due to health problems, the singer retired from the stage until 1972, when she participated in the LP Clube da Esquina with the inclusion, in the company of Milton Nascimento, of the song Me deixa em paz. From the same year is the maxi single that includes Diz, Enlouqueci, Ansiedade and E a gente sonhando. Another LP, produced by Aloysio de Oliveira, was released the following year, Alaíde Costa e Oscar Castro Neves, containing a composition by the singer, Amigo amado, co-written with Vinícius, and other songs by Carlos Lyra, Vinícius de Moraes, and Oscar Castro-Neves. 1974 saw her in the recording studio for an LP, Alaíde Costa, and a maxi single with four tracks. She participated alongside Johnny Alf and Lúcio Alves in the Bossa Nova installment of the MPB-100 radio series, from which eight albums were made. She also released the single Onde está você, re-recorded by the singer. The following year the album Coração was released, with a song of her own composition, and in 1982 she included compositions by Hermínio Bello de Carvalho reproduced on the LP Águas vivas: Alaíde Costa canta Hermínio Bello de Carvalho. In 1988 she recorded Amiga de verdade, featuring, in addition to Costa, Paulinho da Viola, Egberto Gismonti and Milton Nascimento. Three years later, in São Paulo, she performed with Nogueira in the show Coração violão and in another show titled Alaíde canta Tom Jobim. São Paulo's Municipal Theater welcomes her back in a show in which she sang Jobim's songs, to great success.

In 2000 she released the CD Falando de amor and performed as a featured artist in Rio de Janeiro's Mistura Fina and Vinicius Piano Bar venues. Three years later she performed with Johnny Alf at Queen Elizabeth Hall participating in the London Jazz Festival, and in 2005 she released the CD Tudo que o tempo me deixou, where Costa was backed by a quintet. That same year, in Paris, she participated in the Brasil Brasileiro festival with Elza Soares and Jair Rodrigues. In 2011 the box set 100 anos de Música Popular Brasileira was released, four CDs that include songs by many Brazilian artists and in which Alaíde Costa sings Desafinado and Eu não existo sem você, by Jobim and Mendonça, Garota de Ipanema by Jobim and Vinícius, and Lobo bobo by Carlos Lyra and Ronaldo Bôscoli. Three years later she published Canção de Alaíde, containing bossa nova classics composed by the singer together with other musicians. From the same year came Ricardo Santhiago's book Alaíde Costa: faria tudo de novo, a biography tracing the singer's artistic career. To celebrate the artist's 80th birthday, a show tracing her work was presented. In the same year, also as part of the celebrations, Alaíde Costa released the album Alegria é guardada em cofres, catedrais, together with guitarist Toninho Horta. In 2022 she released the CD O que meus calos dizem sobre mim. In 2023 she presented at Carnegie Hall, in the show “Bossa Nova: The Greatest Night, 60 years after the 1962 first international bossa nova concert in the same venue, in which she did not perform.

Her album Harmonias Que Soam e Ressoam was chosen by the Associação Paulista de Críticos de Arte as one of the 50 best Brazilian albums of 2023. E o Tempo Agora Quer Voar was also chosen for the 2024 list.

== Discography ==
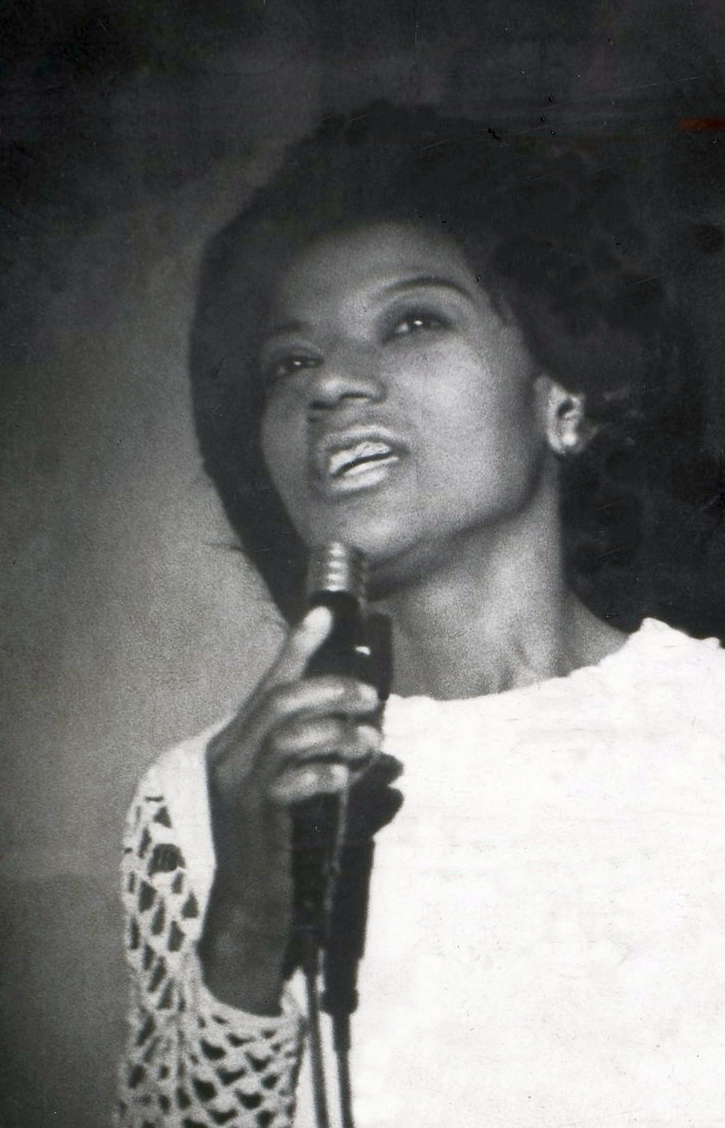
Alaíde Costa in 1965

=== LP ===
- 1959 – Gosto de você • RCA Victor • LP
- 1960 – Alaíde canta suavemente • RCA Victor
- 1961 – Alaíde, jóia moderna • RCA Victor • LP
- 1963 – Afinal... • Audio Fidelity
- 1965 – Alaíde Costa • Som Maior
- 1972 – Clube da Esquina • EMI-Odeon
- 1973 – Alaide Costa & Oscar Castro Neves • Odeon
- 1975 – Alaíde Costa • Coronado/Odeon
- 1976 – Coração • EMI/Odeon • LP
- 1982 – Águas vivas • Vento de Raio
- 1988 – Amiga de verdade • Independente

=== CD ===
- 1993 – No Tom da Mangueira • Saci • CD
- 1995 – Alaíde Costa & João Carlos Assis Brasil • Movieplay • CD
- 1996 – Songbook Tom Jobim • Lumiar Discos • CD
- 1997 – Pouco pra mim • Dabliú Discos • CD
- 1998 – Milton Nascimento-Sua vida, sua música • Reader's Digest • CD
- 2000 – Falando de amor • CID • CD
- 2005 – Tudo que o tempo me deixou • CD
- 2011 – 100 Anos de Música Popular Brasileira (various artists) – participation – Instituto Cultural Cravo Albin/Discobertas – Box with 4 CDs
- 2014 – Canções de Alaíde • Selo Nova estação • CD
- 2015 – Alegria é Guardada em Cofres, Catedrais - Com Toninho Horta • Independent • CD
- 2022 - O que meus calos dizem sobre mim

=== Singles ===
- 1957 – "Conselhos"/"Domingo de amor" • 78
- 1957 – "Tarde demais" • 78
- 1972 – "Diz"/"Ansiedade"/"Enlouqueci"/"E a gente sonhando" • Maxi single
- 1972 – "Diariamente"/"Antes e depois" • single
- 1973 – Alaíde Costa • Odeon • single
- 1974 – "Calvário"/"Avenida fechada"/"Primavera"/"O rei da França na ilha da assombração" • Maxi single
- 1975 – Alaíde Costa • Odeon • single
- 1975 – "Onde está você" • single

== Bibliography ==
- Castro, Ruy (2005). Chega de Saudade. Storia e storie della bossa nova (in Italian). Italy: Angelica. ISBN 978-88-7896-001-5.
