= Robertinho Silva =

Brazilian drummer (born 1941)

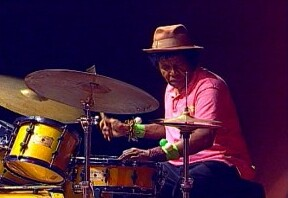
Robertinho Silva

Robertinho Silva (born 1941) is a Brazilian drummer known for jazz. His first album was Música Popular Brasileira in 1981.

He began his career with the band Som Imaginário with Zé Rodrix, Wagner Tiso and Luiz Alves.

The beginning of his career, in the late 1960s, occurred when he joined the group "Som Imaginário," which also included Wagner Tiso, Luiz Alves, Zé Rodrix, and Tavito. Since then, he has participated in recordings and concerts with major names in Brazilian and international music. He has appeared in several important music festivals, including New Port, Berlin, the Free Jazz Festival, JVC New York, Montreaux, and Midem, among others.

He has played with many famous musicians including João Donato, Marcos Valle, Milton Nascimento (with whom he has worked for 26 years), Aleuda Silva, Pablo Silva, Gilberto Gil, Taiguara, Toninho Horta, Roberto Carlos, Gal Costa, João Bosco, Paulo Moura, Airto Moreira, Moacyr Santos, Ron Carter, Wayne Shorter, Shelly Manne, Peggy Lee, Cal Tjader, Sarah Vaughan, George Duke, Flora Purim, Egberto Gismonti, George Benson.

== Discography ==
- Robertinho Silva (Philips, 1981)
- Bateria (Carmo, 1983)
- Triângulo (Carmo, 1985)
- Bodas de Prata (CBS, 1989)
- Shot on Goal (Milestone, 1995)
- Brazilian Mixture (Prestige, 2009)
- Duo + Dois (Selo, 2019)

== See also ==
- Mário Negrão
