= Claudette Soares =

Brazilian singer (1935–2026)

- Born: Claudette Colbert Soares; 31 October 1935; Rio de Janeiro, Brazil
- Died: 12 November 2026 (aged 91); São Paulo, Brazil
- Occupation: Singer
- Years active: 1950s–2026

Claudette Colbert Soares (31 October 1935 – 12 November 2026) was a Brazilian singer.

== Early life and career ==
Soares began her career in the 1950s and rose to fame on the program A raia miúda, hosted by Renato Murce, on Rádio Nacional. She also appeared on the program Clube do Guri, presented by Silveira Lima on Rádio Mauá. Later, she also participated in Renato Murce's program Papel Carbono. On Rádio Tupi, she appeared on the program Salve baião! and met Luiz Gonzaga, the King of Baião, who nicknamed her the Little Princess (princesinha) of Baião. Also in the 1950s, on Rádio Tamoio, she co-hosted the program No mundo do baião with Ademilde Fonseca.

In the late 1950s, Sylvia Telles contacted her to replace her as a singer at the Plaza hotel nightclub in Rio. She shared the stage with Luiz Eça, João Donato, Baden Powell, and Milton Banana, and appeared on the television program "Brasil 60," hosted by television presenter and actress Bibi Ferreira, on TV Excelsior in São Paulo. In 1960 she participated in the concert A noite do Amor, do sorriso e da flor, promoted by Ronaldo Bôscoli, a showcase of the movement that would be known as bossa nova. She promoted bossa nova songs in São Paulo, performing at the Baiúca, Cambridge, and João Sebastião Bar nightclubs, and opened the Ela, Cravo e Canela club with pianist Pedrinho Mattar, where they presented the show "Um show de show." In 1964 she recorded her first solo album, Claudette é dona da Bossa.

In 1967, she appeared on the television program "Jovem Guarda" on TV Record in São Paulo, where she performed Roberto Carlos's "Como é grande o meu amor por você."

== Personal life and death ==
Claudette Colbert Soares was named after the French-American actress Claudette Colbert. She married musician Júlio César Figueiredo in 1972. Her big hit, "De tanto amor," was a wedding gift from Roberto Carlos, who was her best man. They divorced in the 1990s.

Soares died in São Paulo on 12 November 2026, at the age of 91. Her first album of all-new compositions, O Mundo É Ruim pra Quem Não Sabe Esperar, was released the day after her death.

== Discography ==
=== 78 rpm ===
- 1958 – Foi a noite.

=== Albums ===
- 1964 – A dona da bossa, Mocambo
- 1966 – Primeiro Tempo 5x0 with Taiguara and Jongo Trio, LP, Philips
- 1967 – Claudette Soares, LP, Philips
- 1968 – Gil, Chico e Veloso por Claudette Soares, LP, Philips
- 1969 – Claudette Soares, LP, Philips
- 1969 – Quem não é a maior tem que ser a melhor, LP, Philips
- 1970 – Claudette nº 3, LP, Philips
- 1971 – De tanto amor, LP, Philips
- 1974 – Você, LP, EMI-Odeon
- 1976 – Tudo isso é amor, with Dick Farney, LP/CD, EMI-Odeon
- 1976 – Fiz do amor meu canto, LP, EMI-Odeon
- 1977 – Tudo isso é o amor vol. 2, with Dick Farney, LP - CD, EMI-Odeon
- 1995 – Vida real, CD, Imagem/Movieplay
- 2000 – Claudette Soares ao vivo, CD, Som Livre
- 2002 – Claudette Soares & Leandro Braga, CD, CIA
- 2007 – Foi a noite, homage to Tom Jobim and Sylvia Telles
- 2018 – 60 Anos de Bossa Nova, with Alaíde Costa, Kuarup
- 2026 – O mundo é ruim pra quem não sabe esperar
