= Jonathon Grasse =

American composer and musician

Jonathon Grasse is an American composer, ethnomusicologist, and improvising electric guitarist. He is a professor of music at California State University, Dominguez Hills.

== Career ==
=== Composition ===
Grasse’s list of music compositions dating to the late-1980s includes over thirty pieces for soloists, chamber groups, large ensembles, and American gamelan. His Triptych for String Trio was awarded first place in the 2012 American Composers Forum-Los Angeles competition. "The Informal Sector," a concerto for two trombones and Just Intonation gamelan (2010) premiered at a Microfest concert at Claremont's Harvey Mudd College. Both of these works appear on his 2016 CD Six Compositions. Many of his works for guitar and guitar ensemble have been concertized by Los Angeles–based guitarist Peter Yates. Since 2017, Grasse has collaborated with the new music ensemble Brightwork, resulting in several works for that sextet.

In addition to fully notated compositions, Grasse has collaborated with Los Angeles–based ensembles on structured improvisations and site-specific pieces as a composer and electric guitarist since the late 1990s. Grasse's four-hour-long piece "13 + 7 + one" (2006) for multiple ensembles was commissioned for the environs of the Frank Gehry-designed Edgemar complex in Santa Monica, California, where it was performed in 2006. The same year, his site-specific work "Curfew" for octet, covering four city blocks of the Long Beach Arts District, was performed for that city's Soundwalk festival. In 2003, the Los Angeles Times' critic Victoria Looseleaf reviewed his Skirball Cultural Center Siteworks electronic music collaboration with choreographer Parijat Desai: "Making felicitous use of the Mark Taper Courtyard in the site-specific series, choreographer Parijat Desai, in collaboration with Liam Clancy, Iddrisu Saaka and Denise Uyehara, performed “Water, Tree, Stone,” an elegiac take on the notion of peace. Set to Jonathon Grasse’s sound collage that veered from techno to Portuguese love songs and talk of cruise missiles, the quartet traversed the patio with butoh-like deliberateness before brandishing a large papier-mache globe among them."

In 2017, Grasse began composing for the Los Angeles-based New Music ensemble Brightwork directed by pianist Aron Kallay, those works including "Radio Free Los Angeles (Two Movements for Mixed Sextet)," (2017) "Cooking School," (2018) and "The Garden Song" (2023). In 2024 at a Piano Spheres concert at 2220 Arts + Archives, Kallay premiered Grasse's piece for microtonal solo keyboard "Reeded Cottage, 1905 (Knipton, Leicestershire)."

=== Guitarist ===
As an electric guitarist, Grasse began experimenting with spontaneous improvisation with writer and pianist Carter Scholz, whom he met in 1986 as a member of the Mills College gamelan. Some of their Berkeley session recordings appear as part of Scholz' Frog Peak catalog. After relocating to Los Angeles, Grasse played guitar with Surrealestate and Decisive Instant, Los Angeles–based improvisation collectives. Between 1999 and 2012, he appeared on five full-length recordings of improvised ensemble music released through Acoustic Levitation Records, including his own Phantomwise (2012), and others featuring the Los Angeles–based collective Surrealestate, Gustavo Aguilar, and Robert Reigle. In this capacity he has appeared with various groups at the Hammer Museum, REDCAT Theater, the Electric Lodge in Venice, Eagle Rock Performing Arts Center's Open Gate Theater, Cultural Center of Long Beach, San Francisco's Luggage Store Gallery, and the 1999, and 2004 Big Sur Experimental Music Festival. Since 2017, Grasse has convened for performances various formations of his improvisation ensemble the Native Plant Society.

=== Academic ===
An M.A. in composition (UC Santa Cruz, 1995). In 1999, he earned a Ph.D. in composition with the cognate in ethnomusicology from UCLA. Grasse furthered his gamelan studies and performance in UCLA's Central Javanese gamelan directed by master Balinese musician and dancer Pak Nyoman Wenten. Remaining at UCLA as an instructor from 1999-2005, Grasse taught world music theory, music of Brazil, composition, and western music theory, and sponsored a student capoeira group. Along with ethnomusicologists Brenda Romero and Paul Humphries, Grasse was a principle presenter for the College Music Society-affiliated Institute for the Pedagogy of World Music Theories held at the University of Colorado, Boulder (2005, 2007, 2010), an institute that grew from their presentations at meetings of the Society for Ethnomusicology. Since 2005, he has been a professor of music at California State University, Dominguez Hills, where he directs the CSUDH Festival of New and Improvised Music.

== Research work ==
Grasse's most recent book is his 2024 Jazz Revolutionary: The Life and Music of Eric Dolphy (Jawbone Press), voted Best Jazz Biography by the Jazz Journalist Association. Grasse's previous ethnomusicology research and publications focused on music from Minas Gerais, Brazil, and includes articles examining regional Afro-Brazilian music traditions. He is the author of Hearing Brazil: Music in Minas Gerais, published in 2022 by University Press of Mississippi. A reviewer noted of that,

A review in [publication] noted the book's emphasis on the Afro-Mineiro dimension of regional identity and its wide range of sources, and suggested it would be useful to scholars across several disciplines as well as to those teaching Brazilian history and music.

Since the early 1990s, Grasse has pursued fieldwork investigations and archival research in and around Belo Horizonte, Brazil. There, he has interviewed members of the Clube da Esquina (the Corner Club) music collective based around Milton Nascimento, luthiers producing the guitar-like viola (Brazilian ten-string guitar), and studied the Afro-Brazilian genre of Congado, among other topics. Grasse is author of the 331/3 Brazil book Milton Nascimento's and Lo Borges' Corner Club, examining the 1972 album Clube da Esquina. His assistance in archival research at São Paulo’s Oneyda Alvarenga municipal recording archive in Brazil is acknowledged in the liner notes of two CD recordings published by Smithsonian Folkways Recordings: The Discoteca Collection: Missão de Pesquisas Folclóricas, and L. H. Corrêa de Azevedo: Music of Ceará and Minas Gerais.

Previous to his work on Brazil, Grasse studied the Indonesian gamelan percussion orchestra beginning in 1986, performing as a community member with UC Berkeley's Sari Raras under the direction of Midiyanto and Ben Brinner, and Oakland's Mills College gamelan Si Betty, constructed by Lou Harrison and Bill Colvig, and directed by Jody Diamond. From 1987 to 1991, Grasse was a member of the Berkeley Gamelan directed by instrument builder and composer Daniel Schmidt, who encouraged him to compose several works for the ensemble. Grasse later co-authored the chapter on gamelan in a 1998 biographical work on Harrison written by then UC Santa Cruz professors Fred Lieberman and Leta Miller, before completing his UCLA doctoral monograph on that composer in 1999.
