= Toninho Horta =

Brazilian jazz guitarist and vocalist

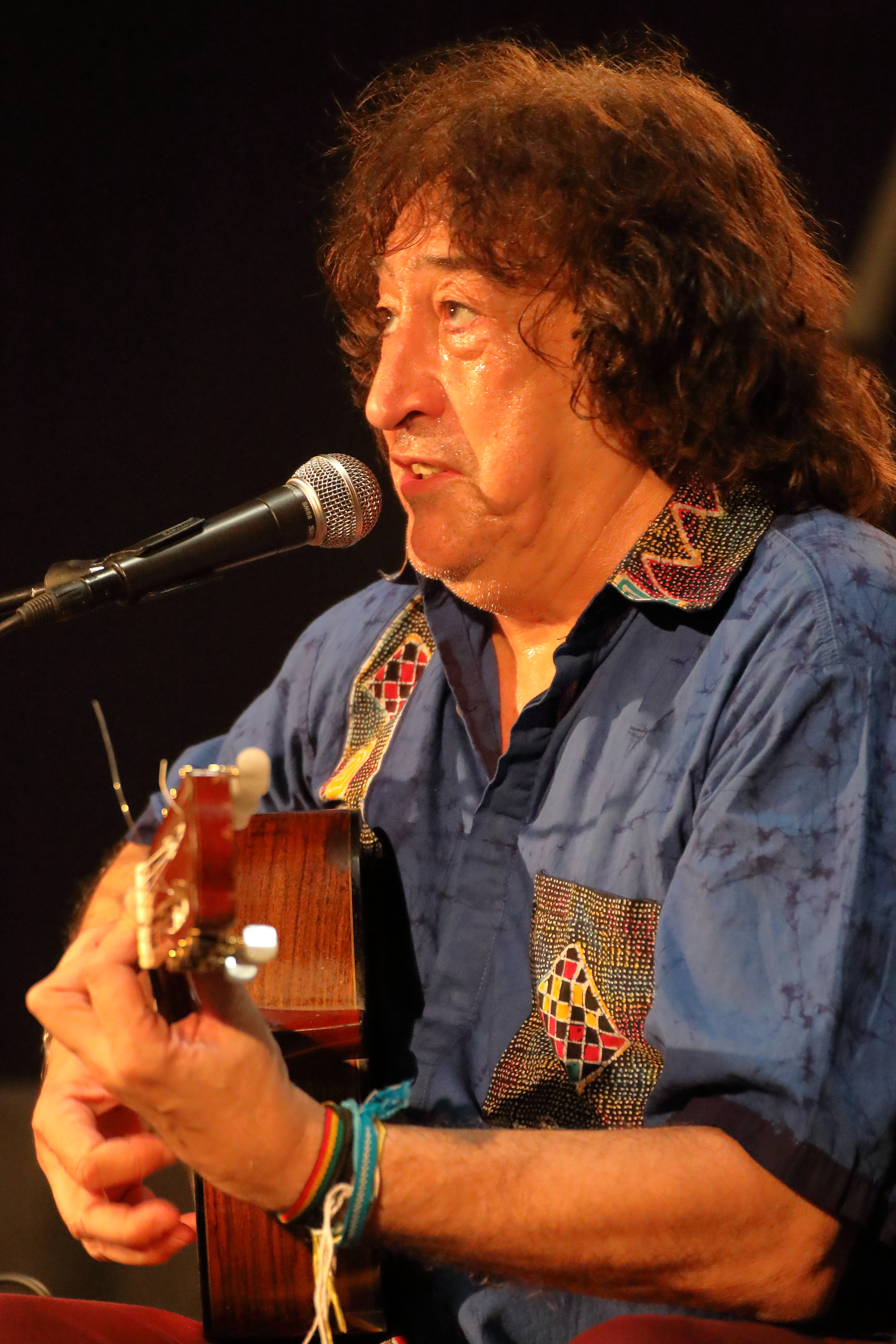

Background information
- Born: Antônio Maurício Horta de Melo; December 2, 1948 (age 77); Belo Horizonte, Minas Gerais, Brazil
- Genres: Jazz, Brazilian jazz
- Occupation: Musician
- Instrument: Guitar
- Years active: 1969–present
- Website: www.toninhohorta.com.br

Antônio Maurício Horta de Melo (born December 2, 1948) is a Brazilian jazz guitarist and vocalist.

In addition to composing and performing his own work, Horta has worked for many years as arranger or sideman for Brazilian artists such as Elis Regina, Milton Nascimento, Maria Bethânia, João Bosco, Airto Moreira, Edu Lobo, Nana Caymmi, Flora Purim, Gal Costa, Sérgio Mendes, Chico Buarque, Flávio Venturini, Joyce, Johnny Alf, Wagner Tiso, Francis Hime, and Beto Guedes.

== Music career ==
Horta grew up in Belo Horizonte, Brazil. When he was fourteen, he met Milton Nascimento, who became a lifelong friend and occasional collaborator. His work on Clube da Esquina (1972) by Nascimento led to opportunities with Antônio Carlos Jobim, João Bosco, Nana Caymmi, Gal Costa, and Elis Regina. His debut solo album was Terras Dos Passaros in 1980, released in the U.S. through Capitol Records in 1990. He moved to the U.S., and in time worked with Pat Metheny, Wayne Shorter, Sérgio Mendes, Philip Catherine, Herbie Hancock, Billy Higgins, George Duke, and the Manhattan Transfer.

== Awards and honors ==
- 5th best guitarist in the world by the British magazine "Melody Maker" in 1977.
- 7th best guitarist in 1978, by the same magazine.
- Honorary Citizen of the City of Austin (USA) in 1983.
- He integrates the anthology Progressions: 100 Years of Jazz (Legacy/Columbia, 2005), as one of the most influential jazz guitarists of the twentieth century.
- In 2012, it was included in the list of the 30 greatest Brazilian icons of the guitar and the guitar of the magazine Rolling Stone Brasil.
- Latin Grammy winner 2020 with the album Belo Horizonte.

== Discography ==
=== As leader ===
- Beto Guedes, Danilo Caymmi, Novelli, Toninho Horta (Odeon, 1973)
- Terra Dos Passaros (EMI, 1980)
- Toninho Horta (EMI, 1980)
- Diamond Land (Verve Forecast, 1988)
- Concerto Planeta Terra with Nelson Ayres, Nivaldo Ornelas, Márcio Montarroyos (IBM Brasil, 1989)
- Moonstone (Verve Forecast, 1989)
- Once I Loved with Gary Peacock, Billy Higgins (Verve, 1992)
- Durango Kid (Big World Music, 1993)
- Live in Moscow (B&W Records, 1994)
- Qualquer Canção with Carlos Fernando (Dubas Música, 1994)
- Foot on the Road (Verve Forecast, 1994)
- Durango Kid 2 (Big World Music, 1995)
- Sem Você with Joyce (Omagatoki, 1995)
- No Circo Voador with Flavio Venturini (Dubas Música, 1997)
- Serenade (Truspace, 1997)
- From Ton to Tom (Videoarts Music, 1998)
- Duets with Nicola Stilo (Via Veneto Jazz, 1999)
- Quadros Modernos with Juarez Moreira, Chiquito Braga (Minas, 2001)
- From Belo to Seoul with Jack Lee (Minas, 2001)
- Com o Pe no Forro (Minas, 2004)
- Toninho in Vienna (Pao Records, 2007)
- Cape Horn with Arismar do Espírito Santo (Porto das Canoas, 2007)
- Solo Ao Vivo (Minas, 2007)
- Tonight with Tom Lellis (Adventure Music, 2008)
- Harmonia e Vozes (Minas, 2010)
- Minas-Tokyo (Dear Heart, 2012)
- From Napoli to Belo Horizonte with Antonio Onorato (Sud Music/Minas, 2013)
- No Horizonte De Napoli with Stefano Silvestri (Minas, 2015)
- Alegria É Guardada Em Cofres, Catedrais with Alaíde Costa (Minas, 2015)
- Belo Horizonte (Think! Records, 2019)
- Shinkansen Group with Liminha, Marcos Suzano, Jaques Morelenbaum (Sony Music, 2020)
- Viva Eu with Barbara Casini (Encore Music, 2020)
- Bons Amigos with Dorota Miskiewicz (Dorota Miskiewicz, 2023)

=== As sideman ===
With Joao Bosco

- Caca A Raposa (RCA Victor, 1976)
- Galos de Briga (RCA Victor, 1976)
- Linha de Passe (RCA Victor, 1979)
- Tiro de Misericordia (RCA Victor, 1977)

With Joyce

- Music Inside (Verve Forecast, 1990)
- Bossa Duets (Sony BMG, 2003)
- 50 (Biscoito Fino, 2018)

With Milton Nascimento

- Clube da Esquina (Odeon, 1972)
- Milagre Dos Peixes (EMI, 1974)
- Milton (A&M, 1976)
- Geraes (EMI, 1976)
- Clube da Esquina 2 (EMI, 1978)
- Minas (Odeon, 1997)

With others

- Leny Andrade, Registro (CBS, 1979)
- Kenny Barron, Sambao (Verve/Gitanes, 1992)
- Fafa de Belem, Estrela Radiante (Philips, 1979)
- George Benson, Songs and Stories (Concord, 2009)
- Maria Bethania, Ciclo (Philips, 1983)
- Maria Bethania, Dezembros (RCA Victor, 1986)
- Fernando Brant, Vendedor de Sonhos (Biscoito Fino, 2019)
- Chico Buarque, Chico Buarque (Polygram 1993)
- Dorival Caymmi, Eu Nao Tenho Onde Morar (Odeon, 1960)
- Nana Caymmi, Nana Caymmi (CID, 1975)
- Michael Davis, Midnight Crossing (Lipstick, 1994)
- Gal Costa, India (Philips, 1973)
- Gal Costa, Agua Viva (Philips, 1978)
- George Duke, A Brazilian Love Affair (Epic 1980)
- Mark Egan, Beyond Words (Bluemoon, 1991)
- Michael Franks, Dragonfly Summer (Reprise, 1993)
- Gil Goldstein & Romero Lubambo, Infinite Love (Big World Music, 1993)
- Beto Guedes, Sol de Primavera (EMI, 1979)
- Maria Joao, Chorinho Feliz (Universal/Verve)
- Edu Lobo, Limite Das Aguas/Mestres da MPB Kardum, (Iris Music, 1977)
- Lo Borges, Lo Borges (Odeon, 1972)
- Jon Lucien, Listen Love (Mercury, 1991)
- Peter Madsen, Snuggling Snakes (Minor Music, 1993)
- The Manhattan Transfer, Brasil (Atlantic, 1987)
- Eugenia Melo e Castro, Eugenia Melo e Castro (PolyGram, 1986)
- Eugenia Melo e Castro, Um Gosto de Sol (Selo, 2011)
- Sergio Mendes, Horizonte Aberto (Som Livre, 1979)
- Sidney Miller, Linguas de Fogo (Sol Re Sol, 2015)
- Airto Moreira, Promises of the Sun (Arista, 1976)
- Juarez Moreira, Bom Dia (Bemol, 1989)
- Paulo Moura, Confusao Urbana, Suburbana e Rural (RCA Victor, 1976)
- Lisa Ono, Essencia Suite! (Supuesto!, 1997)
- Hermeto Pascoal, Viajando Com O Som (Far Out, 2017)
- Flora Purim, Nothing Will Be As It Was...Tomorrow (Warner Bros., 1977)
- Rufus Reid, Hues of a Different Blue (Motema, 2011)
- Nicola Stilo, Vira Vida (Via Venet, 2003)
- Luciana Souza, Duos III (Sunnyside/Universal 2012)
- Taiguara, Imyra, Tayra, Ipy Taiguara (Odeon, 1976)
- Wagner Tiso, Profissao: Musica (Philips, Polygram 1991)
- Flavio Venturini, Nascente (EMI, 1985)
- Arthur Verocai, Saudade Demais (Sonopress, 2002)
