= Lô Borges =

Brazilian singer-songwriter and guitarist (1952–2025)

- Lô Borges in 2013

Background information
- Born: Salomão Borges Filho; 10 January 1952; Belo Horizonte, Minas Gerais, Brazil
- Died: 2 November 2025 (aged 73) Belo Horizonte, Minas Gerais, Brazil
- Genres: MPB; progressive rock; experimental rock; folk rock; psychedelia; baroque pop; pop rock
- Occupations: Singer-songwriter; guitarist
- Instruments: Vocals; Acoustic guitar; Electric guitar; Piano; Bass; Percussion
- Years active: 1970–2025
- Formerly of: Clube da Esquina

Salomão Borges Filho (10 January 1952 – 2 November 2025), known professionally as Lô Borges (Brazilian Portuguese: [ˈlo ˈbɔʁʒis]), was a Brazilian singer-songwriter and guitarist.

Lô Borges was one of the founders of Clube da Esquina, a group of musicians that originated in the Brazilian state of Minas Gerais. He co-authored with Milton Nascimento the album Clube da Esquina in 1972, which was a milestone in Brazilian popular music. Among his most famous compositions are "Tudo Que Você Podia Ser", "Paisagem da Janela", "Para Lennon e McCartney", "Clube da Esquina No. 2", "Trem de Doido", "Dois Rios" and "O Trem Azul".

He is considered one of the most influential composers of Brazilian music, having been recorded by Tom Jobim, Elis Regina, Milton Nascimento, Flávio Venturini, Beto Guedes, Nenhum de Nós, Ira!, 14 Bis, Skank, Nando Reis, and Elba Ramalho, among others.

== Early life ==
Sixth of the eleven children of Maricota and Salomão Borges, Lô was born on 10 January, 1952 in Belo Horizonte, Brazil. As a teen, he became infatuated with the music of The Beatles and the Bossa Nova movement, gathering with other boys at the crossroads of Divinópolis and Paraisópolis streets in the Belo Horizonte neighborhood of Santa Tereza to sing, play, and converse about the music they loved. This corner, and the gatherings that took place there are where the group and album Clube da Esquina (the corner club) takes its name. Around this time, Borges encountered singer and songwriter Milton Nascimento (ten years his senior) playing guitar and singing in the stairwell of the apartment building they both lived in. The two became friends and began to collaborate on songs, including "Clube da Esquina" and "Para Lennon e McCartney" among others.

== Career ==
By the late 1960’s, Nascimento had become nationally famous recording multiple albums, some of which included songs written with Borges and other members of the Clube. In 1972, he returned to Belo Horizonte and to the corner in Santa Tereza, inviting a group of musical collaborators (Borges and his brother Marcio among them) to come to Rio De Janeiro and record the album that would become Clube Da Esquina. Using money from his previous musical success, Milton moved the group into in a large house in the Piratininga neighborhood of Niterói where they engaged in a period of intense creative activity. Borges, then not even 20 years old, would receive co credit as a leader on the album with Nascimento due to the volume of songs he contributed or collaborated on. In the years since its release, Clube Da Esquina has been widely acclaimed as one of the most influential albums in the history of Brazilian contemporary music.

During the recording of Clube Da Esquina, executives at the Odeon label recognized the talent of Borges through the songs he was contributing, offering him a contract to record a solo album the same year. Lô Borges self-titled album, known popularly as "disco do tênis" (the sneaker album) due to the photo of Borges’ Adidas tennis shoes on the cover also went on to become a cornerstone of 1970’s MPB classics. Upon finishing the record, Borges left Rio and went on sabbatical. Travelling by bus to Porto Alegre in the far south of Brazil for a time, then hitch hiking by truck to Arembepe, Bahia in the northeast of the country, returning home to Belo Horizonte some months later where he remained largely out of the public eye for the next 6 years.

Borges returned to music in 1978 contributing to Nascimento's album Clube da Esquina 2. In 1979, he released his much anticipated second solo album, A Via Láctea (the milky way). Containing songs like Equatorial (Lô Borges, Beto Guedes and Márcio Borges, 1979) and Vento de maio (Telo Borges and Márcio Borges, 1979). The end of the decade saw him team up with his siblings and a cast of contemporary MPB guest stars for the 1980 album Os Borges (The Borges).

In the '80s and '90s, the production of the composer decreased, with four records in total. The change in rhythm came when he approached 50 years old, around the time of Y2K.

With the success of the song "Dois Rios", a collaboration with Samuel Rosa and Nando Reis released by the group Skank in 2003, Borges began to make a name for himself in the market once again.

In 2007, Borges was granted an interview at the Museu da Pessoa, titled "Mistura Musical" (in English "Musical Mixture"), in which he remembered his childhood and his first experience with music. He also recounted meeting Milton Nascimento and the creation of Clube da Esquina.

In 2016, with Samuel Rosa, he released a live CD/DVD with their collaborations.

== Personal life and death ==
Lô Borges was the father of publisher Luca Arroyo Borges (born 1998) and was married to writer Patrícia Maês, who collaborated with him as a lyricist on several albums.

On 17 October 2025, Lô was hospitalized in Belo Horizonte for accidental medication poisoning. Over the course of two weeks his condition deteriorated, with him being placed in an ICU, on mechanical ventilation, undergoing a tracheotomy, and dialysis. He died due to multiple organ failure on 2 November 2025 at the age of 73.

Following the announcement of his death, large numbers of fans gathered at the corner of Divinópolis and Paraisópolis streets in Santa Tereza placing flowers and playing music there in his honor.

== Influence ==
In 2018, Alex Turner, from Arctic Monkeys, cited Borges' Aos Barões in a list of songs that inspired the album Tranquility Base Hotel & Casino. Borges was very happy about the mention, but was not that familiar with the band's music. He decided to listen to Turner's discography, which he enjoyed, with Tranquility Base being his favourite album.

== Discography ==
Studio albums

- Clube da Esquina (with Milton Nascimento) (1972)
- Lô Borges (1972)
- A Via-Láctea (1979)
- Os Borges (with Os Borges) (1980)
- Nuvem Cigana (1982)
- Sonho Real (1984)
- Meu Filme (1996)
- Feira Moderna (2001)
- Um Dia e Meio (2003)
- Bhanda (2006)
- Harmonia (2007)
- Horizonte Vertical (2011)
- Rio da Lua (2019)
- Dínamo (2020)
- Muito Além do Fim (2021)
- Chama Viva (2022)
- Não Me Espere na Estação (2023)
- Tobogã (2024)
- Céu de Giz (2025)

Live albums

- Solo (1987)
- Intimidade (2008)
- Ao vivo no Cine Theatro Brasil (with Samuel Rosa) (2016)
- Tênis + Clube: Ao vivo no Circo Voador (2018)
