= Johnny Alf =

Brazilian musician (1929–2010)

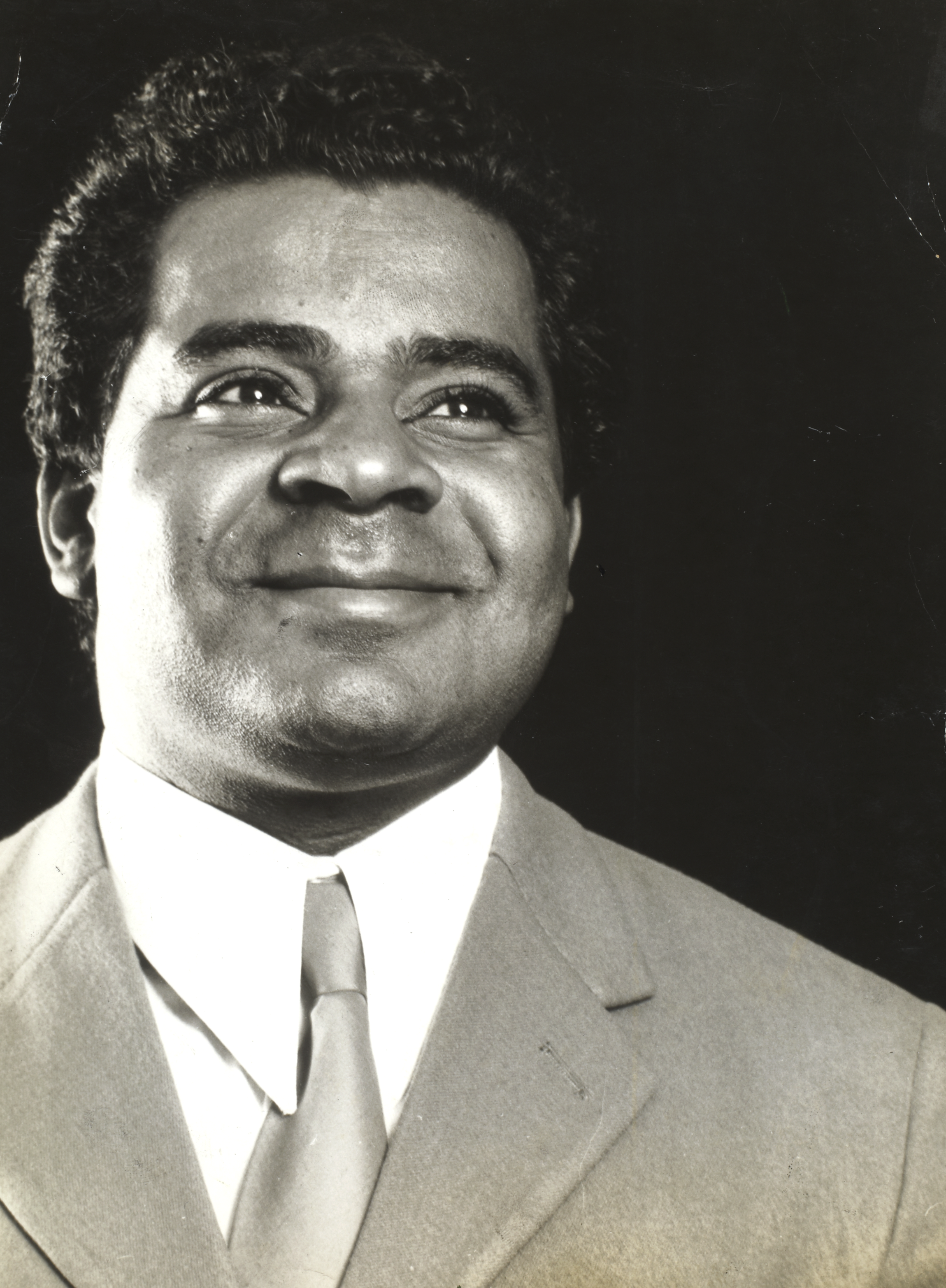
- Johnny Alf

Background information
- Born: Alfredo José da Silva; May 19, 1929; Rio de Janeiro
- Died: March 4, 2010 (aged 80) Santo André, Brazil
- Occupations: Musician, teacher

Alfredo José da Silva (May 19, 1929 – March 4, 2010), popularly known as Johnny Alf, was a Brazilian musician, sometimes known as the "Father of Bossa Nova".

Alf was born in Vila Isabel, Rio de Janeiro, and began playing piano at age 9. His father died when he was 3 and he was raised by his mother, who worked as a maid to raise him. He attended Colégio Pedro II, receiving support from his mother's employers. He played in nightclubs in the Copacabana neighborhood of Rio, where he was noticed by later bossa nova pioneers. His first single, "Falseta" was released in 1952, with a debut album following in 1961.

Over his career, he recorded nine albums and appeared on nearly fifty others. He died in 2010, aged 80, from prostate cancer.

== Early life ==
Johnny Alf (b. Alfredo José da Silva) was born on May 19, 1929, in Vila Isabel, Rio de Janeiro, Brazil. Alf's father, an army corporal, fought in the Brazilian civil war of 1932, the Constitutionalist Revolution, and perished in combat in the valley of Paraíba. His mother raised him alone, making a living as a maid. She found employment with a family in Tijuca, a quarter close to the centre of Rio. The family of the household, as well as being very welcoming to both Johnny and his mother, had much respect for music and supported Alf as he began to discover the art form.

Alfredo's mother was able to enroll him at the IBEU (Instituto Brasil-Estados Unidos or Brazilian-American Institute), and it was there that Alf received his first formal musical training, studying classical piano with instructor Geni Bálsamo; it was there too that young Alfredo earned the Americanized nickname that would accompany him through the entirety of his musical career. Due to his purported shyness Alf spent much more of his time listening to records (the music of the Nat “King” Cole Trio (Nat King Cole) and of the strongly classically influenced English pianist George Shearing being specific favorites) than practicing his technical skills on the piano. It was Alf's growing desire to enhance his technical abilities on the piano that led him to seek acceptance into the recently founded Sinatra-Farney Fan Club. The Sinatra-Farney Fan Club was a performer's collective of sorts, an appreciation for the crooning vocal jazz epitomized by artists such as Frank Sinatra, Bing Crosby, and Brazilian born Dick Farney (b. Farnésio Dutra, a Carioca) being the thread that unified all of its members. Alf's membership in the club finally allowed him regular access to a piano (which he was permitted to use for practice only on weeknights that had no other scheduled club activities), as well as a group of musically sympathetic peers with which to play and experiment. The jam sessions held by the Sinatra-Farney Fan Club provided Alf his first taste of collaborative music-making and public, musical performance, the club's status being respectable enough around Rio for its members to be allowed to play (without pay) venues such as the Tijuca Tennis Club, the Fluminense Club, and the Athletic Association of the Bank of Brazil. In 1950 the death of the mother of two of the founding members stranded the club without a rehearsal headquarters and it was at this point that Alf began to pursue a professional musical career.

== Career ==
Alf received his first professional break in 1952 when he was hired (on Dick Farney's recommendation) as the pianist at the newly inaugurated Cantina do César where his appointed task was, apparently, to “aid the digestion of the guests”. The food proving in most a cases a meager incentive for the customers’ return, the cantina's owner, César de Alencar (a popular radio host in Rio at the time), soon converted the space into a proper club—or inferninho (little hell)—and gave Johnny Alf free musical reign. Alf would receive frequent visits from artists such as pianist João Donato, vocalist Dolores Duran, and guitarist/vocalist João Gilberto would often accompany his colleagues in a duet or two before they were on their way. The musical fare in the first years of Alf's professional career rarely varied from the usual samba-canções (meaning, simply, samba-songs) and foxtrots, however Alf's familiarity with American Jazz styles imbued his playing, his vocal performances, and his on-stage banter with the mystery and prestige of New York's 52nd Street. As Alf's modest reputation slowly grew he managed to catch the eye of producer Ramalho Neto, who expressed interest in recording Alf. This brief pairing would produce Alf's first two recordings. Alf assembled a trio (in the style of Nat “King” Cole) composed of guitarist Garoto, double-bassist Vidal, and himself on Piano and recorded two tunes: “Falseta” (Deceit) composed by Alf himself, and “De cigarro em cigarro” (From Cigarette to Cigarette) composed by fellow Brazilian Luiz Bonfá. The recordings garnered no more than a pittance of recognition for Alf at the time, but would later (in the early 1960s) be hailed as the progenitors of the Bossa Nova style.

Various opinions are now held about the validity of such a statement, but it can confidently be said that these two recordings displayed a largely novel sound, one that had not yet been heard by the majority of Brazilians. Following these sessions Alf would continue to find nightly work in the clubs of Rio de Jainero, musical companions such as João Gilberto, João Donato, and eventually the young pianist Antonio Carlos Jobim, following him from venue to venue provided they could afford the cover fee. For two years Alf contented himself with ephemeral engagements at clubs including the Monte Carlo in Gávea, the Clube da Chave, the Mandarim, and the Drink before settling at the Hotel Plaza nightclub in 1954. The Hotel Plaza nightclub was known throughout Copacabana as a haunted venue, which conveniently allowed Alf the freedom to experiment musically to a degree that would not have been possible had he been playing for anyone other than his loyal fan-base. He was able to play his own early compositions (“Rapaz De Bem”, “Céu E Mar”, and “O Que É Amar” among others) in a professional setting as well as the compositions of his colleagues and fellow innovators. During the early hours of the evening before the club had attracted any audience, Alf would hold impromptu jam sessions with whoever happened to show up and it was by way of these improvisatory collaborations that the harmonic and rhythmic structures that would eventually blossom into the style now known as Bossa Nova, were originally developed. While Alf's tenure at the Plaza Hotel may have been musically and artistically convenient it was far from economically convenient and when, in 1955, Alf was offered a position as the house pianist at a new club, Baiúca, opening in São Paulo, he jumped at the opportunity, even though it meant leaving the tight-knit musical community he had helped to create in Rio.

At Baiúca Alf would form a duo with himself on the piano and double-bassist Sabá. Unfortunately, however, the group had time only to establish a moderate following before the Baiúca was closed down for reasons pertaining to health-code violations. Once again Alf found himself pounding the pavement on a nightly basis in search of steady work and, while he never starved he began (by the estimations of some) to stagnate musically. The musicians Alf had left in Rio had continued to innovate in his absence while he himself had had no time for anything more than the work required to earn his daily wages. By the time Alf recorded his first full-length LP (“Rapaz De Bem”) in 1961 his songs had begun to sound stale. That same year Alf, who had never been fond of the term Bossa Nova, and had always tried to distance himself from the connotations the title entailed, declined an invitation to play at Carnegie Hall's historic Bossa Nova Festival. Alf's decision not to attend the aforementioned festival marks a decisive point in his professional history. After 1961, very little was heard from Alf, although he continued to produce albums infrequently throughout the 60s and early 70s, many of which display a sound very similar to that which was displayed on “Rapaz De Bem.” The rest of Alf's career would be spent in São Paulo, collaborating with other artists from time to time, occasionally embarking on solo recording projects, and earning most of his living from his performances in the clubs of São Paulo. Alf would eventually gain employment at a local conservatory of music.

== Death ==
Johnny Alf died on March 4, 2010, in Santo Andre, Brazil (just outside São Paulo, his home of the past fifty years) of complications caused by prostate cancer. He left no immediate survivors.

== Music ==
Alf's first recordings (“Falseta” and “De cigarro em cigarro”) were similar rhythmically and structurally to the well-known samba-canções of the day, they differed only in their harmonic richness and their melodies, both of which aspects were heavily influenced by American jazz styles and improvisations of the late 1940s and early 1950s. Alf's live playing at the Plaza Hotel was heavily influenced by jazz and “stamped with the imprimatur of George Shearing [and] Lennie Tristano”. New York Times columnist Larry Rohter relates, on behalf of Alf's music, that it possessed “a light and airy feeling that expressed the optimism and joie de vivre that Brazilians think of as among their defining national traits”. Alf has said of his own music: “I always played in my own style […] I had the idea of joining Brazilian music with jazz. I try to bring everything together to achieve an agreeable result”.

== Legacy ==
Much conjecture surrounds the significance of Alf's role in the development of the Bossa Nova style. Many believe the title ‘Father of Bossa Nova’ to be hyperbolic while others believe firmly that Alf's earliest recordings (“Falceta”, “Rapaz de Bem”, etc.) paved the way for the entire stylistic shift that became Bossa Nova. While we cannot lay to rest these disagreements we can say confidently that Johnny Alf was, in his endeavor to mix traditional Brazilian music with American jazz, a sound innovator, and a great influence and inspiration to his peers, some of whom would go on to acquire fame under the heading Bossa Nova. “From him I learned all of the modern harmonies that Brazilian music began to use in the bossa nova, samba-jazz and instrumental songs” said pianist and arranger João Donato, “He opened the doors for us with his way of playing piano, with its jazz influence. When my generation arrived, he had already planted the seeds” added guitarist and composer Carlos Lyra.

== Discography ==
Singles:

- "Falseta"/"De Cigarro em Cigarro" (1952)
- "Rapaz de Bem" (1955)
- "Samba do Retorno"/"Eu e a Brisa" (1968)

As main artist/leader:

- Rapaz de Bem (RCA, 1961)
- Diagonal (RCA, 1964)
- Johnny Alf (Mocambo, 1965)
- Eu e a Brisa (Mocambo, 1966)
- Ele É Johnny Alf (Parlophone, 1971)
- Nós (Odeon, 1974)
- Desbunde Total (Chantecler, 1978)
- Olhos Negros (RCA, 1990)
- with Leandro Braga, Letra & Música: Noel Rosa (Luminar, 1997)
- Cult Alf (Natasha, 1998)
- with Dom Pedro Casaldáliga, As Sete Palavras de Cristo na Cruz (Paulinas, 1999)
- Eu e a Bossa (Rob Digital, 1999)

Credited as writer/arranger:

- "Céu e Mar"/Eddie Harris (Vee Jay Records, 1963)
- "Bossa Só" (Rozenblit, 1965)
- "Rapaz de Bem"/Lalo Schifrin (Verve Records, 1968)
- "Sky & Sea"/The 5th Dimension (Bell Records, 1972)
- "Solo Tu Amor"/Martinha (UA Latino, 1972)
- "Eu e a Brisa"/Baden Powell (Imagem, 1973)
- "O Que É Amar"/Tania Maria (Medley Records, 1979)
- "Diza"/Azymuth (Milestone Records, 1988)
- "Fim de Semana"/Tenório Jr. (Dubas Música, 1989)
- "Ilusão à Toa"; "O Que É Amar"/Leila Pinheiro (Philips, 1989)
- "Céu e Mar"/Lenny Andrade (BMG Ariola Discos Ltda., 1993)
- "Um Tema P’ro Simon" (Compilation) (Blue Note, 1994)
- "Rapaz de Bem"/Ramón Leal & Beatrice Binotti (Siesta, 1999)
- "Eu e a Brisa"/Caetano Veloso (Universal Music, 2001)
- "Plexus"/Joyce (Sony BMG Music Entertainment; Epic, 2003)
- "Rapaz de Bem"/Gilson Peranzzetta (Marari Discos, 2005)
- "Céu e Mar"/Meirelles E Os Copa 5 (Dubas Música; Universal Music, 2005)
- "Decisão"/Zimbo Trio (Discobertas 2011)
- "Céu e Mar"/Leila Pinheiro & Nelson Faria (Far Out Recordings, 2012)
