= Angelus (album) =

Studio album by Milton Nascimento
- Released: 1994
- Label: Warner Bros.

Milton Nascimento chronology
Três Pontas (1993)	Angelus (1994)	O Planeta Blue na Estrada do Sol (1994)

Angelus is an album by the Brazilian musician Milton Nascimento, released in 1994.

The album peaked at No. 8 on Billboard's World Albums chart. It was nominated for a Grammy Award, in the "Best World Music Album" category. Nascimento promoted the album by opening the 1994 JVC Jazz Festival.

== Production ==
James Taylor sang on "Only a Dream in Rio", which also employed a Brazilian accordion. Peter Gabriel duetted on "Qualquer Coisa a Haver Com o Paraiso"; "Estrelada" is a duet with Jon Anderson. Wayne Shorter, Herbie Hancock, Jack DeJohnette, and Pat Metheny played on some of the songs. "Hello Goodbye" is a cover of the Beatles song; a few tracks are versions of older Nascimento songs.

== Critical reception ==
Professional ratings
Review scores
Source	Rating
AllMusic	3/5 stars
Chicago Sun-Times	3.5/4 stars

The Philadelphia Inquirer called the album "a collection of carnival songs, jazz explorations and outright pop ... that celebrates Nascimento as one of the world's vocal treasures while demonstrating his versatility." The Baltimore Sun wrote: "Blessed with lithe, flowing melodies and rich, jazz-tinged arrangements, its lush lyricism hearkens back to Nascimento's great albums of the '70s."

The Milwaukee Sentinel determined that "Nascimento is the mourning dove of Brazilian singers, and he often lapses into keening chants that seem to bespeak of loves lost or funerals attended." The New York Times opined: "Characteristically for Mr. Nascimento's work, Angelus vacillates between kitsch and the sublime and is aimed at fans of both." The Chicago Sun-Times concluded that "the songwriter's homage to the Beatles, a somber and jazzy take on 'Hello Goodbye', boasts an economical string arrangement that would make George Martin proud."

AllMusic wrote that "the state of Nascimento's songwriting imagination remains in a moderate slump, made glaringly evident by the inclusion of so much superior early music."

== Track listing ==
No.	Title	Length
1.	"Seis Horas da Tarde"
2.	"Estrelada"
3.	"De Um Modo Geral..."
4.	"Angelus"
5.	"Coisas de Minas"
6.	"Hello Goodbye"
7.	"Sofro Calado"
8.	"Clube da Esquina No 2"
9.	"Meu Veneno"
10.	"Only a Dream in Rio"
11.	"Qualquer Coisa a Haver Com o Paraiso"
12.	"Vera Cruz"
13.	"Novena"
14.	"Amor Amigo"
15.	"Sofro Calado"
