= Clube da Esquina =

Brazilian musical artist collective

Clube da Esquina (Portuguese pronunciation: [ˈklubi dɐjsˈkinɐ], in English "Corner Club") was a Brazilian music artists collective, originating in the Brazilian state of Minas Gerais. It is also the name of a double album from 1972. Clube da Esquina mixes baroque pop, progressive rock, bossa nova and jazz styles, with Brazilian folk music and classical music influences. The Beatles and the Platters were also an important influence on Clube da Esquina.

Together with Tropicália, Clube da Esquina is usually regarded as the Brazilian musical movement that achieved the greatest international resonance in the post-bossa nova period (beginning in the late 1960s and early 1970s).

== History of Clube da Esquina ==
In 1963 Milton Nascimento moved from Três Pontas, in the midlands of the state of Minas Gerais, to the capital Belo Horizonte, looking for work. He settled at the Levy Building, where he found his future collaborators, the Borges family, including Márcio Borges and Lô Borges. Milton and Márcio started composing (Milton had already played in some bars of Belo Horizonte): Márcio wrote the lyrics, and Milton wrote the music. Ever since, Márcio has played an important role in the history of Clube de Esquina as a lyricist, mainly together with, at a later stage, Fernando Brant.

In 1972, the first LP was recorded for EMI, Clube da Esquina. While it was released under Milton's and Lô's names and featured many compositions and contributions from them, it was a collaborative effort of many members of the collective. It was a double LP and had a youth group, and it attracted attention because of its engaging compositions, its patchwork of sounds, and its poetic richness. The group wrote a part of one of the most important chapters in the history of Brazilian popular music. It drew the attention of musicians from Brazil and abroad with its artistic daring and innovative creativity.

At the time, critics lacked the ability to understand what was happening and made harsh comments about the work. But the album had soon won international recognition and prestige in Brazil. The album and its creators became the head of a network musicians around the world, making it a benchmark of style and aesthetics in contemporary music.

It was followed by another album in 1978 (Clube da Esquina 2), which contained tracks written by artists who were not part of the original group (such as Chico Buarque).

== Clube da Esquina musicians and bands ==
- Milton Nascimento
- 14 Bis
- Toninho Horta
- Tavinho Moura
- Tavito
- Lô Borges
- Beto Guedes
- Wagner Tiso
- Fernando Brant (lyricist)
- Ronaldo Bastos (lyricist)
- Nelson Ângelo
- Márcio Borges (lyricist)
- Flávio Venturini
- Chiquito Braga

== Sources ==
- Chapter 4 of Charles A. Perrone, Masters of Contemporary Brazilian Song: MPB 1965-1985 ( U TX P, 1989) on Milton Nascimento and friends.
