= Chris Evans (journalist) =

British journalist

Christopher Evans (born 1968) is a British journalist and the editor of The Daily Telegraph since 2014. Also Director of Content at The Telegraph Group, he was previously Executive Head of News at The Daily Telegraph.

Since 2024, Evans serves as Chairman of the IPSO Editors' Code of Practice Committee.

== Early life ==
Born and raised at Walsall, Staffordshire, Evans was educated at King Edward's School in Birmingham before going up to read English at Brasenose College, Oxford.

== Career ==
Having left Oxford after one year without graduating, Evans studied Newspaper Journalism (Post Grad) under Daily Mail doyenne Maggie Henfield, at the University of Central Lancashire, Preston. Evans embarked upon his career as a journalist in 1992 at a news agency - the South West News Service in Bristol.

Then after 11 years' reporting for The Daily Mail, Evans joined The Daily Telegraph as a news editor in January 2007. He was recruited by The Daily Telegraph's then editor, Sir William Lewis, on strong advice from his deputy, Tony Gallagher, now editor of The Times. Said to have a "solid news background" with populist news instincts, Evans "kept a low profile" during his rise to a senior role.

In 2017, Evans expressed his view that fake news is "great" for the news industry, in the sense that it fosters more trust in traditional news brands by contrast, thus "increasing [their] value".

In 2023 Viscount Rothermere tried unsuccessfully to poach Evans for the editorship of The Daily Mail.

On 3 January 2024 Evans was appointed by IPSO as Chairman of its Editors' Code of Practice Committee, having served as a lay member since 2022.

== Personal life ==
Evans is married, with two children and lives in Finsbury Park, London.

Media offices
Preceded by Tony Gallagher	Editor of The Daily Telegraph; 2014–present	Incumbent
