= Paulo Moura =

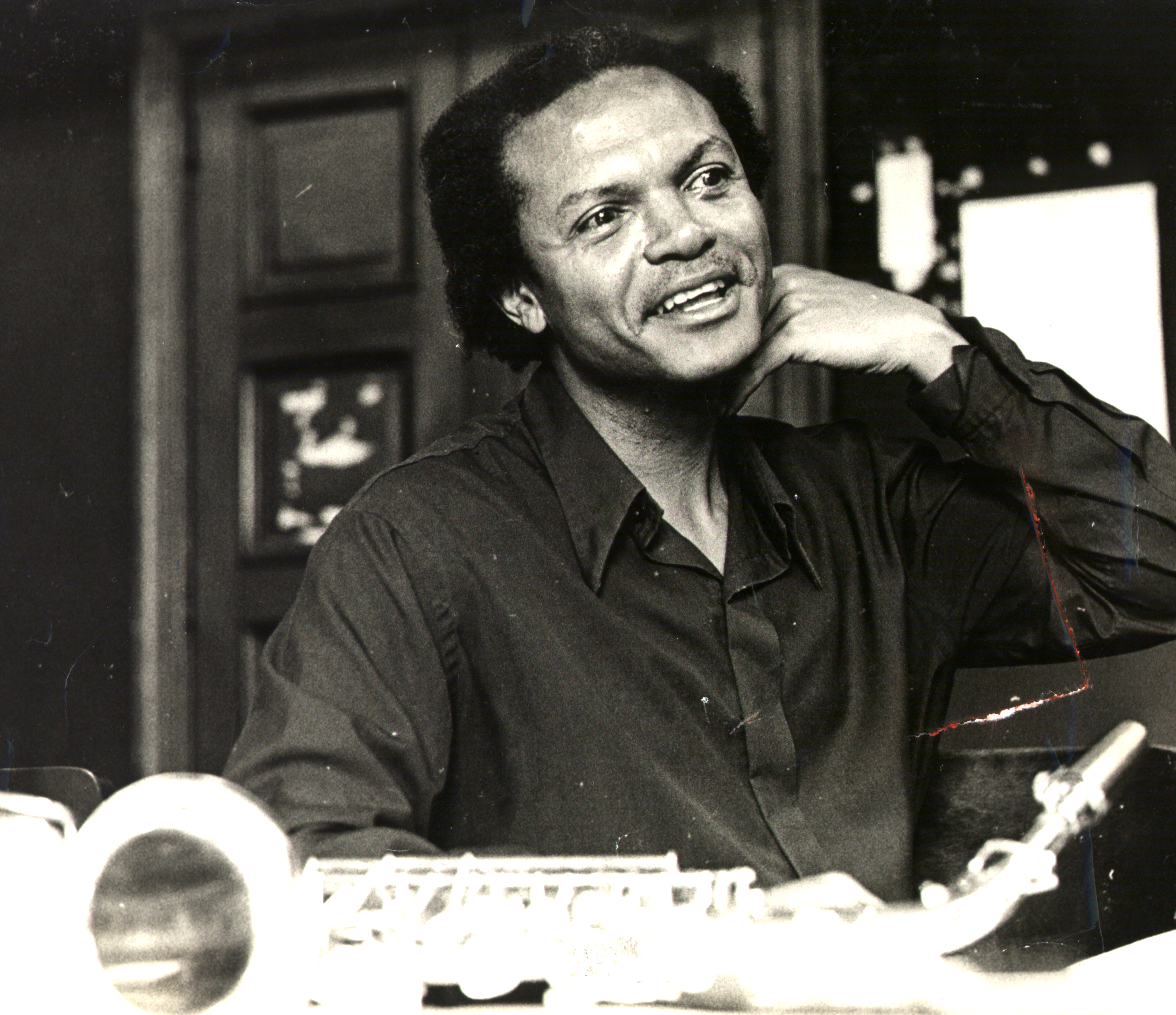

Background information
- Born: 15 July 1932; São José do Rio Preto, São Paulo, Brazil
- Died: 12 July 2010 (aged 77) Rio de Janeiro, Brazil
- Genres: jazz swing choro
- Instruments: clarinet saxophone
- Years active: 1956–2010
- Website: www.paulomoura.com.br

Paulo Moura (15 July 1932 – 12 July 2010) was a Brazilian clarinetist and saxophonist.

Born in São José do Rio Preto, where his father was the maestro of a marching band and encouraged his son to train as a tailor, Paulo instead studied in the National Music School and performed with the Brazilian Symphonic Orchestra. He was the first black artist to become the first clarinetist in the Municipal Theatre Orchestra. He appeared at Bossa Nova night at Carnegie Hall in 1962 with Sérgio Mendes, the two of them also featuring on Cannonball Adderley's 1962 album, Cannonball's Bossa Nova. He won the Sharp Award for the most popular instrumentalist of the year in 1992.

His CD Paulo Moura e Os Oito Batutas was listed by Barnes & Noble as one of the top 10 recommendations of the year for 1998. From 1997 to 1999, he was on the State Council of Culture in Rio de Janeiro, a Councillor of the Federal Council of Music, and President of the Museum Foundation of Image and Sound. In 2000, Moura became the first Brazilian instrumentalist to win the Latin Grammy. Moura died of lymphoma. His last informal musical gathering happened on July 10, 2010, and included David Feldman (musician), Daniela Spielmann, Marcello Gonçalves, Gabriel Moura, Humberto Araujo and Wagner Tiso. He married Halina Grynberg and had two sons, Pedro and Domingos.

== Discography ==
- Moto Perpétuo. Chantecler, 1956.
- Sweet Sax. RCA Victor, 1957.
- Escolha e Dance com Paulo Moura. Sinter Discos, 1959.
- Paulo Moura Interpreta Radamés Gnatalli. Continental, 1960.
- Tangos e Boleros. Chantecler, 1962.
- Cannonball's Bossa Nova (1962), with Cannonball Adderley
- Do the Bossa Nova with Herbie Mann, Latin Fever (1962), with Herbie Mann
- Paulo Moura e Hecteto: Mensagem. Equipe, 1968.
- Paulo Moura e Quarteto. Equipe, 1969.
- Paulo Moura e Hecteto: Fibra. Equipe, 1970.
- Pilantocracia. Equipe, 1971.
- Confusão Urbana, Suburbana e Rural. RCA Victor, 1976.
- Concertão. Kuarup, 1981.
- Paulo Moura e Clara Sverner. Odeon, 1983.
- Mistura e Manda. Kuarup, 1984.
- Paulo Moura e Clara Sverner: Vou Vivendo. Kuarup, 1986.
- Paulo Moura e Clara Sverner: Vou Vivendo. Odeon, 1986.
- Gafieira Etc. e Tal. Kuarup, 1986.
- Paulo Moura e Clara Sverner Interpretam Pixinguinha. CBS, 1988.
- Quarteto Negro: Paulo Moura, Jorge Degas, Zezé Mota e Djalma Corrêa. Kuarup, 1988.
- Paulo Moura Interpreta Dorival Caymmi. Chorus, 1991.
- Rio Nocturne. Messidor, 1992.
- Dois Irmãos: Paulo Moura e Raphael Rabello. Milestone Records, 1992.
- Paulo Moura e Wagner Tiso. Tom Brasil, 1996.
- Paulo Moura e Os Batutas. Rob Digital, 1997. Winner of the 2000 Latin Grammy.
- Mood Ingenuo: Paulo Moura and Cliff Korman duo. Jazzheads, 1999.
- Paulo Moura visita Jobim e Gershwin. Pau Brasil, 2000.
- K-Ximblues. Rob Digital, 2002.
- Estação Leopoldina. MecBR, 2003.
- El Negro del blanco. Biscoito Fino, 2004.
- Fruto Maduro with André Sachs, Biscoito Fino 2012
