= Wagner Tiso =

Brazilian musician (born 1945)

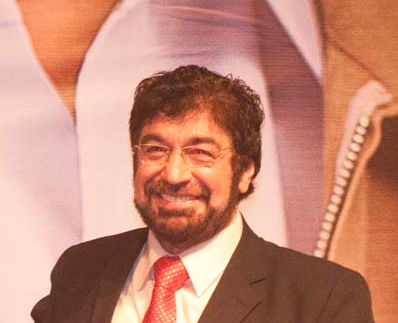
Wagner Tiso

Wagner Tiso Veiga (born 12 December 1945) is a musician, arranger, conductor, pianist and composer from Brazil.

Born in Três Pontas, Tiso learned music theory with Paulo Moura and specialised in keyboards. In 1970, he joined Som Imaginário, working with Milton Nascimento. Tiso and Nascimento were then together in Clube da Esquina, who toured internationally. The group also included Beto Guedes, Toninho Horta and Flávio Venturini. He has also worked on several soundtracks.
