= Fernando Brant =

Brazilian poet, journalist, and lyricist (1946–2015)

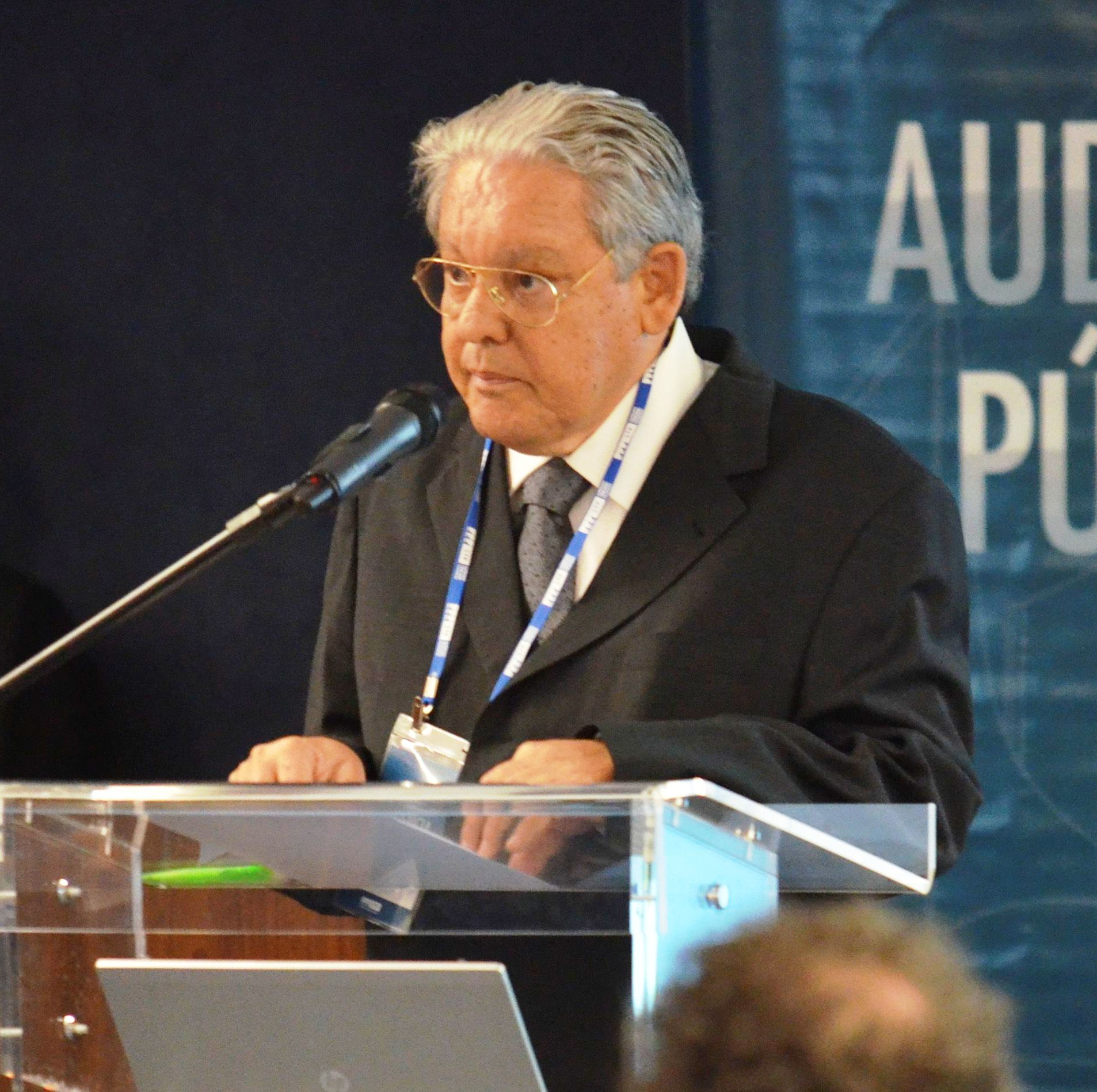
Fernando Brant participates in the public hearing on amendments to the Law of Copyright, in STF, Brasília

Fernando Rocha Brant (October 9, 1946 – June 12, 2015) was a Brazilian poet, lyricist and journalist, born in Caldas, Minas Gerais.

Brant's interest in music and literature began to increase while he studied law at Universidade Federal de Minas Gerais.

At the beginning of the 1960s, Brant made friends with Milton Nascimento who soon became his creative partner and encouraged him to write his first lyrics, "Travessia". The song won the second place in the II Festival International da Canção (International Song Festival) in Rio de Janeiro in 1967. In the same year, "Travessia" was included in Nascimento's first album and became one of the better known songs in his repertoire.

In 1969, Brant got a job as a journalist in O Cruzeiro magazine affiliate in Belo Horizonte. That same year, in Belo Horizonte, Brant and friends began articulating a project that would become Clube da Esquina, an influential Brazilian music artists collective.

His partnership with Milton Nascimento resulted in over 200 songs recorded by the most respected artists in Brazil.

Among Milton-Brant most famous compositions are "Travessia", "Maria Maria", "Canção da América", "Encontros e Despedidas", "Ponta de Areia", and "Nos Bailes da Vida".

Brant composed more than 300 songs with multiple partners. He also wrote scripts and lyrics for ballets and plays, and soundtracks for Brazilian films and telenovelas.

On June 12, 2015, Fernando Brant died in Belo Horizonte from complications of a second liver transplantation surgery.
