= Beto Guedes =

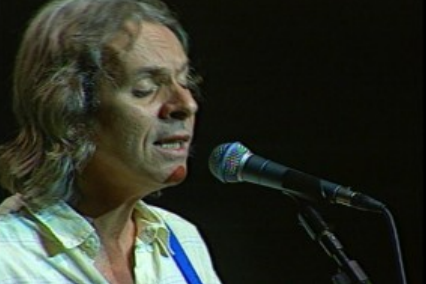

Background information
- Born: Alberto de Castro Guedes; August 13, 1951 (age 75); Montes Claros, Minas Gerais, Brazil
- Genres: Música popular brasileira, Brazilian rock, psychedelic rock, progressive rock
- Occupations: Singer, songwriter
- Instruments: Vocals, guitar
- Years active: 1966–present
- Website: betoguedes.com.br

Alberto de Castro Guedes (born August 13, 1951) is a Brazilian singer, songwriter, and guitarist.

== Biografia ==
Beto Guedes toca em bandas desde a adolescência. Quando tinha 18 anos participou do V Festival Internacional de Cantores, com a música "Feira Moderna", composta em conjunto com Fernando Brant. Formou o grupo musical Clube da Esquina com Milton Nascimento, Lô Borges, e Fernando Brant. A tradição mineira da música folclórica foi a principal influência do grupo, junto com o rock dos anos 1960 e o choro. Sua próxima banda foi a banda 14 Bis. Em 1977 gravou seu primeiro disco, "A Página do Relâmpago Elétrico", que foi um sucesso inesperado. Em 1978, lançou o LP "Amor de Índio", cuja música-título foi o maior sucesso da carreira de Guedes.

== Discography ==
- Beto Guedes, Danilo Caymmi, Novelli, Toninho Horta (Odeon, 1973)
- A Página do Relâmpago Elétrico (EMI, 1977)
- Amor de Índio (EMI, 1978)
- Sol de Primavera (EMI, 1979)
- Contos da Lua Vaga (EMI, 1981)
- Viagem das Mãos (EMI, 1984)
- Alma de Borracha (EMI, 1986)
- Beto Guedes Ao Vivo (EMI, 1987)
- Andaluz (EMI, 1991)
- Dias de Paz (Epic, 1999)
- 50 Anos Ao Vivo (Epic, 2002)
- Em Algum Lugar (Epic, 2004)
- Outros Clássicos - Beto Guedes Ao Vivo (Biscoito Fino, 2010)

== See also ==
- Flávio Venturini
- Lô Borges
- Clube da Esquina
