= List of Brazilian musicians =

This is a list of Brazilian musicians, musicians born in Brazil or who have Brazilian citizenship or residency.

== Classical music ==
- Alberto Nepomuceno (1864–1920), classical musician and composer
- Alexandre Levy (1864–1892), classical composer, pianist and conductor
- André da Silva Gomes (1752–1844), classical musician and sacred music composer
- Antonietta Rudge (1885–1974), classical pianist
- Bidu Sayão (1902–1999), opera soprano
- Brasílio Itiberê da Cunha (1846–1913), classical composer, lawyer and Brazilian diplomat
- Camargo Guarnieri (1907–1993), classical musician and composer
- Clarice Assad (1978–), classical composer
- Carlos Gomes (1836–1896), classical musician and composer
- César Guerra-Peixe (1914–1993), classical musician and composer
- Cláudio Santoro (1919–1989), classical musician and composer
- Elias Álvares Lobo (1834–1901), classical musician and composer
- Francisco Braga (1868–1945), classical composer, conductor and teacher
- Francisco Gomes da Rocha (1754–1808), classical composer
- Francisco Manuel da Silva (1795–1865), classical musician and composer
- Maria Alice de Mendonça, pianist and composer
- Francisco Mignone (1897–1986), classical composer and conductor
- Gilberto Mendes (1922–2016), classical composer
- Guiomar Novaes (1895–1979), classical pianist
- Hans-Joachim Koellreutter (1915–2005), composer, teacher and musicologist
- Heitor Villa-Lobos (1887–1959), classical musician and composer
- Henrique Oswald (1852–1931), composer and pianist
- Jorge Antunes (1942–), classical musician and composer
- José Antônio Rezende de Almeida Prado (1943–2010), classical musician, pianist and composer
- José Carlos Amaral Vieira (1952–), classical musician, pianist and composer
- José Joaquim Emerico Lobo de Mesquita (1746–1805), classical musician and composer
- José Maurício Nunes Garcia (1767–1830), classical musician and composer
- Leopoldo Miguez (1850–1902), classical musician and composer
- Luiz Hernane Barros De Carvalho, cellist
- Magda Tagliaferro (1893–1986), classical pianist and teacher
- Maria d'Apparecida (1926–2017), opera singer
- Marlos Nobre (1939–2024), classical musician and composer
- Nelson Freire (1944–2021), classical pianist
- Osvaldo Lacerda (1927–2011), classical musician and composer
- Radamés Gnattali (1906–1988), classical composer, conductor, orchestrator and arranger
- Yara Bernette (1920–2002), classical pianist

== Samba ==
- Adoniran Barbosa (1912–1982), singer and composer
- Alcione Nazaré (1947–), singer
- Arlindo Cruz (1958-2025), singer, musician and composer
- Ary Barroso (1903–1964), singer and composer
- Beth Carvalho (1946–2019), singer
- Braguinha (1907–2006), singer and composer
- Carmen Miranda (1909–1955), singer, dancer and actress
- Cartola (1908–1980), singer and composer
- Clara Nunes (1943–1983), singer and composer
- Edson Ribeiro (1972–), musician, footballer and composer
- Elizeth Cardoso (1920–1990), singer
- Elza Soares (1930–2022), singer
- Fernanda Porto (1965–), singer and composer
- Jamelão (1913–2008), singer
- João Nogueira (1941–2000), singer and composer
- Jorge Aragão (1949–), singer and composer
- Noel Rosa (1910–1937), singer and composer
- Paulinho da Viola (1942–), singer and composer
- Pixinguinha (1897–1973), composer
- Seu Jorge (1970–), singer and composer
- Zeca Pagodinho (1959–), singer and composer

== Choro ==
- Chiquinha Gonzaga (1847–1935), conductor and composer
- Ernesto Nazareth (1863–1934), composer
- Jacob do Bandolim (1918–1969), composer and musician
- Pixinguinha (1897–1973), composer and musician
- Waldir Azevedo (1923–1980), composer and musician

== Christian and gospel music ==
- Aline Barros, singer and composer
- Ana Nóbrega, singer and composer
- Ana Paula Valadão, singer and composer
- André Valadão, singer and composer
- Cassiane, singer and composer
- Cristina Mel, singer and composer
- Davi Sacer, singer and composer
- Diante do Trono, Christian music group
- Damares, singer and composer
- Deise Rosa, singer and composer
- Fernanda Brum, singer and composer
- Gabriela Rocha, singer and composer
- Hillsong Brasil, Christian music group
- Israel Salazar, singer and composer
- Juliano Son, singer and composer
- Livres para Adorar, Christian music group
- Lu Alone, singer and composer
- Ludmila Ferber, singer and composer
- Mariana Valadão, singer and composer
- Nívea Soares, singer and composer
- Oficina G3, Christian music group
- Rodolfo Abrantes, singer and composer
- Sarah Sheeva, singer and composer
- Soraya Moraes, singer and composer
- Trazendo a Arca, Christian music group

== Bossa nova ==
- Antônio Carlos Jobim (1927–1994), composer and pianist
- Astrud Gilberto (1940–2023), singer
- Baden Powell de Aquino (1937–2000), guitarist and composer
- Bebel Gilberto (born 1966), singer
- Celso Fonseca (born 1956), producer, singer, songwriter, guitarist
- Dolores Duran (1930–1959), singer and composer
- Carlos Lyra (1939–2023), composer
- Ithamara Koorax (born 1965), singer
- João Gilberto (1931–2019), guitarist, composer and singer
- Márcio Faraco (born 1963), expatriate, singer, guitarist, composer
- Maysa (1936–1977), singer and composer
- Nara Leão (1942–1989), singer
- Paulinho Nogueira (1929–2003), classical musician, guitarist, and composer
- Roberto Menescal (born 1937), singer
- Sérgio Mendes (1941-2024), pianist and arranger
- Toquinho (born 1946), guitarist, singer and composer
- Vinicius Cantuária (born 1951), singer, songwriter, guitarist
- Vinícius de Moraes (1913–1980), diplomat, poet, singer and composer
- Walter Wanderley (1932–1986), organist and arranger

== Forró ==
- Elba Ramalho (born 1951), singer
- Falamansa, forró and xote group
- Gonzaguinha (1945–1991), singer and composer
- Luiz Gonzaga (1912–1989), singer and composer
- Sivuca (1930–2006), accordionist

== Frevo ==
- Alceu Valença (born 1946), singer and composer
- Zé Ramalho (born 1949), singer and composer
- Elba Ramalho (born 1951), singer

== Mangue beat ==
- Chico Science (1966–1997), singer and composer
- Fred 04, singer and composer
- Nação Zumbi, musical group
- Otto, singer and composer

== Música popular brasileira, tropicalismo ==
- Adriana Calcanhotto (1965–), singer and composer
- Alice Caymmi (1990–), singer and composer
- Ana Carolina (1974–), singer and composer
- Angela Ro Ro (1949–2025), singer and composer
- Beto Guedes (1951–), singer, violinist and composer
- Bob Tostes, singer, composer and producer
- Caetano Veloso (1942–), singer and composer
- Cazuza (1958–1990), singer and composer
- Chico Buarque (1944–), singer and composer
- Chico César (1964–), singer and composer
- Damião Experiença (1935–2016), guitarist and harmonica player
- Djavan (1949–), singer and composer
- Dorival Caymmi (1914–2008), singer and composer
- Dudu Tucci (1955–), singer, composer and percussionist
- Ed Motta (1971–), funk/rock/electronic frontman, singer and composer
- Elis Regina (1945–1982), singer
- Elza Soares (1930–2022), singer and composer
- Flavio Rodrigues (1979–), singer, musician, composer and guitarist
- Gal Costa (1945–2022), singer
- Gilberto Gil (1942–), singer and composer
- Gonzaguinha (1945–1991), singer and composer
- Heraldo do Monte (1935–), guitarist, member of Quarteto Novo (Airto Moreira, Hermeto Pascoal, Theo de Barros)
- Ivan Lins (1945–), singer and composer
- Ivete Sangalo (1972–), singer, songwriter and composer
- Jair Oliveira (1975–), singer and composer
- Jorge Ben Jor (1942–), singer and composer
- Jorge Mautner (1941–), writer and singer
- Kátya Chamma (1961–), composer, singer, poet and writer
- Lenine (1959–), singer and composer
- Leoni (1961–), singer and composer
- Luciana Mello (1979–), singer and composer
- Luiz Melodia (1951–2017), singer and composer
- Marcelo Jeneci (1982–), singer and composer
- Marco Castillo (1963–), singer and composer
- Maria Bethânia (1946–), singer
- Maria Rita (1977–), singer
- Marina Elali (1982–), singer and composer
- Marina Lima (1955–), singer and composer
- Marisa Monte (1967–), singer and composer
- Maysa Matarazzo (1936–1977), singer
- Milton Nascimento (1942–), singer and composer
- Mônica da Silva, singer and composer
- Nelson Ned (1947–2014), singer
- Ney Matogrosso (1941–), singer
- Paula Lima (1970–), singer and composer
- Pepeu Gomes (1952–), composer
- Raul de Souza (1934–2021), trombonist
- Roberta Miranda (1956–), singer
- Roberto Carlos (1941–), singer and composer
- Silva (1969–), singer and composer
- Tim Maia (1942–1998), singer and composer
- Tom Zé (1936–), singer and composer
- Tulipa Ruiz (1978–), singer and composer
- Vanessa da Mata (1976–), singer and composer
- Zé Rodrix (1947–2009), guitarist, Som Imaginário, Sá, Rodrix & Guarabyra

== Sertanejo music ==
- Alex Ferrari (1982–), "Universitário" country singer
- Almir Sater (1956–), country singer and actor
- Bruno e Marrone, country music duo
- Chitãozinho and Xororó, country music duo
- Daniel (1968–)(formerly João Paulo e Daniel, before João Paulo's death), romantic country singer and composer
- Edu Gueda (1998–), "Universitário" country singer
- Fernando e Sorocaba, "Universitário" country duo
- Gusttavo Lima (1990–), "Universitário" country singer
- Inezita Barroso (1925–2015), folk music singer and scholar
- Jorge e Mateus (born 1982, born 1986), "Universitário" country duo
- Leandro and Leonardo (1961–1998, born 1963), country music duo
- Luan Santana (1991–), "Universitário" country singer and composer
- Michel Teló (1981–), "Universitário" country singer
- Paula Fernandes (1984–), modern country singer
- Sá & Guarabyra, folk music duo
- Sérgio Reis (1940–), classic country singer and composer
- Tião Carreiro & Pardinho, folk music duo and scholar
- Tonico & Tinoco (1917–1994, 1920–2012), folk music duo and scholar
- Victor e Leo (born 1975, born 1976), country music duo
- Wanessa (1982–), modern country singer
- Zezé di Camargo & Luciano, country music duo

== Jazz ==
- Dick Farney
- Luciana Souza
- Gustavo Assis-Brasil
- Victor Assis Brasil
- Paulinho da Costa
- Hélio Delmiro
- Egberto Gismonti
- Toninho Horta
- Romero Lubambo
- Cesar Camargo Mariano
- Airto Moreira
- Hermeto Pascoal
- Flora Purim
- Moacir Santos
- Sao Paulo Ska Jazz
- Naná Vasconcelos

== Brazilian rock ==
- Andre Matos (1971–2019), singer, pianist, keyboardist, composer
- Andreas Kisser (1968–), guitarist for the thrash metal band Sepultura
- Arnaldo Antunes (1960–), singer, composer, poet
- Cadão Volpato (1956–), singer-songwriter, frontman of Fellini
- Cássia Eller (1962–2001), singer
- Cello Dias, Against All Will bassist
- Celso Blues Boy (1956–2012), singer-songwriter and guitarist
- Chorão (1970–2013), Charlie Brown Jr. singer and frontman
- Ciro Pessoa (1957–2020), singer-songwriter, former Titãs and Cabine C member
- Edu Falaschi (1972–), Angra singer
- Erasmo Carlos (1941–2022), 70s rock singer and composer
- Felipe Andreoli (1980–), Angra bassist
- Fernanda Abreu (1961–), singer and composer
- Frank Jorge (1966–), bassist for Os Cascavelletes and Graforreia Xilarmônica
- Igor Cavalera (1970–), drummer for Cavalera Conspiracy
- Juli Manzi (1976–), singer and guitarist
- Jupiter Apple (1968–2015), Os Cascavelletes singer and frontman
- Herbert Vianna (1961–), Os Paralamas do Sucesso singer and frontman
- Humberto Gessinger (1963–), Engenheiros do Hawaii singer and frontman
- Kiko Loureiro (1972–), Angra guitarist
- Laufer, songwriter and guitarist
- Lobão (1957–), singer and composer
- Lulu Santos (1953–), singer and composer
- Marcelo Falcão (1973-), singer and composer for O Rappa
- Max Cavalera (1969–), singer, guitarist, Soulfly and Cavalera Conspiracy frontman
- Nasi (1962–), Ira! singer and frontman
- Nei Van Soria (1969–), guitarist for Os Cascavelletes
- Os Mutantes, influential Brazilian psychedelic rock band linked with the Tropicália movement of the late 1960s
- Pitty (1977–), rock singer and composer
- Rafael Bittencourt (1971–), Angra guitarist
- Raul Seixas (1945–1989), rock singer and composer
- Renato Russo (1960–1996), Legião Urbana singer and frontman
- Rita Lee (1947–2023), pop/rock singer and composer
- Robertinho de Recife (1965–), guitarist and composer
- Samuel Rosa (1966–), Skank singer and frontman
- Secos e Molhados (1971–), influential psychedelic glam rock band
- Thiago Modesto (1996–), Quimere singer and bassist
- Tony Babalu (1953– ), musician, songwriter and record producer.
- Ultraje a Rigor
- Vange Leonel (1963–2014), singer-songwriter, vocalist of Nau
- Vitor Assan (1996–), Quimere singer and guitarist

== Experimental music ==
- André Abujamra (born 1965), composer, singer and multi-instrumentalist, member of Os Mulheres Negras and Karnak
- Arrigo Barnabé (born 1951), composer and singer
- Damião Experiença (1935–2016), composer, singer and multi-instrumentalist
- Denis Mandarino (born 1964), composer and singer
- Itamar Assumpção (1949–2003), composer and singer
- Jorge Antunes (born 1942), composer
- Lívio Tragtenberg (born 1961), composer and multi-instrumentalist
- Rogério Skylab (born 1956), composer and singer

== Pop music ==
- Anitta, pop singer
- Balão Mágico, children's songs
- Br'oZ, boyband
- Carmen Monarcha (born 1979), opera singer
- Carrapicho, pop group
- Deborah Blando (born 1969), pop singer
- Felipe Dylon (born 1987), pop singer
- Gretchen (born 1959)
- Kasino, a band
- Kelly Key (born 1983), pop singer
- KLB, pop group/boyband
- Lucinha Turnbull (born 1953), singer, guitarist
- Luiza Possi (born 1984), MPB singer
- Lulu Santos (born 1953), pop singer
- Pabllo Vittar, drag queen and pop singer
- Rouge, pop girlband
- Sandy & Junior, pop singers/pop duo
- Sandy (born 1983), pop singer
- Trem da Alegria, children's songs
- Virginie Boutaud (born 1963), singer, vocalist of Metrô
- Xuxa (born 1963), singer

== Electronica ==
- Amon Tobin, producer and DJ
- Alok, producer and DJ
- Chris Leão, DJ
- DJ Marky, DJ
- DJ Patife, DJ
- DJ Dolores, artist and DJ
- FTampa, artist, producer and DJ
- XRS Land, producer and DJ
- Gui Boratto, producer, composer
- DJ Marlboro, producer, composer, and DJ
- Drumagick, producer, Composer
- Vintage Culture, producer and DJ
- Bruno Furlan, producer and DJ

== Brazilian hip hop ==
- MV Bill (born 1974), rapper
- Sonia Destre Lie, choreographer
- Emicida (born 1985), rapper
- Fausto Fawcett (born 1957), rapper and writer
- Marcelo D2 (born 1967), rapper
- Mr. Thug (born 1990), singer
- Negra Li (born 1979), singer
- Gabriel o Pensador, rapper
- Pollo, rappers group
- Racionais MC's, rappers group
- Bonde da Stronda, rappers group
- Sabotage (1973–2003), rapper

== Axé music ==
- Cláudia Leitte, axé singer
- Margareth Menezes, axé singer
- Daniela Mercury
- Ivete Sangalo, axé/pop singer

== Funk carioca ==
- Tati Quebra Barraco, singer
- DJ Marlboro, MC and DJ
- MC Sapão, singer-songwriter
- Mr. Catra, singer-songwriter
- Pocah, singer-songwriter
- Tati Zaqui, singer-songwriter

== Soundtrack ==
- Marcos Valle, musician and producer
