= Mais Uma Vez =

1986 song by 14 Bis

Single by 14 Bis and Renato Russo

from the album Sete and Presente
- Released: March 1987
- Recorded: 1986
- Genre: MPB; pop rock
- Length: 5:05
- Label: EMI-Odeon
- Songwriter(s): Flávio Venturini; Renato Russo
- Producer(s): Mayrton Bahia

14 Bis and Renato Russo singles chronology
"Tempo Perdido" (1986)	"Mais Uma Vez" (1987)	"Quase Sem Querer" (1986)

"Mais Uma Vez" is a song composed and sung by Brazilian musicians Renato Russo and Flávio Venturini in 1986. It was released as the first single of Sete, a 1987 album by Venturini's band 14 Bis.

== Background and writing ==
In 1986, Flávio Venturini was getting to know Renato Russo at EMI-Odeon studios in Rio de Janeiro, when 14 Bis and Legião Urbana were in rooms close to each other recording their next albums (respectively, Sete and Dois). Venturini, who had arrived earlier than his bandmates, was practicing a new song for the album when Russo entered the room and asked to write the song's lyrics. Russo proposed lyrics about a father telling his son that the Sun would shine after a storm. Venturini liked the idea and sent him a tape with the song's music, under Russo's promise of sending him the lyrics. Due to Russo's commitment with Dois, he could not send the lyrics until three months after their meeting. Russo did some slight melody modifications, following some improvisations. The song was composed in B-flat major and possessed an andante tempo. In the 14 Bis version, Venturini sang falsettos in the chorus, while Russo sang the remaining verses with a natural voice; on the clip version, however, Venturini sang the entire song alone. On Russo's solo version, he sang alone.

Venturini invited Russo to join the song recording with 14 Bis, which resulted in Sete's final version. According to one source, Venturini sang the entire song, after which Russo sang the entire song. They then picked their favourite parts from producer Mayrton Bahia's final edited version. Russo, however, said that he could not explain the melody to the group. Instead, he recorded guide vocals that the band later decided to use in the final version.

== Structure and Lyrics ==
The song was composed in B-flat major and possesses an andante tempo. In the 14 Bis version, Venturini sings falsettos and the chorus, while Russo sings the remaining verses with a natural voice. On the clip version, however, Venturini sings the entire song alone. On Russo's solo version, he sings alone.

The lyrics feature several motivational sentences like "espera que o sol já vem" ("wait because the sun is about to come"), "nunca deixe que lhe digam que não vale a pena acreditar no sonho que se tem" ("never let people tell you it's not worth it to believe in your dreams"), and "se você quiser alguém em quem confiar, confie em si mesmo" ("if you want someone to trust, trust yourself"). Russo said he believes in what he wrote and that he says similar things on Legião Urbana's lyrics, but in a different way.

== Personnel ==
- Renato Russo – co-lead vocals
- Flávio Venturini — co-lead vocals and keyboards
- Cláudio Venturini — vocals and guitar
- Sérgio Magrão – vocals and bass
- Vermelho – vocals and keyboards
- Hely Rodrigues – drums

== Renato Russo version ==
"Mais Uma Vez"

Single by Renato Russo

from the album Presente
- Language: Portuguese
- English title: Once Again
- Released: 14 March 2003
- Recorded: 1986
- Genre: Acoustic rock, pop rock
- Length: 3:58
- Label: EMI-Odeon
- Songwriter(s): Flávio Venturini, Renato Russo
- Producer(s): Nilo Romero

Between 2001 and 2002, researcher Marcelo Fróes undertook a search in Russo's archives for high-quality music recordings to release. When he and Nilo Romero were almost ready to simply remix 14 Bis's version with Russo for inclusion on the album Presente, they found the tape containing a vocal track with Russo singing alone. Thus, Romero decided to produce a new recording over the vocal track, updating the song. The tape had been stored in EMI's archives for over 15 years. Both the new and the original versions were included on the album.

The track was featured on the soundtrack of the telenovela Mulheres Apaixonadas by Rede Globo.

=== Renato Russo personnel ===
- Renato Russo – lead vocals
- Billy Brandão – guitars
- Paulinho Moska — nylon guitar and twelve-string guitar
- Nilo Romero – bass and steel guitar
- Sacha Amback – keyboards
- Jongui – drums

=== Charts ===
Weekly chart performance for "Ragatanga"
Chart (2003)	Peak position
Brazil (Brasil Hot 100 Airplay)	1
