= Presente (Renato Russo album) =

Studio album by Renato Russo
- Released: March 27, 2003
- Genre: Rock, pop, acoustic rock
- Length: 64:09
- Language: Portuguese, English
- Label: EMI

Renato Russo chronology
O Último Solo (1997)	Presente (2003)	O Trovador Solitário (2008)

Singles from Presente
- 1. "Mais Uma Vez" Released: 14 March 2003

Presente (English: Gift) is the fourth and last solo album by Brazilian singer-songwriter Renato Russo, and his second posthumous one, released in March 2003, seven years after his death.

== Background ==
Journalist and producer Marcelo Fróes searched Russo's personal archives and EMI's collection to find material that could be used for a release. From this search emerged some rarities that could be released.

The project was similar to an idea presented to the label by Reginaldo Ferreira, a former roadie of Russo's main band Legião Urbana and his personal friend, to Jorge Davidson (the label's artistic manager), but rejected. Davidson ended up planning the album alone, without consulting Fróes. The journalist then demanded to be credited as the project's conceiver and executive producer, and to decide the order of the songs. Davidson accepted and was credited as artistic manager on "Mais Uma Vez", "Hoje" and "Boomerang Blues".

== Repertoire and curation ==
Fróes found some of the songs on Russo's homemade recordings, including "Hoje" (a duet with Leila Pinheiro), "Boomerang Blues" (written by him and recorded by Barão Vermelho) and "Thunder Road" (a cover of the Bruce Springsteen song).

Previously released songs were also included, such as "A Cruz e a Espada" (duet with Paulo Ricardo, ex-RPM), "A Carta" (duet with Erasmo Carlos), "Quando Eu Estiver Cantando" (a Cazuza cover originally recorded live for Viva Cazuza, a special show that took place in October 1990, three months after his death and that continues into a cover of "Endless Love") and "Gente Humilde" (duet with acoustic guitarist Hélio Delmiro, recorded for 1993's Songbook Vinícius de Moraes vol. 3, a project celebrating Vinicius de Moraes' 90th birthday prepared by Almir Chediak). "A Cruz e a Espada" was later released as a duet on Ricardo's 1996 solo album Rock Popular Brasileiro.

"Cathedral Song / Catedral" is a mix of "Cathedral Song" (a cover of the Tanita Tikaram song) and "Catedral" (another version, but sung in Portuguese by Zélia Duncan). The idea came from Victor Kelly, from EMI's marketing department.

"Mais Uma Vez", written by Russo and Flávio Venturini and recorded by 14 Bis (of which Venturini was a member) in 1987, was chosen as the key track from the album. A new version of the song was created, using only Russo's voice. It became the album's main single and was featured on the soundtrack of the telenovela Mulheres Apaixonadas, aired by Rede Globo in 2003. The original version was remixed and included on the album.

"Hoje" was shelved for many years. Leila Pinheiro was a Legião Urbana fan and included "Tempo Perdido" in her repertoire. She had visited Russo in Ilha do Governador to ask for permission to record the track on her third album, Alma (1988), and they became friends.

Later, when Russo was already aware of his HIV-positive condition, he showed Pinheiro the lyrics to "Hoje" and asked her to play it on the piano in a bossa nova style. The lyrics expressed a wish for more time, although Pinheiro was not aware of Russo's condition at the time. She did not have access to the tape Russo recorded until Fróes recovered it and producer Nilo Romero invited her to sing the final version.

"Boomerang Blues" was composed during Russo's "O Trovador Solitário" (The Lonely Troubador) era. The version featured on this album was a new arrangement that kept Russo's voice and acoustic guitar and added a dobro and a harmonica by producer Nilo Romero. In 2017, it was featured in another Globo telenovela, this time as the opening theme of O Outro Lado do Paraíso. Barão Vermelho covered it for their album Declare Guerra.

Presente still had some gaps by the end of the agreed production period – December 2002 to February 2003 – because the label could not negotiate with all the relevant parties in time. Some of the missing parts (namely duets with Dorival Caymmi and Adriana Calcanhotto) ended up used in a future Renato Russo solo release, Duetos. To fill in these gaps, some interviews Russo had given to José Maurício Machline, from International Magazine, were used.

=== Title ===
The album's title was proposed by lawyer Silvia Gandelman, since it would be released on Russo's birthday.

== Track list ==
Presente tracks
No.	Title	Writer(s)	English title	Length
1.	"Mais uma Vez"	Flávio Venturini / Renato Russo	Once Again	3:58
2.	"Hoje" (featuring Leila Pinheiro)	Renato Russo / Leila Pinheiro	Today	4:14
3.	"Boomerang Blues"	Renato Russo		3:29
4.	"Cathedral Song / Catedral" (featuring Zélia Duncan)	Tanita Tikaram; Version: Christiaan Oyens, Zélia Duncan		2:55
5.	"A Cruz e a Espada" (featuring Paulo Ricardo)	Luiz Schiavon, Paulo Ricardo	The Cross and the Sword	3:10
6.	"A Carta" (featuring Erasmo Carlos)	Benil Santos, Raul Sampaio	The Letter	4:08
7.	"Gente Humilde" (featuring Hélio Delmiro)	Chico Buarque, Garoto, Vinicius de Moraes	Humble People	3:37
8.	"Thunder Road"	Bruce Springsteen		3:34
9.	"Quando Eu Estiver Cantando / Endless Love" (live)	João Rebouças, Cazuza / Lionel Richie	When I Am Singing	4:23
10.	"Entrevista 1" (Parts of an interview given on 1 December 1994)		Interview 1	10:07
11.	"Entrevista 2" (Parts of an interview given on 20 September 1995)		Interview 2	8:36
12.	"Entrevista 3" (Parts of an interview given on 6 July 1996)		Interview 3	7:27
13.	"Mais uma Vez" (14 Bis)	Flávio Venturini, Renato Russo	Once Again; original version	4:31
Total length:				64:09

== Personnel ==
According to Fuscaldo 2016, pp. 189–190.

- Renato Russo – vocals on all tracks, acoustic guitar on "Bomerang Blues", "Thunder Road"
- Moska – twelve-string guitar on "Mais Uma Vez"
- Billy Brandão – guitar on "Mais Uma Vez"
- Nilo Romero – dobro and harmonica on "Boomerang Blues", bass guitar and steel acoustic guitar on "Mais Uma Vez"
- Sacha Amback – keyboards on "Mais Uma Vez"
- Jongui – drums on "Mais Uma Vez"

=== Technical personnel ===
- Marcelo Fróes – conceiver and executive producer
- Jorge Davidson – artistic manager on "Mais Uma Vez", "Hoje" and "Boomerang Blues"
- Nilo Romero – producer on "Mais Uma Vez", "Hoje" and "Boomerang Blues"
- Gabriela Azevedo – Romero's assistant on "Mais Uma Vez", "Hoje" and "Boomerang Blues"
- Loup De Ville (Note: According to Fuscaldo 2016, p. 192., "Loup De Ville" means "city wolf" in French. Since the track was edited at RockIt! studios, which belonged to Dado Villa-Lobos (Russo's Legião Urbana band mate), since French is a spoken language in Belgium (Villa-Lobo's country of birth) and since by the time Presente was being prepared Russo's family and the surviving Legião Urbana members wouldn't get along well, it is believed that the operator is Villa-Lobos himself, omitting his name on purpose) – Pro Tools operator on "Cathedral Song / Catedral"
