= English Brazilians =

Ethnic group in Brazil

English Brazilians Anglo-brasileiros
- (England) (Brazil)

Total population
- 23,914 British citizens

Languages
- Portuguese, English

Religion
- Protestantism · Roman Catholicism

Related ethnic groups
- Other White Brazilians

English Brazilians (Portuguese: Anglo-brasileiros) are Brazilians of full, partial or predominantly English ancestry or English-born people residing in Brazil.

== History ==
Colonial-era economic influences and the Anglo-Portuguese Alliance led to the settlement of English merchants and others in Brazil. After Brazilian independence, Britain was Brazil's main commercial partner; Britain financed part of the Brazil's industrialization, building railroads, including the São Paulo Railway (SPR).

In the 1920 Republican Census, there were 9,637 "Englishmen" in Brazil (probably, all British citizens were counted as "Englishmen"). The states with the majority of English origin were:

1. São Paulo (2,198),
2. Federal District - which was the Rio de Janeiro city - (2,057),
3. Minas Gerais (1,709), and
4. Pernambuco (1,123).

Brazilian cities settled by the English during the same period, include:

1. Rio de Janeiro city (2,057),
2. São Paulo (1,212),
3. Recife (980),
4. Santos (555), and
5. Niterói (459).

== Cultural influence ==
One of their major contributions at the cultural level was the establishment of several football clubs, including São Paulo Athletic Club and Fluminense Football Club.

== Notable English Brazilians ==
- James Norton – Commander of the Brazilian Navy
- João Frederico Caldwell – Marshal of the Brazilian Army
- Ronnie Biggs
- Alice Dayrell Caldeira Brant
- Bianca Byington
- Oscar Cox
- Taio Cruz
- Rodrigo C. de Lamare - engineer
- Alfie Enoch
- John Pascoe Grenfell – Admiral of the Brazilian Navy
- Tarsis Humphreys
- Berta Lutz
- Charles William Miller
- Helena Morley
- Gérard Moss
- Ellen Gracie Northfleet
- Eric Maleson – Olympic bobsled athlete
- Marta Suplicy
- Alice Dellal – Model, photographer
- Supla
- Tim Vickery
- Harry Welfare
- José Roberto Wright
- Andrucha Waddington
- Kaya Scodelario
- Mia Goth
- Ritchie

== See also ==
- Brazil–United Kingdom relations
- Brazilian Britons
- Immigration to Brazil
- White Brazilians
- English people
- English diaspora

== Sources ==
- Freyre, G. (2011). The English in Brazil: Aspects of British Influence on the Life, Landscape and Culture of Brazil. Boulevard. ISBN 978-1-899460-61-8.
