= Bob Tostes =

- Born: Brazil
- Genres: Bossa Nova
- Occupations: Singer, composer, producer
- Instrument: Vocals
- Labels: Albatroz, Dabliú

Bob Tostes is a singer, composer and producer of Rádio Guarani FM, Belo Horizonte, Minas Gerais, Brazil. In 1969 he was the leader of a local group of the Musicanossa movement, which was set up in Rio de Janeiro by composer Roberto Menescal. In the same year he was a final contestant of the local phase of the IV Festival Internacional da Canção, with the tunes "Caminhada" (in partnership with Roberto Guimarães) and "Noite mais linda" (in partnership with Bebeth Farah). In the 70s he directed and produced FEC - Festival Estudantil da Canção (Students’ Music Festival) which counted with the participation of the novices Lô Borges, Beto Guedes, Flávio Venturini, Toninho Horta, Túlio Mourão, Tavinho Moura and Ivan Lins. The festival unveiled the song Clube da Esquina. Bob Tostes graduated in Law from UFMG - the local state-owned university in 1971 and registered for the Communication Course at [Pontifícia Universidade Católica de Minas Gerais]. In the 70s he composed soundtracks for children plays put up by the "Teatro de Equipe" including "O Cavalinho Azul" by Maria Clara Machado and "Casaco Encantado", which was directed by Priscila Freire. He also wrote for musical columns in newspapers, Diário da Tarde and Diário do Comércio in 1960, 1970 and 1980. In the 90s he published essays in the "Pensar" section of the major newspaper Estado de Minas.

Bob Tostes was a producer of Rádio Inconfidência FM in the opening of "Brasileiríssima" program in 1979 e 1980. He returned to the broadcasting company in 1996 for the production of daily shows about cinema and Música popular brasileira, place where he remained up to 1998. In 1999 he went on to work for Rádio Guarani FM to participate in the program improvement and in special productions. Ever since 1996 he has conducted the children’s choir of Escola Santo Tomás de Aquino in Belo Horizonte.

He has sung along in shows with Suzana Tostes, Juarez Moreira, Renato Motha, Patrícia Lobato, Délio Cardoso, Marilton Borges, Roberto Menescal, Antonio Adolfo, Nara Leão, Célio Balona, Jane Duboc, Talita Babl, Patty Asher, Titi Walter, Roberto Guimarães, Pacífico Mascarenhas, Christiano Caldas, Pingo Ballona, Milton Ramos and Cléber Alves, among others.

In 2002 he released the CD "Sessão Dupla - Novas Bossas" with Suzana Tostes featuring special guests. In 2006 he was invited by Roberto Menescal to record the CD "Sinatra in Bossa" to be released on the Japanese market.

== Discography ==
- 2007:"Sinatra in bossa/Call me irresponsible"—Bob Tostes with Roberto Menescal (Japan: LD&K)
- 2006:"Sinatra in bossa/Call me irresponsible" -Bob Tostes with Roberto Menescal (Albatroz/Brazil)
- 2003:"Sambacana: volume 3", re-release (Japan: EMI)
- 2003:"Sessão dupla: Novas bossas", with Suzana Tostes (Portugal)
- 2002:"Sessão dupla: Novas bossas", with Suzana Tostes, Renato Motha, Roberto Menescal, Juarez Moreira and Jane Duboc. (São Paulo: Dabliú)
- 1980:"Aleluia, Bossa Nova" recorded live at "Baubles" in 1978 and featuring special guests- Rio de Janeiro/Label: Imagem/ Independent)
- 1976:"Sambacana: volume 4", with Suzana Tostes, Wagner Tiso, Nivaldo Ornelas and Toninho Horta performing songs by Pacífico Mascarenhas (Rio de Janeiro: Tapecar)

=== Other recordings - special participation ===
- 2008: "Bem-vindo ao Rio", by Pacífico Mascarenhas (Independent)
- 2008: "Relaxing Bossa Lounge"
- 2007: "Candle Light Christmas"
- 2007: "Stevie in Bossa"
- 2007: "Carpenters in Bossa"
- 2006: "Sad in Bossa", various singers (Japan: Albatroz)
- 2006: "Christmas in bossa", various singers (Japan: LD&K Records)
- 2006: "Sinatra in Bossa Nova", various singers (Japan:LD&K Records)
- 2006: "Ipanema Sessions", various singers (Japan: Ward Records)
- 2005: "Southern Breezin´ Bossa", various singers (Japan, Ward Records)
- 2005: "Guinness", by Pacífico Mascarenhas.
- 2005: "Açaí", various singers (Japão: Ward Records)
- 2004: "Dois em pessoa", with Renato Motha and Patrícia Lobato (Independent)
- 2003: "Bossa Nova e Canções", various singers (Dabliú/Trama)
- 2003: "Amor Certinho", by Roberto Guimarães (Independent)
- 1998: "Amarelo", Renato Motha & Patrícia Lobato (Independent)
- 1997: "Belo Horizonte que eu gosto", Pacífico Mascarenhas (Independent)
- 1995: "Canções de Natal", Talita Babl (Independent)
- 1994: "Bateia", various singers (Independent)
- 1993: "Nuvens Douradas", Juarez Moreira (Empowerment)
- 1991: "Bossa Nova Wonderland", with Roberto Menescal, Johnny Alf, Rosa Passos and Carlos Lyra (Japan: Meldec)
