= Joelho de Porco =

Brazilian rock band from São Paulo

- Origin: São Paulo, São Paulo, Brazil
- Genres: Rock and roll, punk rock, psychedelic rock, hard rock, comedy rock, proto-punk
- Years active: 1972–1977, 1983–1998, 2008–2012
- Labels: Som Livre, Beverly, Movieplay
- Past members: Billy Bond; Próspero Albanesse; Tico Terpins; Zé Rodrix; Guilherme Arantes; Fabio Gasparini; Gerson Tatini; David Drew Zingg; Dudy Guper; Sérgio Sá; Flavio Pimenta; Walter Baillot; Ayres Braga; André Geraissati; Albino Infantozzi; Pedro Infantozzi; João Paulo de Almeida; Conrado Ruiz

Joelho de Porco (lit. "Pig's Knee" but more precisely "Ham hock") is a Brazilian rock band formed in 1972 in São Paulo. They are known for their musical eclecticism and their role in pioneering punk in Brazil.

== History ==
=== Context and formation ===
In 1965 the group The Skeletons was formed in São Paulo. Later, they changed their name to Os Abrasivos. Their line-up involved Fábio Gasparini and Eduardo Zocchi on the guitars and Próspero Albanese on the drums. They initially had no bassist and performed instrumental rock. Later, bassist Gerson Tatini (who would later play with Moto Perpétuo) joined them.

Still in the 1960s, the band Mona is formed with Albanese, Gasparini and Tatini among its members. Other members included guitarist André Geraissati, brothers Albino and Pedro Infantozzi, João Paulo de Almeida and Conrado Ruiz.

In 1966 João Paulo de Almeida invited some of his former Mona mates for a show at a music festival at Rio Branco School in which he would perform a song of his. The performed under a line-up that included Almeida (keyboards, vocals), Fabio Gasparini (guitar), Gerson Tatini (bass), Prospero Albanese (drums) and Celso (accordion). The name "Joelho de Porco" was suggested by Gasparini, who had had some Eisbein (known as "joelho de porco") in Brazil in a German restaurant and jokingly suggested they adopted the name, which was ultimately accepted.

In 1972 they established their classic line-up of Tico Terpins (acoustic guitar, vocals, rhythm guitar; formerly of Os Baobás), Próspero Albanese (drums and vocals), Gerson Tatini (guitarist-turned-bassist), Rodolfo Ayres Braga (bass and vocals; formerly of Terreno Baldio and The Jet Blacks), Walter Baillot (lead guitar; formerly of Provos e Século XX; replaced Gerson Tatini following an invitation by Rodolfo Ayres Braga), Conrado Ruiz (guitar, piano and vocals; formerly of Mona) and Flavio Pimenta (drums and percussion).

=== First single and São Paulo 1554/Hoje ===
With this line-up, they recorded in 1973 the single "Se Você Vai de Xaxado, Eu Vou de Rock And Roll/Fly America", produced by ex-Mutantes members Arnaldo Baptista, who also performed minimoog on the song.

Three years later, they released their first album São Paulo 1554/Hoje. Still lacking a decent amount of money, they rented Rogério Duprat's Vice-Versa studio in São Paulo, at night, when it was cheaper.

=== Arrival of Billy Bond and self-titled album ===
In 1976 vocalist Albanese left the band to pursue a career in law and was briefly replaced with Ricardo Petraglia, who only performed in a handful of shows. He was soon replaced with Italian-Argentine singer Billy Bond, who had led hard rock band Billy Bond y La Pesada del Rock and Roll and had produced artists such as Sui Generis, Pappo's Blues and Ney Matogrosso.

In 1978 they recorded a self-titled album via Som Livre, which was promoted by Rede Globo. but they disbanded soon after.

=== Return in the 1980s ===
In 1983 Terpins, alongside Próspero Albanese and Zé Rodrix (ex-Sá, Rodrix and Guarabyra), reformed the band and recorded the double album Saqueando a Cidade, containing a rock version of "Funiculi, Funiculá".

With singer and photographer David Drew Zingg, the band participated in the Festival dos Festivais of TV Globo, in 1985, with the song "A Última Voz do Brasil", qualifying for the finals and winning first prize in the lyrics category.

In 1988 they released the album 18 Anos Sem Sucesso, covering American pre-rock pop music.

=== End of the group ===
The group was semi-active until 1998, when Terpins died following a heart attack. In 2000, Drew also died due to multiple organ failure. In 2009, Rodrix died in São Paulo at 61.

== Discography ==
=== Studio albums ===
- São Paulo 1554/Hoje (1976)
- Joelho de Porco (1978)
- Saqueando a Cidade (1983)
- 18 Anos Sem Sucesso (1988)

=== Singles ===
- "Se Você Vai de Xaxado, Eu Vou de Rock'n'Roll"/"Fly America" (1973)
- "La lampara de Edison"/"Ruiseñor brasilero"/"Mexico lindo"/"Boeing 723897" (1977)
- "Outra Volta"/"O Rapé" (1978)
- "O Rapé"/"Feijão Com Arroz" (1978)
- "Supermen"/"Otravolta" (1979)

=== Other recordings ===
- A Última Voz do Brasil, for the Festival dos Festivais album (1985)
- Подарок (O Presente), for the album Бразилия – Страна Всех Красок (Brasil – País de Todas as Cores) – CBS (catalogue nomber 620116) (1986)
