= Celso Blues Boy =

Brazilian singer-songwriter and guitarist (1956–2012)

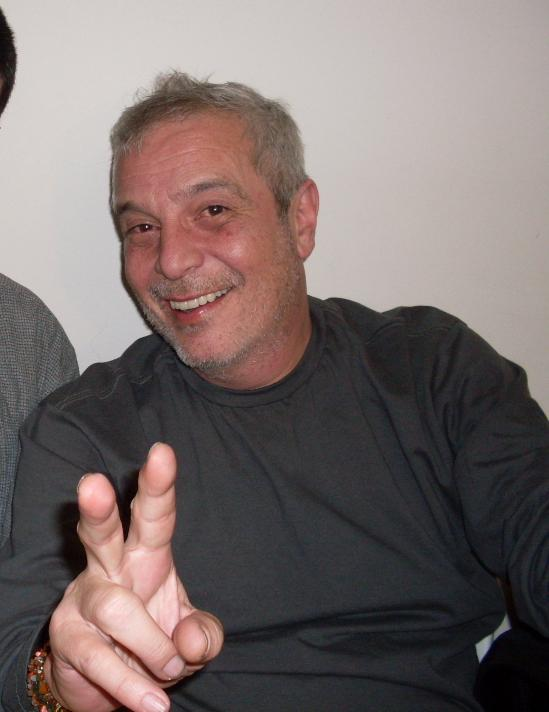
- Blues Boy in 2010

Background information
- Born: Celso Ricardo Furtado de Carvalho; January 5, 1956; Blumenau, Santa Catarina, Brazil
- Died: August 6, 2012 (aged 56) Joinville, Santa Catarina, Brazil
- Genres: Blues rock, rock and roll
- Occupations: Singer-songwriter, guitarist
- Instruments: Vocals, electric guitar
- Years active: 1970–2012
- Formerly of: Raul Seixas, Crackerjackband, Sá & Guarabyra, Luiz Melodia, Legião Estrangeira, Aero Blues, B.B. King

Celso Ricardo Furtado de Carvalho (January 5, 1956 – August 6, 2012), better known by his stage name Celso Blues Boy, was a Brazilian singer-songwriter and guitarist.

== Biography ==
Carvalho was born in Rio de Janeiro in 1956. His stage name, "Blues Boy", is a homage to American singer B.B. King, one of his idols and major influences. (Celso would play alongside King in 1986, at a gig in Rio.) He began his musical career in 1970, when only 17 years old, accompanying bands and singers such as Raul Seixas, Sá & Guarabyra and Luiz Melodia. In 1976 he formed the band Legião Estrangeira, and started to perform in some bars and clubhouses of Rio.

In 1980 he formed the band Aero Blues, considered to be one of the first Brazilian blues rock bands to sing in the Portuguese language; however, he decided to follow with a solo career later on, and released his debut album, Som na Guitarra, in 1984. It is notable for containing his most well-known song, "Aumenta que Isso Aí É Rock 'n' Roll". More albums would come afterwards, as well as performances at the prestigious Montreux Jazz Festival in Switzerland and at the Circo Voador in Rio.

2011 saw the release of his ninth (and ultimately last) studio album, Por um Monte de Cerveja, which counted with the special participation of the members of Detonautas Roque Clube.

Blues Boy was living in Joinville, Santa Catarina, towards the end of his life; an inveterate smoker, he died on August 6, 2012, due to laryngeal cancer. He was cremated and his ashes were buried in Blumenau.

Blues Boy was a die-hard fan of the soccer club Vasco da Gama. In a show promoting the club's 113th anniversary in 2011, he played the club's anthem on his guitar.

== Discography ==
(Singles)

- 1983: E Eu Disse Adeus & Caminhando
- 1984: Fugindo de Mim & Sinto Tanta Vontade

(Albums)

- 1984: Som na Guitarra
- 1986: Marginal Blues
- 1987: Celso Blues Boy 3
- 1988: Blues Forever
- 1989: Quando a Noite Cai
- 1991: Ao Vivo (live album)
- 1996: Indiana Blues
- 1998: Nuvens Negras Choram
- 1999: Vagabundo Errante
- 2008: Quem Foi que Falou que Acabou o Rock n' Roll? (live DVD)
- 2011: Por um Monte de Cerveja
- 2015: Acústico
- 2020: Quando um Bluseiro se Vai
