= Entre a Fé e a Razão =

Studio album by Trazendo a Arca
- Released: 2010
- Genre: Christian Rock; Contemporary Christian music
- Label: Graça Music

Trazendo a Arca chronology
Salmos e Cânticos Espirituais (2009)	Entre a Fé e a Razão (2010)	Live in Orlando (2011)

Entre a Fé e a Razão is the four studio album by Trazendo a Arca, and the first released by Graça Music. This album had 40 000 copies sold.

== Track listing ==
1. "Sobre a Terra"
2. "Acende a Chama"
3. "Grande Deus"
4. "Nosso Deus"
5. "Entre a Fé e a Razão"
6. "Desceu"
7. "Casa do Oleiro"
8. "O Nardo"
9. "Vale a Pena"
10. "Quando a Nuvem Move"
11. "Sal e Luz"

== Personnel ==
- Luiz Arcanjo (lead vocals)
- André Mattos (drums)
- Ronald Fonseca (keyboard)
- Deco Rodrigues (bass)
- Isaac Ramos (guitar)
