= Oscar Cox =

Brazilian football club founder (1880–1931)

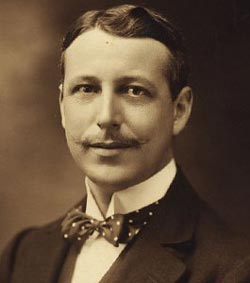
- Born: Oscar Alfredo Sebastião Cox; 20 January 1880; Rio de Janeiro, Brazil
- Died: 6 October 1931 (aged 51); Clermont-Ferrand, France
- Resting place: São João Batista Cemetery, Rio de Janeiro, Brazil
- Known for: Pioneering football in Brazil and founding Fluminense
- Title: President of Fluminense
- Term: 1902 – 1903
- Successor: Francis Walter

Oscar Alfredo Sebastião Cox (20 January 1880 – 6 October 1931) was an English-Brazilian sportsman who introduced football to the city of Rio de Janeiro and founded Fluminense, one of Brazil's most traditional and popular football clubs.

== Biography ==
Born to a wealthy family of English Brazilian heritage, his father was an English diplomat working in South America. Oscar did his studies in Lausanne, where he got acquainted with the practice of football. Upon returning from Switzerland, Oscar tried to disseminate this activity in the city of Rio de Janeiro. On 22 September 1901, Oscar was able to organize the first football match in the history of the state of Rio de Janeiro. He then proceeded to São Paulo, with some friends, to play against a group led by Charles Miller, who had started the process of disseminating football in São Paulo back in 1894. The groups played two times against each other, and both matches ended in a draw.

On 21 July 1902, Oscar, aged 22, founded Fluminense. Fluminense remains as one of the most popular and traditional sports institutions still in existence in the history of Brazilian football.

After his death in France his remains were transferred to Rio de Janeiro.

== See also ==
- Henry Welfare
