= Live in Orlando (Trazendo a Arca album) =

Video by Trazendo a Arca
- Released: December 2011 (Brazil)
- Recorded: July 30, 2011; In the First Baptist Church in Orlando, Florida
- Genre: Christian Rock; Contemporary Christian music
- Length: 111:28
- Label: Graça Music
- Director: N Filmes
- Producer: Ronald Fonseca

Trazendo a Arca chronology
Entre a Fé e a Razão (2010)	Live in Orlando (2011)

Live in Orlando (in Portuguese: Ao Vivo em Orlando) is the second video album by Trazendo a Arca. It was recorded in Orlando, USA in 2011.

== Track listing ==
1. "Santo" (Holy, Holy, Holy)
2. "Introdução, instrumental" (Introduction, instrumental)
3. "Yeshua"
4. "Sobre a Terra" (About the Earth)
5. "Grande Deus" (Great God)
6. "Invoca-me" (Call on Me)
7. "Serás Sempre Deus" (You will be always God)
8. "Nosso Deus é Santo" (Our God is Holy)
9. "Em Ti Esperarei" (In God I will wait)
10. "Por que Te Abates" (Why grieves)
11. "Cruz" (Cross)
12. "Pra Tocar no Manto" (To Touch the mantle)
13. "Entre a Fé e a Razão" (Between Faith and Reason)
14. "O Nardo" (The Nardo)
15. "Casa do Oleiro" (The potter's house)
16. "Reina o Senhor" (The Lord reigneth)

== Personnel ==
- Luiz Arcanjo (lead vocals, guitar)
- André Mattos (drums)
- Ronald Fonseca (keyboard, piano, produce)
- Deco Rodrigues (bass)
- Isaac Ramos (electric guitar)
