= Eduardo e Mônica =

Single by Legião Urbana

from the album Dois
- Released: 1986
- Recorded: 1986
- Genre: Folk rock; art rock
- Length: 4:31
- Label: EMI-Odeon
- Songwriters: Dado Villa-Lobos, Renato Russo, Marcelo Bonfá
- Producer: Mayrton Bahia

Legião Urbana singles chronology
"Tempo Perdido" (1986)	"Eduardo e Mônica" (1986)	"Quase Sem Querer" (1986)

"Eduardo e Mônica" (Eduardo and Monica) is a song from Brazilian rock band Legião Urbana's 1986 album Dois, released as promo single. It tells a romantic story centered on a couple formed by the 16-year-old Eduardo and the older college student Mônica, who are very different from each other.

The title characters are inspired by songwriter and vocalist Renato Russo's friend Leonice de Araújo Coimbra and her husband Fernando Coimbra, although he also once said Eduardo is based on him himself, though "less of a fool".

== Writing and theme ==
[...] highly strong and immediate hit single. Ideal opening track to side 2, if not for the difficulties demonstrated by the remaining material in terms of the order of presentation. It doesn't impress much in the only position found until now, track 4, side 1, followed by "Tempo perdido" [...].

— Renato Russo, on a letter sent to EMI with album notes

The song had already been recorded in 1982, when Russo performed alone with his acoustic guitar under the moniker "O Trovador Solitário" (The Solitary Troubadour), on a cassette tape that would be later recovered and released along with other songs on his posthumous solo album O Trovador Solitário.

This version has a different ending than the one from the album. In the latter, it is stated that in a certain vacation period, the family could not travel because the son was retaking a class in school. (Note: "Recuperação" is a method of school grade recovering common in Brazilian schools. Should a student fail a particular subject, they have a chance of raising it to approval level by taking some extra classes and doing more tests. It is somehow similar to Summer schools in the United States. It's also not unlike the practice of taking remedial tests in north American colleges.) In the original version, the couple's son is still yet to be born and that they didn't get married in a church, but at Eduardo's ranch. Some verses were already scratched by then: "With an Indian flutist who marked the time signature/ All all friends..." They built a house somewhere close to the sea and went to Bahia, Ouro Preto and Rio de Janeiro. Eduardo got a job at Banco Central and Mônica is a professor.

A 2016 article by science magazine Superinteressante suggested that the couple was unlikely to have a long-lasting relationship, based on what the verses say about them and analyzing such info against diverse scientific researches on reasons why couples break up.

== In other media ==
The song inspired a play by Adolar Gangorra in which he depicts Eduardo as a victim of "a newspapers' culture pages pop culture, which Monica makes him follow".

A film based on the song was announced in 2019 with Gabriel Leone and Alice Braga on the titular roles. It will be directed by René Sampaio, who also directed Brazilian Western, another film based on a Legião Urbana song. The film was due on 11 June 2020 and it was screened at the 2020 edition of Miami International Film Festival, before it was cancelled following the COVID-19 pandemic. By June, its premiere date was still uncertain due to the pandemic.

=== Ads ===
In 2001, fragments of the song were used in an ad by telecommunications company ATL (currently Claro). Later, on 7 June 2011, the song's 25th anniversary, a short clip was developed by another telecommunications company, Vivo. The clip, released on YouTube a few days before Valentine's Day in Brazil, is a tribute to the date and has the song as its soundtrack.

== Bibliography ==
- Alexandre, Ricardo (2013). Dias de Luta: O rock e o Brasil dos anos 80. Porto Alegre: Arquipélago. ISBN 978-85-60171-39-2.
- Conversações com Renato Russo. Campo Grande: Letra Livre. 1996. ISBN 978-85-86399-02-2.
- Fuscaldo, Chris (2016). Discobiografia Legionária. São Paulo: LeYa. ISBN 978-85-441-0481-1.
