= Gilberto Mendes =

Brazilian composer

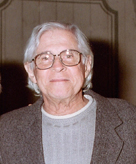
Gilberto Mendes

Gilberto Mendes (13 October 1922 – 1 January 2016) was a 20th-century Brazilian avant-garde composer, and one of the pioneering fathers of the company New Consonant Music.

== Biography ==
Gilberto Mendes was born in Santos, Brazil, in 1922. He studied piano with Antonieta Rudge and harmony with Sabino de Benedictis. The influence of Villa-Lobos is evident in his early works, in some way preceding the advent of bossa nova in his early songs. His contact with the poets of the Noigandres group gave him the ideological inspiration to feed his talent.

He attended the Santos Conservatory from 1941 to 1948, where he studied harmony with Savino de Benedictis and piano with Antonietta Rudge.

He later studied composition under Cláudio Santoro in 1954 and under George Olivier Toni from 1958 to 1960. In 1962 and 1968 he attended the Darmstadt International Summer Courses for New Music where he attended classes given by Pierre Boulez, Henri Pousseur, and Karlheinz Stockhausen. In 1962 he created the New Music Festival and in 1963 was a signatory of the Manifesto Música Nova (New Music Manifesto). He was a pioneer of aleatoric and concrete music in Brazil, using new musical notations and theatrical elements.

Mendes's compositions include cantatas, motets, orchestral music, incidental music, solo and chamber pieces, and some avant-garde works. Most of them are published by Alain Van Kerckhoven Editeur.

In 1965, he founded the Santos New Music Festival. In the 1970s and 1980s, he taught at the University of Wisconsin–Milwaukee and the University of Texas, then was a professor of music at the University of São Paulo (USP).

== Discography ==
- Francisco Mignone, Almeida Prado, Gilberto Mendes - I Bienal De Música Contemporânea Brasileira - Disco 3 (LP) Not On Label SCM1003 1975
- Fernando Cerqueira (2), Gilberto Mendes, Lindemberque R. Cardoso, Radamés Gnattali - ii Bienal De Musica Brasileira Contemporanea Disco 3 (LP, Album) Bienal De Música Brasileira Contemporânea SCM-1007 1977
- Dantas Leite* / Mendes* / Paraskevaídis* - La Voz, La Palabra (LP, Ltd) Tacuabé T/E 11 1978
- Gilberto Mendes (LP) Odeon 31C 063 422709 1979
- Marcel Worms - Gilberto Mendes, Alicia Terzian, Emil Viklický, Burton Greene, Vincent Van Warmerdam, Jacob Ter Veldhuis, Daan Manneke, Hanna Kulenty, Various - More New Blues For Piano (CD, Album) NM Extra 98021 2001
- Ricardo Tacuchian, Wayne Peterson, Christopher James (17), Raoul Pleskow, Gilberto Mendes - Carnaval / Carnival: Music From Brazil And The U.S. (CD) North/South Recordings N/S R 1028 2002
- Piano Solo: Rimsky (CD-ROM) LAMI LAMI-003 2003
- A Música de Gilberto Mendes - Vários Compositores Num Só Compositor Do Modernismo Ao Pós-Modernismo (CD, Album) Selo SESC SP CDSS 0025/10 2010
