= Damares =

Brazilian gospel singer (born 1980)

- Born: Damares Alves Bezerra de Oliveira; January 30, 1980 (age 46); Umuarama, Paraná, Brazil
- Genres: Pop; gospel
- Occupation: Singer
- Years active: 1997–present
- Labels: Sony Music (2010 – present); Louvor Eterno (1999–2009); Louvores ao Rei (1997–1998)
- Website: cantoradamares.com

Damares Alvez Bezerra de Oliveira (born January 30, 1980), known as Damares, is a Brazilian gospel singer. Popularly known as "Diva of Pentecostal Music", her talent awarded trophies in the categories of "Album of the Year", "Song of the Year" among others and Promises in the categories of "Best Video", "Best Singer" among others. The Revelation album has sold over 600,000 copies, making Damares become known in Brazil and abroad.

Their newest album, Diamante (Diamond) has sold over 400,000 copies is between making more CDs sold in 2011, according to ABPD, only behind artists like Paula Fernandes, Father Marcelo Rossi and Father Fábio de Melo. In exclusive list of international artists this singer in ninth place, but the list of national singer getting up a position in eighth place. The singer was the only Christian among musicians. Also on the list were the singer Ludmila Ferber, in sixteenth place with "O Poder da Aliança" and the musical group Diante do Trono, in the position of twelfth best selling DVD in 2011.

== Biography ==
Damares is the daughter of the Pastor Antonio and Rosa Maria Bezerra (née Alvez), Damares is younger sister of seven brothers. She studied at the Municipal School of Augusto Angels. Damares is married to the pastor Aldori de Oliveira. They married when she was just 16 years.

The singer became known in the gospel world in 2008, when she released the album Revelation, which sold over 600,000 copies, including the song "Sabor de Mel" (lit. "Taste of Honey"), which became a fever on the radio segment, and earned her several Talento Trophy awards in 2009, having won the Revelation category alongside Mariana Valadão.

In 2009, in Curitiba she was recording a live album recorded on CD and DVD. The following year, the singer closes contract with Sony Music and released the album Diamante, which sold 130,000 copies in a month, and how is the album title, is a diamond with more than 300,000 copies sold.

In 2011, the singer was nominated in several categories in the Trophy Promessas, and on October 22 the same year she recorded a live DVD with an audience of more than 60,000 people. The recording was made during the event Glorifica Litoral, in the city of São Sebastião, São Paulo, and still others brought singers and groups like the Rescue. It is on record views on YouTube. Only a music video for "Sabor de Mel" has more than five million views, and the song "Um Novo Vencedor" from his latest album was nearly half a million views a month. She also was one of those invited to participate in the Festival Promessas, an event that brought together some 20, 000 people in Flamengo Park and aired on Rede Globo. Besides Damares, the singers were fellow gospel singer Fernandinho, Eyshila, Fernanda Brum, Davi Sacer, Pregador Luo, Ludmila Ferber, Regis Danese and Diante do Trono. The transmission of the event was a success on TV, making the station was isolated leader of audience.

Damares also received the title of "Ambassador of Peace" by the United Nations.

== Discography ==
Studio Albums

Title	Details	Sales	Certications
Asas de Águia	Released: 1997; Label: Louvores ao Rei; Format: K7		
A Vitória É Nossa	Released: June 2000; Label: Louvor Eterno; Format: CD, Playback, download digital		
Agenda de Deus	Released: 2002; Label: Louvor Eterno; Format: CD, Playback, download digital		
O Deus que Faz	Released: February 1, 2004; Label: Louvor Eterno; Format: CD, Playback, download digital	BRA: 150,000	ABPD: Gold
Diário de um Vencedor	Released: March 4, 2006; Label: Louvor Eterno; Format: CD, Playback, download digital	BRA: 130,000	ABPD: Gold
Apocalipse	Released: May 8, 2008; Label: Louvor Eterno; Format: CD, Playback, download digital	BRA: 1,000,000	ABPD: Diamond
Diamante	Released: November 30, 2010; Label: Sony Music; Format: CD, Playback, download digital	BRA: 500,000	ABPD: Diamond
O Maior Troféu	Released: April 29, 2013; Label: Sony Music; Format: CD, Playback, download digital	BRA: 300,000	ABPD: Diamond
Obra Prima	Released: November 4, 2016; Label: Sony Music; Format: CD, Playback, download digital	BRA: 60,000	ABPD: Gold

Live Albums

Title	Details	Sales	Certications
A Minha Vitória Tem Sabor de Mel – Ao Vivo	Released: September 12, 2009; Label: Louvor Eterno; Format: CD, DVD, download digital	BRA: 200,000	ABPD: Platinum
Uma Vida, Uma História – Ao Vivo	Released: December 2011; Label: Sony Music; Format: CD, DVD, download digital	BRA: 75,000	ABPD: Gold
O Maior Troféu ao Vivo	Released: March 2015; Label: Sony Music; Format: CD, DVD, download digital	BRA: 40,000	ABPD: Gold

Video Albums

Title	Details	Sales	Certications
A Minha Vitória Tem Sabor de Mel – Ao Vivo	Released: September 12, 2009; Label: Louvor Eterno; Format: CD, DVD, download digital	BRA: 50,000	ABPD: Platinum
Uma Vida, Uma História – Ao Vivo	Released: December 2011; Label: Sony Music; Format: CD, DVD, download digital	BRA: 30,000	ABPD: Gold
O Maior Troféu ao Vivo	Released: March 2015; Label: Sony Music; Format: CD, DVD, download digital	BRA: 40,000	ABPD: Gold

== Awards and nominations ==
Troféu Talento

Year	Nominee / work	Award	Result
2009	Apocalypse	Album of the Year	Nominated
2009	Sabor de Mel	Music of the Year	Nominated
2009	Apocalypse	Album Pentecostals	Nominated
2009	Damares	Featured of 2008	Nominated
2009	"Damares"	"Singer of the year"	Nominated
2009	Damares	Revelation Women	Won

Troféu Promessas

Year	Nominee / work	Award	Result
2011	Um Novo Vencedor	Best Video	Nominated
2011	Um Novo Vencedor	Best Music	Nominated
2011	Damares	Best Singer	Nominated
2011	Diamante ("Diamond")	Best CD / Best Album	Won
2012	Ao Vivo em São Sebastião ("Live in San Sebastian")	Best CD/Best Album	Nominated
2012	Consolador e Sabor de Mel ("Comforter and Taste of Honey")	Best Music	Nominated
2012	Damares	Best Singer	Nominated
2012	Ao Vivo em São Sebastião ("Live in San Sebastian")	Best DVD/Blu-ray	Nominated
2012	Ao Vivo em São Sebastião ("Live in San Sebastian")	Best CD Pentecostal	Won
