= Octávio Pinto =

Brazilian composer

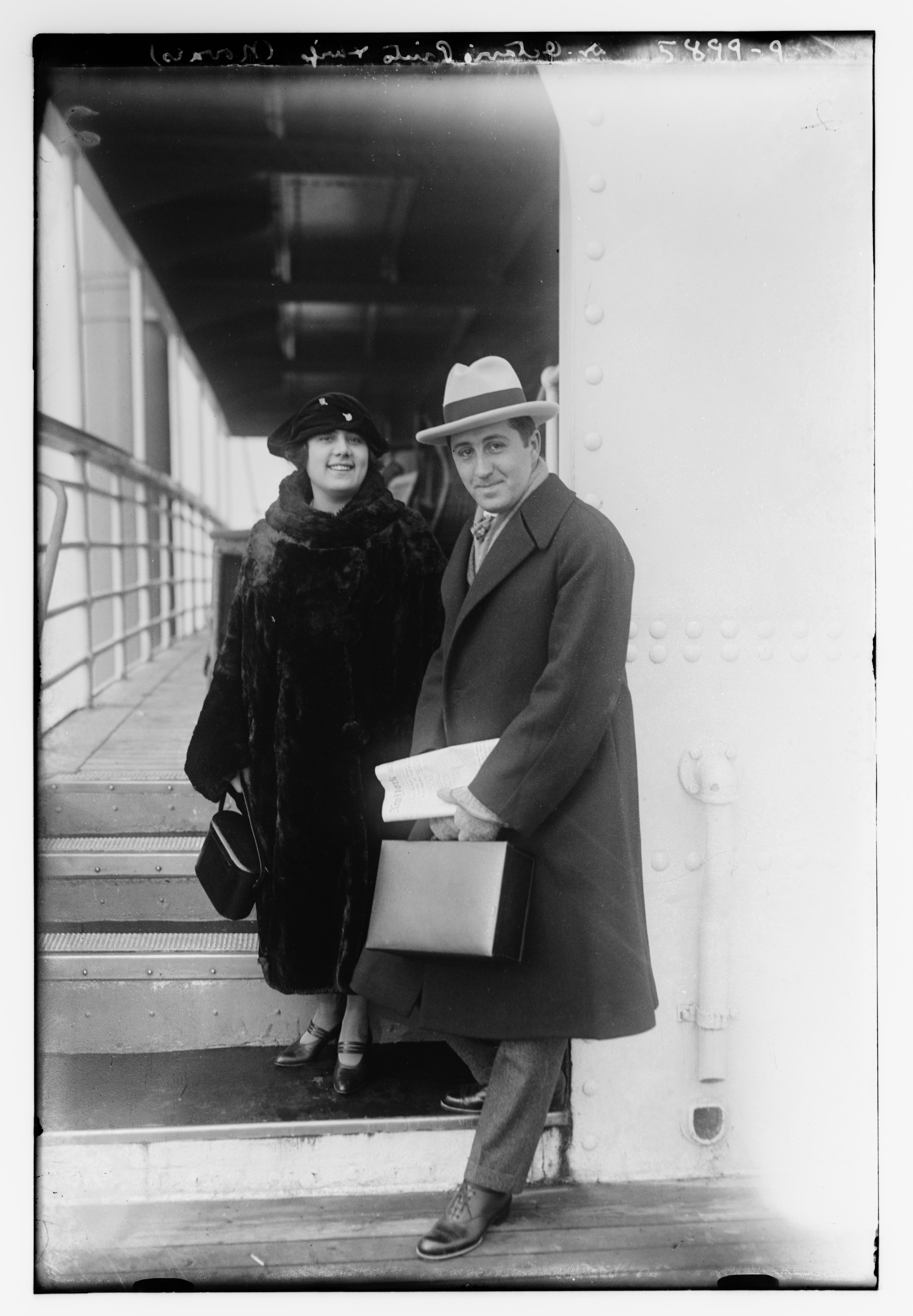
- Octávio Pinto and Guiomar Novaes
- Born: November 3, 1890
- Died: October 31, 1950 (aged 59)
- Era: 20th century

Octávio Pinto (November 3, 1890 – October 31, 1950) was a Brazilian composer and architect. He was married to Guiomar Novaes, a major figure among twentieth-century Brazilian pianists.

Born in São Paulo, Pinto was not a professional musician, but rather an architect who carried out business across Brazil. In his youth, however, he took lessons with the famous Hungarian-French pianist Isidor Philipp, who taught Guiomar Novaes while she studied at the Paris Conservatoire, and wrote several pieces for solo piano until his death in 1950. His best-known and most-performed music comes from his Scenas Infantis (Childhood Scenes), a suite composed in 1932 for his wife, who performed the suite and brought attention to her husband's work.

Pinto was well known in Latin American music circles even before marrying Novaes. He was also a close friend of Heitor Villa-Lobos, the best-known composer of Brazilian classical music of the twentieth century.

== Principal compositions ==
=== Solo piano ===
- Scenas Infantis (1932)
  - Corre corre
  - Roda roda
  - Marcha soldadinho
  - Dorme, nene
  - Salta, salta
- Festa de Criancas (1939)
- Marcha do Pequeno Polegar (1941)
- Improviso (1942)
- Dança Negreira (1945)

=== Art songs ===
- Você
- Prece
- Presente de Natale
- Cantiga praiana e Primavera, on texts by Vicente de Carvalho
