= Davi Sacer =

- Born: 30 November 1975 (age 50); Nova Iguaçu, Rio de Janeiro, Brazil
- Genres: Contemporary Christian music, Worship music, pop rock
- Instrument: Vocals
- Years active: 1994–present
- Labels: Art Gospel, Som Livre
- Website: www.davisacer.com.br

Davi Sacer, known by his stage name Davi Amorim de Oliveira (Nova Iguaçu, November 30, 1975) is a Brazilian gospel singer, songwriter and multi-instrumentalist. He began his career in music at the age of eight when he became the lead singer of his older brother's band. His first album was Deus Não Falhará (God Won't Fail), released in 2008. Two years later, he recorded the album Confio Em Ti (I Trust in Thee). His discography also includes the work No Caminho do Milagre ("On the Path of the Miracle"), recorded live, and Às Margens do Teu Rio (At the Margins of Thy River), in 2012.

Beside the singer Luiz Arcanjo, Davi was lead singer of the groups Toque no Altar and Trazendo a Arca. He worked for four years at Toque no Altar and another four in Trazendo a Arca, leaving both to devote to his solo career. Some of their songs caused controversy among Christians for his anthropocentric lyrics.

The artist is married to Veronica Sacer, who accompanies him on his travels and events, and sings a duet with him. Together, the couple have two children, Breno and Maressa. Davi Sacer is a member of the Apascentar Church in Nova Iguaçu, located in the city of Nova Iguaçu.

== Discography ==
Solo

- 2008: Deus não Falhará
- 2010: Confio em Ti
- 2011: No Caminho do Milagre
- 2012: Às Margens do Teu Rio
- 2014: Venha o Teu Reino
- 2015: Meu Abrigo
- 2017: DNA
- 2019: 15 Anos

Trazendo a Arca

- 2007: Marca da Promessa
- 2007: Ao Vivo no Japão
- 2008: Ao Vivo no Maracanãzinho
- 2009: Pra Tocar no Manto
- 2009: Salmos e Cânticos Espirituais
- 2012: Trazendo a Arca Deluxe Collection

Toque no Altar

- 2003: Toque no Altar
- 2004: Restituição
- 2005: Deus de Promessas
- 2006: Olha pra Mim
- 2007: Deus de Promessas Ao Vivo
- 2011: Ao Deus das Causas Impossíveis
