= Appian Publications & Recordings =

British music company

Appian Publications & Recordings (APR) is a British company specialising in the restoration and re-issue of early recordings of classical music.

APR was apparently the brainchild of Edwin Alan and much of the transferring and remastering of historical recordings was done by Bryan Crimp, who previously spent time with EMI. The APR website refers to Crimp as the founder, and the company changed hands after his retirement in Sept 2004, and was relocated from Hexham in Northumberland to London. The new owner is Mike Spring who was until 2014 employed at Hyperion Records.

The company has gained a number of international honours for its work. The Franz Liszt Society of Budapest has awarded them the Grand Prix International Liszt du Disque nine times. Their current catalogue includes significant performances by famous musicians such as Vladimir Horowitz, Walter Gieseking, Edwin Fischer, Percy Grainger, Guiomar Novaes, Kathleen Ferrier, Jorge Bolet, Sergio Fiorentino, Arturo Toscanini, and many others.

== See also ==
- Lists of record labels
