= Salmos e Cânticos Espirituais =

Studio album by Trazendo a Arca
- Released: December 2009
- Genre: Christian rock Contemporary Christian music
- Length: 51:11
- Label: Independent
- Producer: Ronald Fonseca and Wagner Derek

Trazendo a Arca chronology
Pra Tocar no Manto (2009)	Salmos e Cânticos Espirituais (2009)	Entre a Fé e a Razão (2010)

Salmos e Cânticos Espirituais is the third studio album by Trazendo a Arca based in psalms. Was released in 2009.

== Track listing ==
1. "Reina o Senhor"
2. "Se não fosse o Senhor"
3. "Nosso Deus é Santo"
4. "Por que Te Abates"
5. "Em Ti Esperarei"
6. "Preparado Está"
7. "Ouve Oh! Deus"
8. "Contigo Habitarei"
9. "Aquele que Habita"
10. "Me Levanta com Tua Destra"
11. "Te Busco Ansiosamente"

== Personnel ==
- Luiz Arcanjo (lead vocals)
- Davi Sacer (lead vocals)
- Verônica Sacer (lead vocals)
- André Mattos (drums)
- Ronald Fonseca (keyboard, piano, produce)
- Deco Rodrigues (bass)
- Isaac Ramos (guitar)
