= Tempo Perdido (Legião Urbana song) =

1986 single by Legião Urbana

Single by Legião Urbana

from the album Dois
- Released: 24 June 1986
- Genre: Post-punk
- Length: 5:01 (album version); 3:49 (single edit)
- Label: EMI-Odeon
- Songwriter: Renato Russo
- Producer: Mayrton Bahia

Legião Urbana singles chronology
"Soldados" (1986)	"Tempo Perdido" (1986)	"Eduardo e Mônica" (1986)

Music video
- "Tempo Perdido" on YouTube

"Tempo Perdido" (Portuguese for "Wasted time") is a single by the Brazilian rock band Legião Urbana, Written by the vocalist Renato Russo, it was original released as the second promo single of the 1986 album Dois in July of the same year, is the most played song of the band according to the Escritório Central de Arrecadação e Distribuição (ECAD). The last verse of this song, "Somos tão jovens" (We're so young), inspired the title of Russo's biopic of the same name.

== Background ==
The track started as a composition called Gente Obsoleta, a composition that Renato Russo wrote when he was in the band Aborto Elétrico. In some moments of 1983 or 1984, Renato Russo wrote a song called 1977 which contained verses that were later reused in the song Tempo Perdido. In 1984, Renato Russo had near-finished writing the song, but he was not satisfied with the verses and decided to look for someone to help him to rewrite them. He didn't have anyone to help him so he decided to finish writing the song alone. In November 1984, Legião Urbana played for the first time the song in the boate Mamão com Açúcar of Rio de Janeiro.

In a letter sent to record label EMI with album notes, Russo said that the track was "until now unbeatable as the last track of the first side and too dense for extensive airplay. Many believe, however, that it is the strongest track of the album and, consequently, an instant hit single. But it is not the track to be worked at the start. The conception originally included a final acoustic sequence that would be an impromptu (acoustic guitar, wind, campfire, waves, effects) commenting on the theme and the ideas presented by the song itself and preparing the terrain for the second part of the work, side 2."

== Released ==
The track was released as a promotional single on 25 June 1986, being a month before the released of the album. The song became a big success in the Brazilians radios and peaking in the top position in the charts of the radio station Transamérica FM. The track was later featured in the compilation Rock Total by the label Som Livre.

The band created two music video of the song, the first being aired on Fantástico and the other being fully recorded in black and white.

== Track listing ==
12" PROMO (EMI 9951 005)

Side A

- A1. "Tempo Perdido" – 3:49

Side B

- B1. "Tempo Perdido" – 3:49
- B2. "Mensagens Legião Urbana"

== Personnel ==
- Renato Russo – vocals, acoustic guitar
- Dado Villa-Lobos – guitar
- Renato Rocha – bass
- Marcelo Bonfá – drums

== Charts ==
Chart (2025)	Peak position
Brazil (Brasil Hot 100)	61
