= Deise Rosa =

- Born: 8 September 1974 (age 51); São Paulo, São Paulo, Brazil
- Genres: Contemporary Christian music, contemporary worship music, pop rock
- Occupations: Singer, songwriter
- Instrument: Vocals
- Years active: 2005–present
- Label: Independent
- Website: deiserosa.com.br

Deise Rosa de Almeida (born 8 September 1974) is a Brazilian Christian singer and songwriter.

== Biography ==
Deise Rosa was born in a Christian family and since childhood has always been involved with music. With only eleven years old she started singing in the choir of the Baptist Church of Brasilândia in São Paulo.

In 2002, Deise received her call to the music area, but it was only in 2005 that materialized when she released her first album independently. The album titled Tuas Promessas was recorded by guitarist Tim Mendes in his studio.

In 2010, the second album of her career was launched once again recorded at Tim Mendes studio. Viver Pela Fé, the name of her second album, it received rave reviews and was highly praised. The album tour has undergone several cities the state of São Paulo reached multitudes.

== Discography ==
Solo career

- Tuas Promessas (2005)
- Viver Pela Fé (2010)
