= O Terço =

Brazilian rock musical group

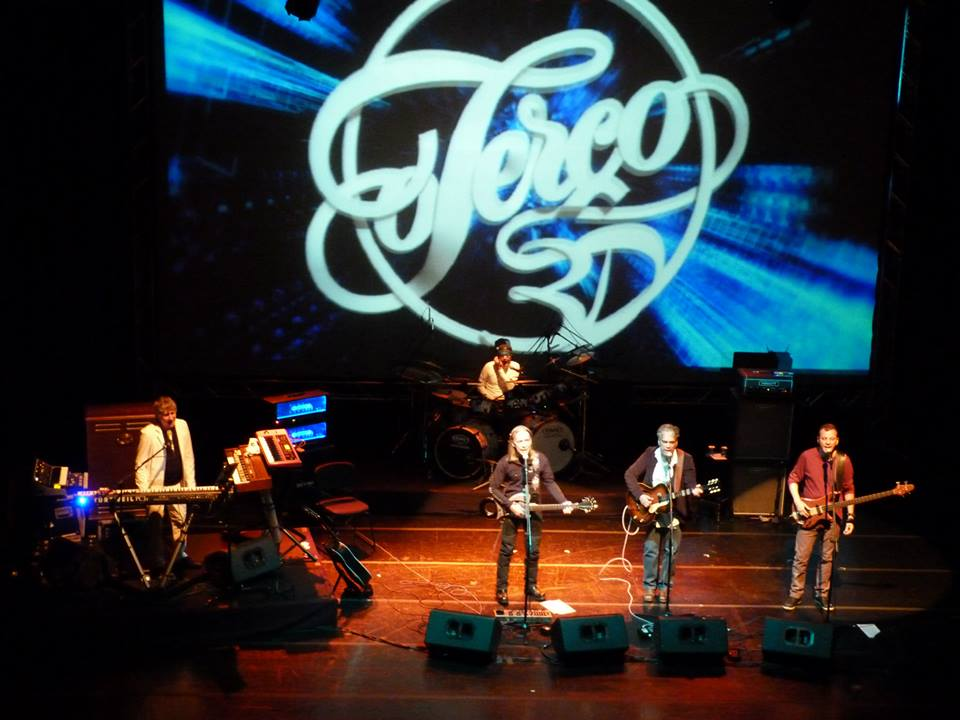
- O Terço in 2013

Background information
- Origin: Rio de Janeiro, Brazil
- Genres: Progressive rock; hard rock; blues rock; folk rock
- Years active: 1968–present
- Labels: Sony Music, Som Livre
- Past members: Jorge Amiden, Cezar de Mercês, Vinicius Cantuária, Luiz Moreno

O Terço was one of the first progressive rock bands from Brazil. The band, whose name means "rosary beads" in Portuguese, first formed in 1968.

Personnel changes would become part of the band's dynamic, with Sergio Hinds assuming the role of band anchor. The group owed a lot of its early sound to such Italian favorites as Locanda Delle Fate, Quella Vecchia Locanda, and Premiata Forneria Marconi. They also managed to mix in other styles, like folk, and MPB (Brazilian Popular Music), which made the band sound similar to Milton Nascimento, Tom Jobim and other great Brazilian artists.

On their first album eponymously named, O Terço, the band was not yet defined by progressive music, but it is a seminal work in the history Brazilian progressive music. There are obvious influences of the Moody Blues, and Pink Floyd. Terço II (1973) would see them moving from Psychedelic to heavier sounds, along the lines of King Crimson and Led Zeppelin. It was 1975's Criaturas da Noite that became a monumental success. It was a big hit, gave Brazil its first classic prog album, and solidified O Terço's place in music history.

In the 1980s, the band began to tour the United States and Europe. This would make them more popular in other parts of the world, than they were at home.

They continued to release albums into the late 1990s. Many times trying to experiment with different styles. A possible reformation of the classic Criaturas da Noite (1975) lineup was in the works in 2001/2002, but an unexpected death of their drummer postponed the idea to 2005, when they made a couple of live presentations, only in Brazil.

O Terço's musicians were widely successful in other Brazilian groups, chiefly 14 Bis, which had a softer and less progressive sound.

== Discography ==
=== Studio albums ===
- O Terço (1970)
- Terço (1973)
- Criaturas da Noite (1975)
- Shining Days, Summer Nights (English language) (1976)
- Casa Encantada (1976)
- Mudança de Tempo (1978)
- Som Mais Puro (1983)
- O Terço (1990)
- Time Travellers (English language) (1992)
- Compositores (1996)
- Spiral Words (English language) (1998)
- Tributo a Raul Seixas (1999)

=== Live albums ===
- Live at Palace (1994)
- Ao Vivo no Teatro João Caetano, Rio de Janeiro (recorded in 1976) (2005)
- Ao Vivo (recorded in 2005) (2007)

=== Contributions ===
- Vento Sul (Marcos Valle) (1972)
- Nunca (Sá e Guarabyra) (1974)
