= Hillsong Church São Paulo =

- Country: Brazil
- Denomination: Hillsong Church
- Website: hillsong.com/saopaulo/

History
- Founded: May 2016

Clergy
- Pastor(s): Chris and Lucy Mendez

Hillsong Church São Paulo is a congregation of Hillsong Church which meets in São Paulo, Brazil, the largest city in the Americas. Other satellite congregations meet in Sydney, London, Paris, Kyiv, Cape Town, Stockholm, New York City and Buenos Aires.

According to Hillsong Church senior pastor Brian Houston, the inauguration of the church in Brazil will be a major breakthrough. The pastor also pointed out that the Portuguese language, spoken in Brazil, is one of the most important in the world and it is a great achievement to open the Hillsong church in the city that is the heart of Latin America.

Chris and Lucy Mendez are pastors responsible for opening the church in the two largest cities in South America, Hillsong Buenos Aires and Hillsong São Paulo.

== The church ==
The first official worship service of Hillsong Church São Paulo, held on May 31, 2016, filled the Audio Club, a concert hall located in the neighbourhood of Barra Funda that has 3.2 thousand people standing or a thousand seated. Recently, the church met in the Villaggio JK auditorium, located in Vila Olímpia, near the center of São Paulo.
