= Tony Babalu =

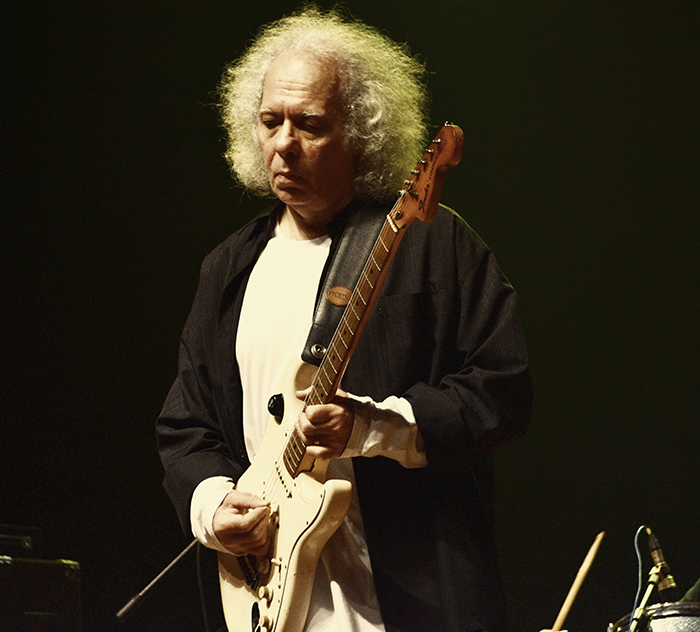
- Tony Babalu 2019 - by Osmar Santos Jr.

Background information
- Also known as: Babalu, Toni
- Born: A. Medeiros Junior; 29 December 1953 (age 72); Sao Paulo, Sao Paulo, Brazil
- Genres: Rock and roll, blues, rock, funk, black music, rhythm and blues
- Occupations: Musician, songwriter, record producer, artistic director
- Instruments: Guitar, bass,
- Years active: 1970–present
- Labels: Amellis Records, RGE, BMG
- Member of: Made in Brazil; Bem Nascidos e Mal Criados
- Website: tonybabalu.com

Tony Babalu is a Brazilian guitar player.

== Career ==
Tony Babalu began his career in the 1970s as guitarist of the Made in Brazil band.

Babalu created the funk-rock band Bem Nascidos e Mal Criados.

In 2003, Babalu recorded his first instrumental work, the CD "Balada na Noite".

Between 2005 and 2007, Babalu was responsible for directing and producing the CDs "Noite Proibida" (Marise Marra) and "Maga Lieri" (Maga Lieri), both released by label Amellis Records (Tratore's distribution).

In 2012, Babalu founded the instrumental power trio BETAGROOVEBAND, with Marina Abramowicz on drums and PV Ribeiro on bass.

== Discography ==
=== With Made in Brazil ===
Discography

- "Made in Brazil" (1974/1999) – released in LP through RCA in 1974 and re-issued in CD through BMG in 1999
- "Jack O Estripador" (1976/1999) – released in LP through RCA in 1976 and re-issued in CD through BMG in 1999
- "Massacre" (1977/2005) – originally recorded in 1977 by RCA and officially released in 2005 through Made in Brazil Records
- "Paulicéia Desvairada" (1978/1999) – released in LP through RCA in 1978 e re-issued in CD through BMG in 1999
- "Minha Vida É Rock'n Roll" (1981/1999) – released in LP through RCA in 1981 and re-issued in CD through BMG in 1999
- "Deus Salva... O Rock Alivia" (1986), RGE
- "Made Pirata Vol. I" (1986/1999) – released in LP through RGE in 1986 and re-issued in CD through BMG in 1999
- "Made Pirata Vol. II" (1986/1999) – released in LP through RGE in 1986 and re-issued in CD through BMG in 1999
- "Sexo, Blues & Rock'n Roll" (1998), Made In Brazil Records
- "Fogo na Madeira – Acústico – Made in Brazil Ao Vivo" (2000), Made in Brazil Records – recorded live from Delta Blues Bar (Campinas/Brazil) and from Bourbon Street (Sao Paulo/Brazil)
- "Fogo na Madeira II – Acústico – Made In Brazil Ao Vivo" (2001), Made In Brazil Records – recorded live from the SESI Theater (Sao Paulo/Brazil) and from Bourbon Street (Sao Paulo/Brazil)
- "Rock de Verdade" (2008), Made in Brazil Records

=== As solo artist ===
- "Balada na Noite" (2005), Amellis Records
- "Live Sessions at Mosh" (2014), Amellis Records

=== As artistic director ===
- "Maga Lieri" (2005), Amellis Records - eponymous album of Maga Lieri
- "Noite Proibida" (2005), Amellis Records – release by guitarist, singer and writer Marise Marra
