= Zé Rodrix =

Brazilian musician (1947–2009)

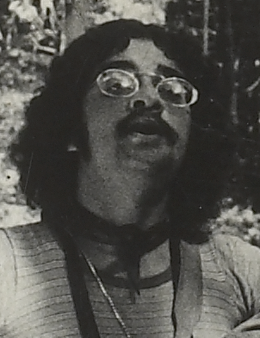
Zé Rodrix in 1972

Zé Rodrix (Portuguese pronunciation: [ˈzɛ ʁoˈdɾiks]; 25 November 1947 – 22 May 2009) was a Brazilian composer, instrumentalist, and singer. He was well known in his native country for performing with musical ensembles Sá, Rodrix & Guarabyra, Som Imaginário and Momento Quatro.

A native of Rio de Janeiro, José Rodrigues Trindade used a modified spelling of his middle name as part of his stage name throughout a career that spanned over four decades. Som Imaginario, with another well-known member, Robertinho Silva, accompanied Milton Nascimento and Gal Costa and, in 1971, Elis Regina's recording of his rock-rural "Casa no Campo" (with Tavito) became a huge hit. During the 1970s, Sá e Guarabyra would continue as a duo while Rodrix pursued a solo career. Both acts played what they described as "rural rock", "a synthesis of the escapist dream depicted in the American folk-rock songs of the '60s within the reality of upcountry Brazil".

A longtime resident of São Paulo, Zé Rodrix died of natural causes at the age of 61.

== Discography ==
=== Group albums ===
- 1968: Momento Quatro - with Momento Quatro (Philips)
- 1970: Som Imaginário - with Som Imaginário (Odeon)
- 1971: Passado, Presente & Futuro - with Sá, Rodrix e Guarabyra (Odeon)
- 1973: Terra - with Sá, Rodrix & Guarabyra (Odeon)
- 2001: Outra Vez na Estrada - Ao Vivo - with Sá, Rodrix & Guarabyra (Som Livre)
- 2008: Amanhã - with Sá, Rodrix & Guarabyra (Som Livre)

=== Solo albums ===
- 1973: I Acto (Odeon)
- 1974: Quem Sabe Sabe Quem Não Sabe Não Precisa Saber (Odeon)
- 1976: Soy Latino Americano (EMI-Odeon)
- 1977: Quando Será? (EMI-Odeon)
- 1979: Hora Extra (EMI-Odeon)
- 1979: Sempre Livre (RCA Victor)
- 1981: Seu Abelardo/Rock do Planalto (Continental)
- 1983: Saqueando a Cidade - with Joelho de Porco (Lira Paulistana/Continental)
- 1988: 18 Anos Sem Sucesso - with Joelho de Porco (Eldorado)

=== Soundtracks ===
- Batimam e Robim (1993)
- Oh! Rebuceteio (1984)
- Amor de Perversão (1982)
- Mulheres... Mulheres (1981)
- Viagem ao Céu da Boca (1981)
- Massacre em Caxias (1979)
- As Grã-Finas e o Camelô (1976)
- O Sexomaníaco (1976)
- O Esquadrão da Morte (1975)
- Corrida do Ouro (1975)
- Motel (1974)
- O Sexo das Bonecas (1974)
- Salve-se Quem Puder
