= São Paulo Ska Jazz =

Brazilian ska-jazz band

Sao Paulo Ska Jazz
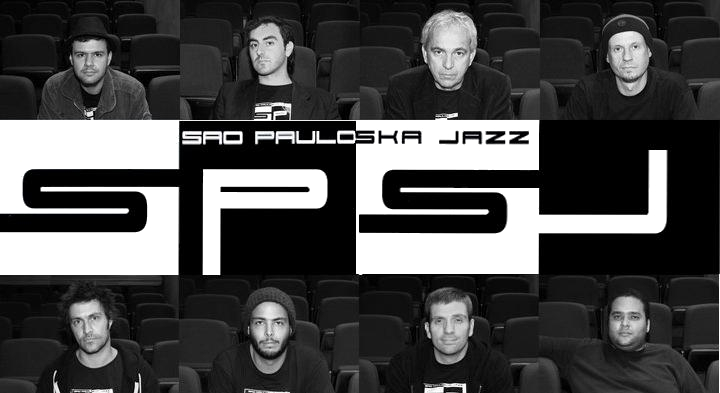

Background information
- Origin: São Paulo, SP, Brazil
- Genres: Ska, jazz, reggae, bossa nova, samba, frevo
- Years active: 2009 – present
- Labels: Independent
- Members: Marcelo Calderazzo; Aquiles Faneco; Ramon Montagner; Sydnei Ferraz; Manu Falleiros; Marcelo "Pomps"; Reynaldo Izeppi; Douglas "Little Tiger"
- Website: São Paulo Ska Jazz

São Paulo Ska Jazz is a Brazilian ska-jazz band formed by musicians of the pop and jazz scene in São Paulo. It was created between the years of 2007 and 2008 by Marcelo Calderazzo (bassist and producer).

== Career ==
The band released their first album in 2009, entitled São Paulo Ska Jazz. In 2010, they were selected by the German label MadButcher to participate in the compilation V.A. Skannibal Party Volume 10 CD. Their style has been compared to bands like Tokyo Ska Paradise Orchestra, New York Ska Jazz, Ska Jazz Foundation and Saint Petersburg Ska Jazz Review.

The band has shared the stage with Canadian singer Chris Murray, Tato Falamansa and the singer Fernanda Porto. It played in pubs and theatres in São Paulo: SESCs Pompeia, Consolação, Vila Mariana, Osasco, SESI Bauru, Marilia, Ribeirão Preto; Virada Cultural de Bauru, Festival Expresso Jazz, Festival de Paraty, Festival de Inverno de Rio Claro; Jazz nos Fundos, Bourbon Street Music Club and Bleeker St Pub.

São Paulo Ska Jazz launches its second CD with 10 new compositions. Known as Gringo, the record is defined by the contagious spirit of Ska swing, Jamaican original rhythm, jazz improvisation, soul music, rock, salsa and reggae. In addition, to sharpen foreigner curiosity, the work has a tap of genuine and original Brazilian styles: Bossa Nova and Frevo. Gringo features seven new authorial songs, as "A Onda", "Saluda" and "SP", written by Marcelo Calderazzo, "Chemical", by Marcelo Calderazzo and Manu Falleiros, "Skazz", by Ramon Montagner, "Hora do Rush", by Renato Guizelini and Skaramouche (Gabriel Stampfli), and three other reinterpretations: "Sampa" (Caetano Veloso), "Adiós Nonino" (Astor Piazzolla) and "Three Little Birds" (Bob Marley). According to band leader Marcelo Calderazzo, the new project has the objective to demystify the Ska music. "Our plan is to bring lightness, informality and celebration without losing the attitude and magnificence of the instrumental music," he says. In addition to the CD songs, the show playlist counts on other band members compositions as "São Paulo" and "Alta Frequência" (Renato Guizelini), "220", "Sombrinha" and "Periferia" (Marcelo Calderazzo), and reinterpretations of "Samba de Uma Nota Só" (Tom Jobim/Newton Mendonça), "Smells Like Teen Spirit" (Nirvana), "Wrapped Around Your Finger" (The Police), "Summertime" (George Gershwin), "I Shot the Sheriff" (Bob Marley) and "Rehab" (Amy Winehouse), besides movies soundtracks as The Godfather (Francis Ford Coppola) and Amarcord (Nino Rota).

São Paulo Ska Jazz is composed of Marcelo Calderazzo (electric bass and acoustic), Manu Falleiros (soprano and tenor saxophone), Marcelo Pereira (baritone sax, flute), Douglas Freitas (trombone), Reynaldo Izeppi (trumpet and fluegel horn), Ramon Montagner (drums and electronic programming), Sidney Ferraz (keyboard and piano) and Aquiles Faneco (guitar).

The band has participated in major events and presentations such as Virada Cultural, in São Paulo, in 2010, Bourbon Street Jazz Festival in Paraty, Rio de Janeiro, in 2011 and in a concert at Ibirapuera Hall, Ibirapuera Park, in São Paulo, in 2013. São Paulo Ska Jazz has also included in its shows such participants as Chemical Funk, Jamaican Music Brazilian Orchestra, Brazilian singer Fernanda Porto and Tato Cruz (Falamansa, Brazilian Forró band leader).

Furthermore, the band also developed a partnership with the Ska Music pioneer, the Jamaican Band, Skatalites the last time they were in Brazil, when Ken Stewart (keyboard) and Zem Audu (sax tenor) joined São Paulo Ska Band in 4 songs of the album.

== Members ==
Current

- Marcelo Calderazzo – bass, record producer, composer
- Aquiles Faneco – guitar
- Ramon Montagner – drums
- Sidney Ferraz – piano, keyboards
- Manu Falleiros – alto saxophone, arrangements
- Marcelo "Pomps" Pereira – baritone saxophone, flute
- Reynaldo Izeppi – trumpet
- Douglas "Little Tiger" – trombone

Support members

- Julio Caliman – guitar
- Lael Medina – drums
- Walmir Gil – trumpet
- Jr. Galante – trumpet
- Daniel D´alcantara – trumpet
- Amilcar Rodrigues – trumpet
- Eloy Porto – trombone

Former members

- Renato Guizelini – guitar
- João Lenhari – trumpet
- Sergio Lyra – alto saxophone

== Discography ==
Studio albums

- Gringo- independent (2016)
- São Paulo Ska Jazz- independent (2009)

Compilations

- V.A. Skannibal Party Volume 10 CD MadButcher Records, (2010)
