= 14 Bis (band) =

Brazilian pop-rock band

- Origin: Belo Horizonte, Minas Gerais, Brazil
- Genres: MPB, rock, progressive rock, psychedelic rock, alternative rock, folk rock, brazilian rock, new wave, space rock, art rock, soft rock, caipira, electronic rock, pop rock
- Years active: 1979–present
- Labels: EMI, EMI-Odeon, Odeon Records, Universal Music Brazil, Epic Records, RCA Records, RCA Victor, Sony Music
- Members: Cláudio Venturini; Sérgio Magrão; Vermelho; Hely
- Past members: Flávio Venturini

14 Bis is a Brazilian pop-rock band formed in 1979 in the city of Belo Horizonte, Minas Gerais, by the brothers Cláudio and Flávio Venturini, Sérgio Magrão, Vermelho and Hely Rodrigues. They were mentored by Milton Nascimento.

The band was formed when the members of two bands, O Terço and "Bendegó" decided to merge. Flávio Venturini and Vermelho, two founding members of 14 Bis, were also members of the Clube da Esquina band.

The band took its name from Santos-Dumont's 14 Bis airplane.

Música popular brasileira is a strong element in many of 14 Bis compositions. The influence of progressive rock and Caipira is evident in many of its compositions, such as in their use of analog keyboards and complex vocal arrangements.

The group reached the peak of their success during the 1980s with notable compositions and performance of popular Brazilian songs. Due to the mild, often happy and soothing theme of many of its compositions, the band was quite popular among children.

== History ==
The band was formed in late 1979 by musicians who already knew each other and shared the idea of creating a Brazilian band modeled on international bands that had strongly influenced its members, such as The Beatles, The Rolling Stones, The Who, Deep Purple, Yes, Led Zeppelin, Pink Floyd and others. They were also influenced by the Clube da Esquina. All members are natives of Belo Horizonte, Minas Gerais, except the bassist Sérgio Magrão, a native of Rio de Janeiro. The 1980s are considered the golden age of Brazilian rock: in the final years of the civil-military dictatorship in Brazil, Brazilian rock reflected this context and became popular. In the early 1980s, the song "Linda Juventude" by the Minas Gerais group 14 Bis conveyed this tone, though the experience did not last long because the climate soon changed.

The year 1982 brought Além Paraíso, recorded after a trip to the United States, where the band purchased the best equipment available at the time. One of its hits was "Linda Juventude".

Two years later, in 1985, the sixth album was released, in which 14 Bis experimented with and flirted with British new age. New musical and aesthetic partnerships showed that A Nave Vai, released that year, was multifaceted from its cover to its content. Songs such as "Nuvens", blues such as "Figura Rara", and the new age track "Outras Dimensões" translated the musical restlessness and the members' constant search for something new.

Between 2015 and 2022, after a hiatus due to the COVID-19 pandemic, the group toured throughout Brazil with the show Encontro Marcado, alongside Flávio Venturini and the duo Sá & Guarabyra, as well as a tour commemorating 35 years of their career. In 2016 the show was recorded and released on CD and DVD in partnership with Canal Brasil.

In November 2019 a work celebrating the band's 40th anniversary was released. In 2020 the band released its second DVD, 14 Bis Acústico ao Vivo, recorded on August 10, 2018 at the Teatro Coliseu in Santos, with special appearances by César das Mercês, Celso Nascimento and Flavio Venturini, co-founder and former member of the band as well as composer and collaborator on several recorded songs. The mixing was done by Cláudio Venturini and Christiano Caldas, the band's keyboardist, who also added some finishing touches to the final result.

In 2025 the band celebrated 45 years of activity, an anniversary marked by shows and partnerships throughout the country. At the Circo Voador in Rio de Janeiro, the Minas Gerais band revisits the successes of its career with a blend of rock, MPB and contemporary folk. The group's longevity highlights a vast musical output of 16 albums, and the name "Banda 14 Bis" was declared Intangible Heritage of the municipality.

== Discography ==
The following is the discography of 14 Bis:

=== Studio albums ===
- (1979) 14 Bis
- (1980) 14 Bis II
- (1981) Espelhos das Águas
- (1982) Além Paraíso
- (1983) A Idade da Luz
- (1985) A Nave Vai
- (1987) Sete
- (1992) Quatro por Quatro
- (1996) Siga o Sol
- (1999) Bis
- (2004) Outros Planos

=== Live albums ===
- (1988) 14 Bis ao Vivo
- (2007) 14 Bis ao Vivo
- (2020) 14 Bis Acústico ao Vivo

=== DVDs ===
- (2007) 14 Bis ao Vivo
- (2020) 14 Bis Acústico ao Vivo
