= Maria Alice de Mendonça =

Brazilian musician

Maria Alice de Mendonça is a pianist from Brazil. She won the Latin Grammy Award from the Latin Academy of Recording Arts & Sciences. She has also performed at the Badia di Cava Music Festival and the International Music Festival of Villaller.

She is currently completing her Doctorate in Piano Performance at UCLA, Los Angeles.
