= Cláudio Venturini =

Brazilian composer and singer

- Born: Luís Cláudio Venturini; 14 August 1958 (age 68)
- Origin: Belo Horizonte, Minas Gerais, Brazil
- Genres: Pop, Música popular brasileira, progressive rock
- Occupations: Singer and composer
- Instruments: Singing, classic guitar, electric guitar
- Member of: 14 Bis

Luís Cláudio Venturini (born 14 August 1958) is a Brazilian guitarist, vocalist and composer.

With his elder brother Flávio Venturini, he began his career taking part in the album A Via Láctea of the friend Lô Borges in 1978. One year later he was co-founder of the band 14 Bis, formerly besides his brother Flávio and where he persists nowadays.

In 1987, when Flávio left the group, Cláudio became the main vocalist of the band.

He composed some of the greatest hits of the band like: Mesmo de Brincadeira (with Vermelho and Mariozinho Rocha), Xadrês Chinês (with Vermelho and Chacal), Sonhando o Futuro (with Lô Borges), song that was recorded again by Beto Guedes and Canções de Guerra (with Sérgio Vasconcellos e Chico Amaral).

== See also ==
- Clube da Esquina
