= Charles William Miller =

Brazilian sportsman (1874–1953)

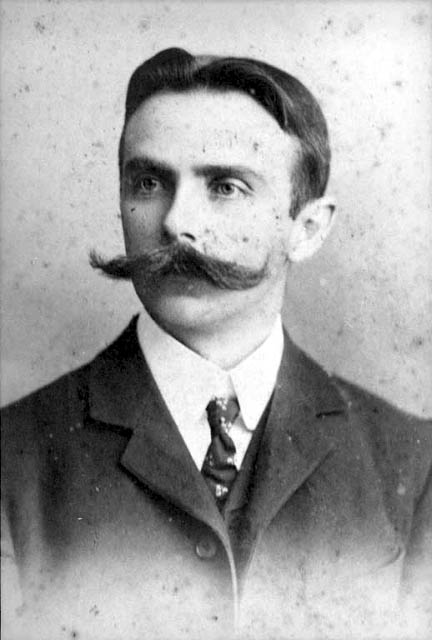
- Born: 24 November 1874; São Paulo, Brazil
- Died: 30 June 1953 (aged 78); São Paulo, Brazil
- Occupations: Sportsman; Civil Servant
- Known for: Introducing football to Brazil

Charles William Miller (24 November 1874 – 30 June 1953. Portuguese pronunciation: [ˈʃaʁliz ˈwiʎɐ̃ ˈmileʁ]) was a Brazilian sportsman, who is considered to be the father of football in Brazil. Miller founded São Paulo Athletic Club (SPAC), one of the oldest sports clubs in Brazil, and founded the Liga Paulista de Foot-Ball, current Campeonato Paulista, Brazil's first football league. He is also considered the father of rugby union in Brazil.

== Early life ==
He was born in São Paulo to John Miller, a Scottish railway engineer and a Brazilian mother of English descent, Carlota Fox.

In 1884 he was sent to the Banister Court public school in Southampton, England where he learned to play football and cricket. Whilst at school, he played for and against both the Corinthians and St. Mary's (now Southampton FC). He was recorded in the 1891 United Kingdom census whilst a boarder at Millbrook School.

== Influence ==
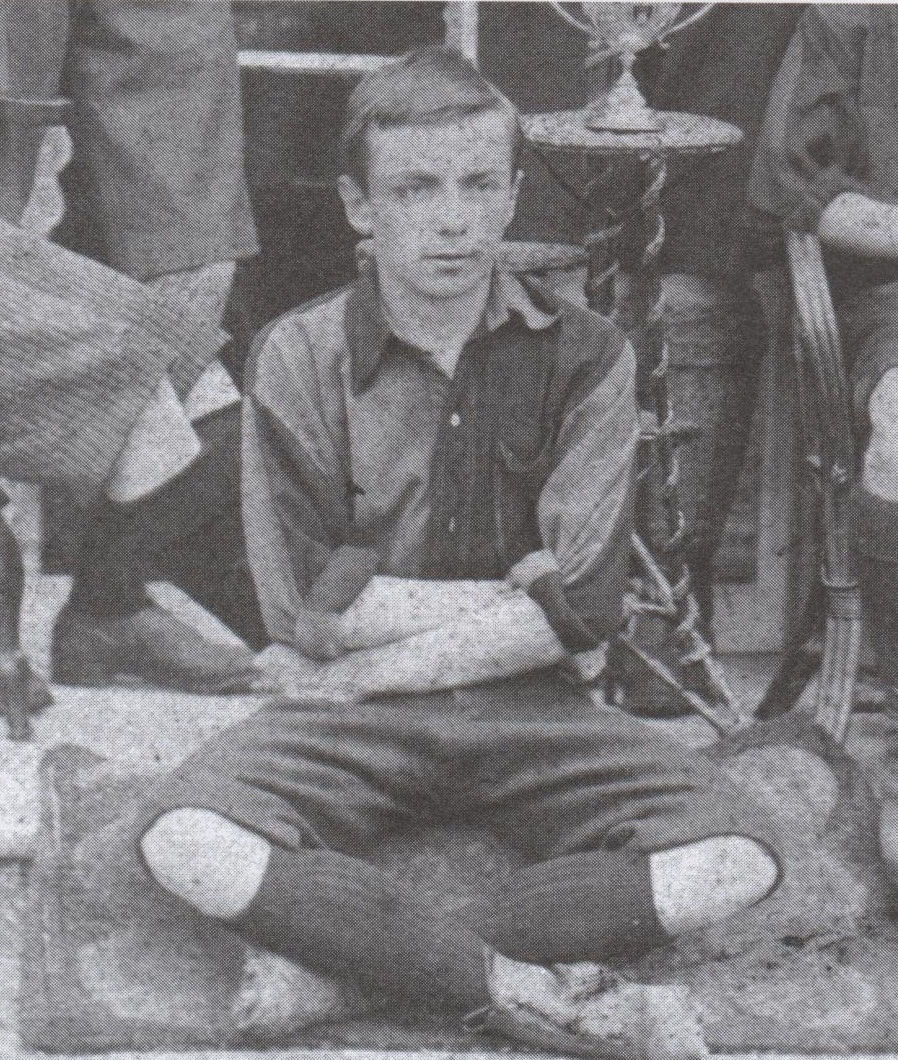
Miller in the St Mary's side of 1893–94

When he returned to Brazil in 1894, Miller brought two footballs and a set of Hampshire FA rules in his suitcase. Miller was instrumental in setting up the football team of the São Paulo Athletic Club (SPAC) and the Liga Paulista, the first football league in Brazil. With Miller as striker SPAC won the first three championships in 1902, 1903 and 1904.

By 1906, Miller was playing in goal and as such participated in SPAC's heaviest defeat, 9–1 to Sport Club Internacional of São Paulo (not to be confused with Sport Club Internacional). After the result, SPAC resigned from the league as did Miller from its directorate. SPAC eventually came back in 1907, even winning the 1911 title, and continued competing in the Campeonato Paulista until 1912, when it withdrew from official competitions.

It was Miller who suggested the name to the first president of Sport Club Corinthians Paulista.

== Personal life ==
Miller worked at the São Paulo Railway Company, becoming the Royal Mail's agent and the acting British vice-consul in 1904. He invested in the construction of garden suburbs in São Paulo, designed by Barry Parker and Raymond Unwin, profiting considerably.

In January 1906, he married the renowned pianist Antonietta Rudge, with whom he had two children, Carlos (b. 1907) and Helena (b. 1909). In the late 1920s the couple split and Antonietta moved in with the poet Menotti Del Picchia.

In 1939, on perhaps his last return to England, he was nearly killed in the first IRA bombing on the mainland; his daughter stopped to window shop just seconds before the bomb went off on the steps to the nearby underground station.

He continued to play cricket and golf in later life. He died on 30 June 1953 in São Paulo, and is buried in the Protestant cemetery there.

The square adjacent to the main entrance of Paulo Machado de Carvalho Stadium (Pacaembu Stadium), the historical São Paulo City owned stadium, is named after him (Praça Charles Miller).

== Honours ==
São Paulo Athletic Club

- Campeonato Paulista: 1902, 1903, 1904

== See also ==
- Oscar Cox
- Henry Welfare

== Sources ==
- Lacey, Josh (2007) God Is Brazilian: Charles Miller, the Man Who Brought Football To Brazil. NPI Media Group. ISBN 0-7524-3414-4
