= Guiomar Novaes =

Brazilian pianist (1895–1979)

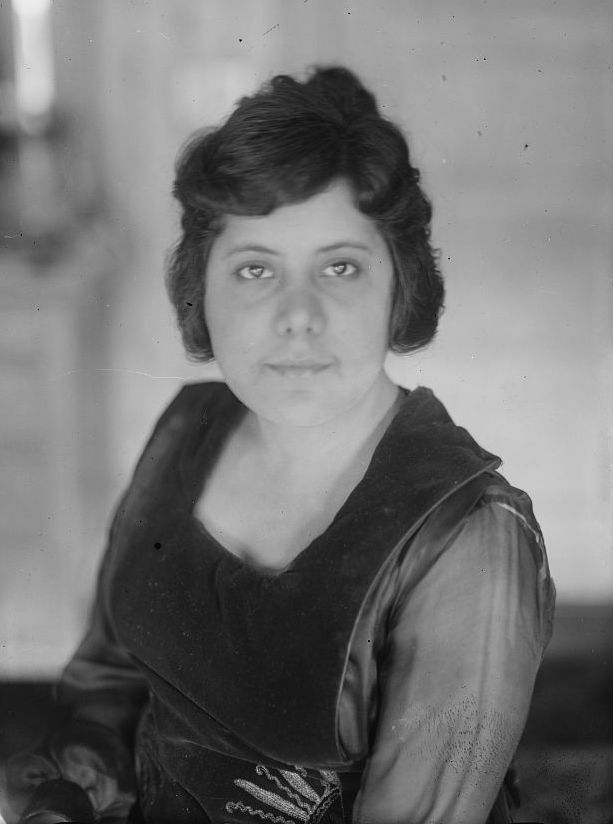
- Novaes in 1919
- Born: February 28, 1895; São João da Boa Vista
- Died: March 7, 1979 (aged 84); São Paulo

Guiomar Novaes (February 28, 1895 – March 7, 1979) was a Brazilian pianist known for individuality of tone and phrasing, singing line, and a subtle and nuanced approach to her interpretations.

== Biography ==
Born in São João da Boa Vista, São Paulo state as one of the youngest children in a very large family, she studied with Antonietta Rudge Miller and Luigi Chiafarelli before she was accepted as a pupil of Isidor Philipp at the Conservatoire de Paris in 1909. That year there were two vacancies for foreign students at the Conservatoire—and 387 applicants. Novaes played for a jury that included Debussy, Fauré, Moszkowski and Widor. Her pieces were the Paganini–Liszt Etude in E, Chopin's A-flat Ballade and Schumann's Carnaval. She won first place. Debussy wrote a letter in which he reports his amazement about the little Brazilian girl who came to the platform and, forgetting about public and jury, played with tremendous beauty and complete absorption.

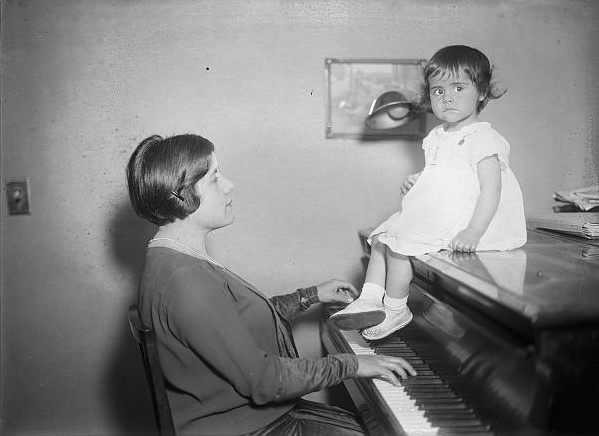
Guiomar Novaes with her daughter Anna Maria Pinto, c. 1924

Novaes' technique and musical interpretations may have already been fully formed by the time she reached Paris. One of her first pieces for Philipp was Beethoven's Les Adieux Sonata. Philipp said she played the second movement much too fast and suggested that she repeat it at a slower tempo. Novaes thought for a moment, then replayed with some differences in detail but at exactly the same tempo. This happened several times. Philipp finally gave up, saying later, "Even at that age, she had a mind of her own." Philipp later considered her one of his greatest students.

By the end of 1910, Novaes was a concert veteran. She made her official debut with the Chatelet Orchestra under Gabriel Pierné. She also played under Sir Henry Wood in England and on tour in Italy, Switzerland and Germany. Returning to Brazil at the start of World War I, she made her U.S. debut in Aeolian Hall in New York City in 1915. She was still only 19. Richard Aldrich of The New York Times dubbed her "a musician by the grace of God." Pitts Sanborn in the Boston Globe called her "the young genius of the piano." Dubbed "the Paderewska of the Pampas," she continued playing in the United States frequently, mostly in New York. In 1922 she married Octavio Pinto, a civil engineer who was also a pianist and composer. Novaes performed for the Peabody Mason Concert series in 1954. Through the 1960s she came to New York every December for a single concert at Carnegie Hall. Her final concert appearance in New York was at Hunter College in 1972.

Novaes had a stroke on January 31, 1979. She died in São Paulo, Brazil on March 7, 1979.

== Style ==
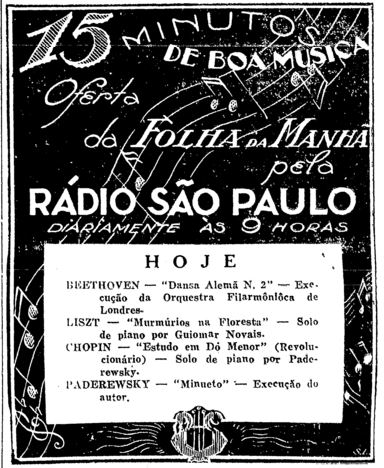
1943 advertisement for a radio program featuring Guiomar Novaes

Novaes commanded a very large repertoire in her early touring days, narrowing it in later life. Whatever she played, she played with an aristocratic approach, a perpetually singing line and complete spontaneity. Her natural approach to the keyboard was part of her appeal. Because of her relaxed, effortless nature at the keyboard, she was one of the few pianists about whom it seemed the instrument was a welded extension of her arms and fingers. The tone and subtlety of her tone recalled the great Romantic pianists of previous generations. Her technique was supple, with no striving for effect.

At all times her playing was intensely poetic. Harold C. Schonberg recalls in his book The Great Pianists that her performance of the Schumann concerto under the direction of André Cluytens in the late 1950s "was strikingly reminiscent of Josef Hofmann's [performances]. It had much the same suppleness, tonal subtlety and unswerving rhythm." Like Hofmann, she never played a piece quite the same way twice. Each time she brought to it a slightly different point of view; each time, the new approach seemed inevitable and perfectly natural. In his obituary of Novaes in The New York Times dated 7 March 1979, Schonberg stated: "The sheer beauty of her playing managed to transcend any other considerations; it was its own reward. There may have been more monumental pianists, more intellectual pianists, but it is hard to think of a pianist whose playing gave as much sheer pleasure as that of Guiomar Novaes."

David Dubal writes in The Art of the Piano that her playing was "first and always personalized. She delighted in details, leaving one wondering why others never saw or savored them. Even at capricious moments, she had that marvelous and indispensable trait of a great interpreter -- the power to convince. In whatever she touched there was a feeling of intimacy, and it was Chopin she touched most."

Guiomar Novaes on the cover of Ariel - Musical Culture Magazine

== Legacy ==
Novaes was particularly renowned for her interpretations of Chopin and Schumann, which were full of nuances and insights. She left a variety of recordings, including 78s from the 1920s and 1940s (she was not recorded during the 1930s) that have been collected on two CDs by APR.

Later, and especially during the 1950s, she recorded mostly for Vox, producing a recording of Beethoven's Piano Concerto No. 4, with Otto Klemperer and the Vienna Symphony Orchestra, that is highly rated by musicians and critics. She also recorded works for piano and orchestra by Mozart, Schumann, Grieg, and Falla. The noted Brazilian Chopin specialist Nelson Freire says that he was deeply influenced by Novaes' recording of Chopin's Second Piano Concerto with Klemperer, which he first heard at age 14 and regards as an ideal to strive for.

Her mid-century recordings of concertos, encore pieces, and Chopin solo works have been reissued by Vox on CD. A 3-CD set of the last-named contains the etudes (Op. 10 and Op. 25), 20 nocturnes, and the B-flat minor Piano Sonata No. 2 ("Funeral March"). Most of her highly regarded Schumann recordings were released on CD in 2009 by the label Musical Concepts. At Philipp's urging, she recorded a set of Mendelssohn's Songs Without Words, which he said were "unduly neglected." These have not yet officially been released on CD, nor have her Debussy recordings.

== Bibliography ==
- Methuen-Campbell, James, ed. Stankey Sadie, The New Grove Dictionary of Music and Musicians, Second Edition, 20 vols. (London: Macmillan, 2001). ISBN 1-56159-239-0.
- Schonberg, Harold C., The Great Pianists (New York: Simon & Schuster, 1987, 1963). ISBN 0-671-64200-6.
