= Cléber Alves =

Brazilian footballer (born 1986)

Personal information
- Full name: Cléber Rodrigo Alves
- Date of birth: 15 July 1986 (age 40)
- Place of birth: Limeira, Brazil
- Height: 1.88 m (6 ft 2 in)
- Position: Goalkeeper

Youth career
- 2002–2004: Portuguesa
- 2004–2007: Atlético Sorocaba

Senior career*
Years	Team	Apps	(Gls)
2008–2013	Mogi Mirim	0	(0)
2012–2013	→ Rio Claro (loan)	0	(0)
2013	Treze	4	(0)
2014	Rio Claro	0	(0)
2014	Vila Nova	32	(0)
2015	Rio Branco-SP	0	(0)
2016	Capivariano	0	(0)
2016	Rio Claro	0	(0)
2017	Barretos	0	(0)
2018	São Bento	0	(0)
2019	Brasil de Pelotas	0	(0)
2020	Primavera	15	(0)
2021	Marília	17	(0)
2021	São Bento	9	(0)
- * Club domestic league appearances and goals

Cléber Rodrigo Alves (born 15 July 1986), commonly known as Cléber Alves is a Brazilian former footballer who played as a goalkeeper.

Having largely featured as a reserve keeper, he did play as first choice in 2014 Campeonato Brasileiro Série B for Vila Nova Futebol Clube, making 32 appearances in a season which ended in relegation. He first played in the Brazilian national league system in 2013, representing Treze in 2013 Campeonato Brasileiro Série C.
