= Luiz Hernane Barros De Carvalho =

Brazilian musician

Luiz Hernane Barros de Carvalho is a Brazilian cellist. He first started his studies on the piano in his home town in Mato Grosso. In Tatui he began his studies on the cello with Gretchen Miller and went to the Campinas University to study with Antonio Del Claro.

In Brazil he has played with several professional orchestras and was the winner of several competitions such as: Year revelation Prize in 1985 of the Sao Paulo State Culture Secretary, best Bach interpreter, best Brazilian music performer and was soloist with the São Paulo State Symphony Orchestra in 1988.

In 1989 he entered the Royal Conservatory of The Hague attending the cello class of Fred Pot, where he graduated in 1996. He continued his studies in America with Irene Sharp at the San Francisco Conservatory of Music and the Mannes School of Music in New York.

In the Netherlands, Luiz Hernane has attended Master-classes of Mstislav Rostropovich, Yo-Yo Ma, Natalia Gutman, Dimitri Ferschtman, Jean Decroos and in New York at Carnegie Hall with Isaac Stern.

As a teacher, he has worked at Sao Paulo State University, ULM and Tatui Conservatory and has traveled to Australia, South Africa, USA and several countries in Europe to play recitals, chamber music and solo concertos.

At the moment he is living in Amsterdam where he used to work as a Music Project Leader by the Music Centre the Netherlands (Muziek Center Nederland)

Has coordinated the Campos do Jordão International Music Festival.

Luiz Hernane terminated his career in may 2019 due to physical problems.
