= Trazendo a Arca =

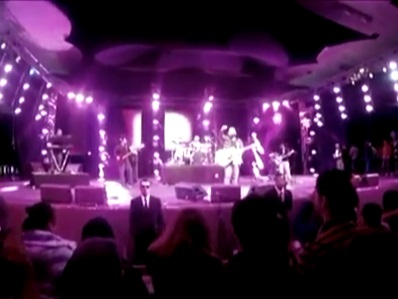
- Trazendo a Arca in Adora Heavens 2011, in Curitiba, Brazil.

Background information
- Origin: Nova Iguaçu, Brazil
- Genres: Gospel; Contemporary Christian music Contemporary worship music
- Years active: 2002–present
- Label: CanZion
- Members: Luiz Arcanjo, Ronald Fonseca, André Mattos, Deco Rodrigues and Isaac Ramos
- Past members: Davi Sacer and Verônica Sacer
- Website: Trazendo a Arca

Trazendo a Arca is a Christian band from Nova Iguaçu, Rio de Janeiro, Brazil.

== Biography ==
The group was formed in 2002 in the Church Ministério Apascentar. In 2003 they released the album entitled Restitution, which sold over a million copies, becoming the fourth CD of gospel music's best-selling Brazil. They sold about five million albums, participated in the Talent Trophy between 2005 and 2009. They released twelve albums, and four records on DVD. In 2007, the group split from the Church and the group's initial name "Toque no Altar" was variously called the current name. In September 2007 released an album recorded live in Japan, in 2008, recorded a DVD in Rio de Janeiro, and all food collected by the group were sent to poor municipalities in the state of Minas Gerais.

In 2011 they recorded their first DVD in the United States at Orlando, Florida, and was attended by three thousand people.

== Discography ==
=== Studio albums ===
Title	Details
Restituição	Released: November, 2003; Label: Toque no Altar Music; Format: CD, download digital
Deus de Promessas	Released: March, 2005; Label: Toque no Altar Music; Format: CD, download digital
Olha pra Mim	Released: May 1, 2006; Label: Toque no Altar Music; Format: CD, download digital
Marca da Promessa	Released: June, 2007; Label: Marcas da Promessa Distribuição; Format: CD, download digital
Pra Tocar no Manto	Released: June, 2009; Label: Marcas da Promessa Distribuição; Format: CD, download digital
Salmos e Cânticos Espirituais	Released: December, 2009; Label: Dunamy's; Format: CD, download digital
Entre a Fé e a Razão	Released: December, 2010; Label: Graça Music; Format: CD, download digital
Na Casa dos Profetas	Released: November 25, 2012; Label: CanZion Brasil; Format: CD, download digital

=== Live albums ===
Title	Details
Toque no Altar	Released: October, 2003; Label: Toque no Altar Music; Format: CD, download digital
Deus de Promessas Ao Vivo	Released: January, 2007; Label: Toque no Altar Music; Format: CD, download digital
Ao Vivo no Japão	Released: September 11, 2007; Label: Marcas da Promessa Distribuição; Format: CD, download digital
Ao Vivo no Maracanãzinho - Volume 1	Released: December, 2009; Label: Dunamy's; Format: CD, download digital
Ao Vivo no Maracanãzinho - Volume 2	Released: December, 2009; Label: Dunamy's; Format: CD, download digital
Live in Orlando	Released: March, 2012; Label: Graça Music; Format: CD, download digital
Habito no Abrigo	Released: November 20, 2015; Label: Sony Music; Format: CD, download digital

=== Video albums ===
Title	Details
Toque no Altar e Restituição	Released: April, 2006; Label: Toque no Altar Music; Format: CD, download digital
Deus de Promessas Ao Vivo	Released: December, 2006; Label: Toque no Altar Music; Format: CD, download digital
Ao Vivo no Maracanãzinho	Released: December, 2008; Label: Marcas da Promessa Distribuição; Format: CD, download digital
Live in Orlando	Released: March, 2012; Label: Graça Music; Format: CD, download digital

=== Compilations ===
- 2012: Trazendo a Arca Deluxe Collection
