= Antonietta Rudge =

Brazilian pianist (1885–1974)

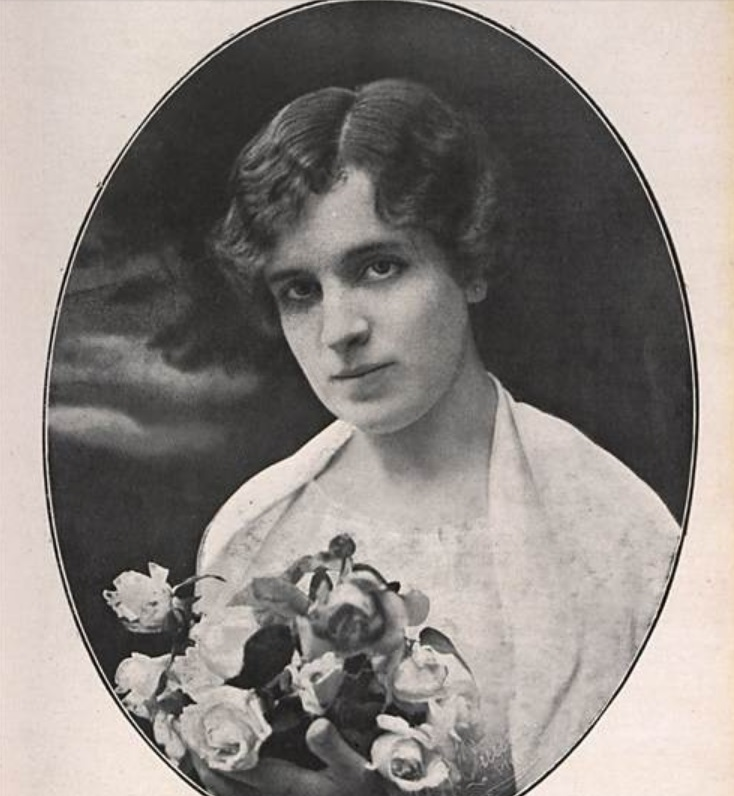
- Antonietta Rudge, in 1924
- Born: 13 June 1885; São Paulo, Brazil
- Died: 14 July 1974 (aged 89); São Paulo, Brazil
- Occupation: Pianist

Antonietta Rudge (13 June 1885 – 14 July 1974) was a Brazilian pianist of international fame.

== Early life ==
Rudge was born in 1885, in São Paulo, to Anna Emília da Silva Telles and João Henrique Rudge. She was a descendant of the English settler John Rudge, from Stroud, who came to Brazil in the early 19th century.

Rudge demonstrated a talent for playing the piano since she was four years old. Her parents hired her a private teacher, the Frenchman Gabriel Giraudon. She debuted in a public piano concert in 1892, at age seven, at the Casa Levy hall.

She performed at São Paulo clubs, such as Clube Internacional and Clube Germânia, playing works by Beethoven. That time, Rudge was a pupil of Luigi Chiaffarelli. Rudge's repertoire also included Mozart's concertos, Chopin's sonatas and nocturnes, Bach's The Well-Tempered Clavier, Schumann, and Liszt's Hungarian Rhapsody no.6.

== Career ==
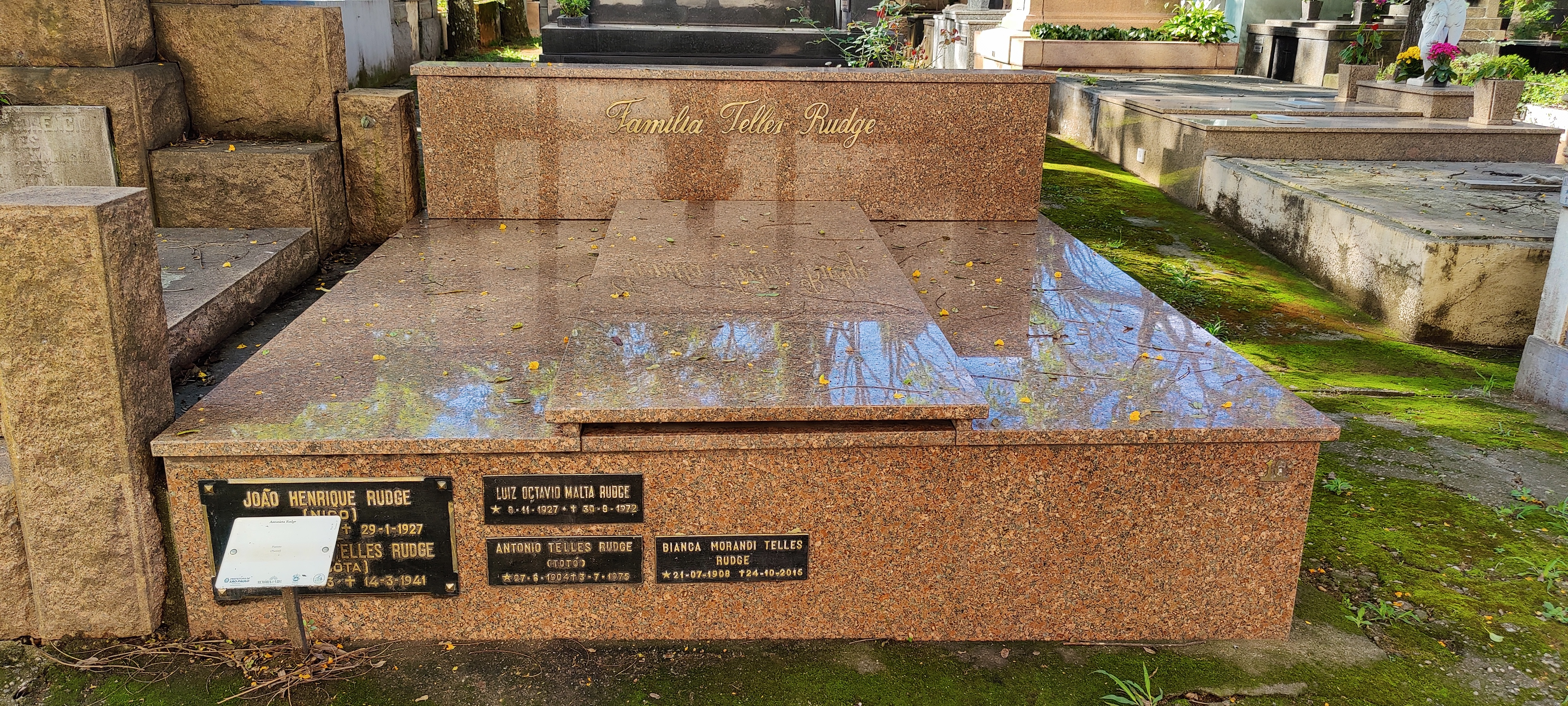
Family tomb of Antonietta Rudge at Cemitério da Consolação in São Paulo (2022)

In 1907, Rudge started a two-year European tour, playing in England, Germany and France. Her performances were acclaimed, garnering her praise from artists like Isidor Philipp and Charles Widor. She toured Europe again in 1911.

Back to Brazil, she did concerts in Brazilian capitals. In a concert in Rio de Janeiro in 1918, Rudge and Guiomar Novaes were praised by Arthur Rubinstein, who called them "brilliant".

Rudge played less frequently in public, dedicating herself to musical education. In 1927 she founded the Musical Conservatory in Santos.

In the 1930s and 1940s she recorded some 78 rpm discs with performances of Wagner's Liebestod and Chopin's Barcarolle. Those recordings were reissued in 2000 in a CD.

Rudge died on 14 July 1974.

== Personal life ==
In 1905, Antonietta Rudge married Charles Miller, known for introducing the game of football association to Brazil with whom she had two children. They divorced in 1925, and she started a relationship with Modernist poet Menotti del Picchia.
