= Flávio Venturini =

Brazilian singer and songwriter (born 1949)

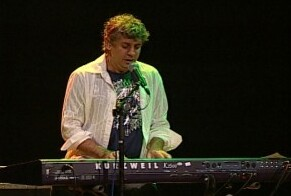

Background information
- Born: Flávio Hugo Venturini; July 23, 1949 (age 77); Belo Horizonte, Minas Gerais, Brazil
- Genres: MPB; pop; progressive rock
- Occupations: Composer, songwriter
- Instruments: Vocals, keyboards, piano, acoustic guitar
- Years active: 1974–present
- Formerly of: O Terço; 14 Bis

Flávio Hugo Venturini (born July 23, 1949) is a Brazilian singer and songwriter.

== Biography ==
Venturini took an early interest in music at the age of three. When he was fifteen he began his musical training. His first musical instrument was the accordion. After his father presented him with a piano, he started his studies at the Fundação de Educação Artística in Belo Horizonte, where he studied musical perception and piano.

Venturini was revealed in the 1970s by the musical movement Clube da Esquina, together with Milton Nascimento, Lô Borges, Beto Guedes, among others. Between 1974 and 1976, he was a member of the musical group O Terço. In 1979 found the group 14 Bis, by which he made success between 1980 and 1989, when he left the group to begin a solo career.

Among his main successes, as a composer or performer, are "Todo Azul do Mar", "Linda Juventude", "Planeta Sonho", "Nascente", "Nuvens", "Espanhola" (partnership with Guarabyra, a member of the duo Sá & Guarabyra) and "Mais Uma Vez" (with Renato Russo, the formal founder and leader of Legião Urbana); originally recorded and performed by 14 Bis in 1987 and re-released in 2003.

Notable songs from Venturini's solo career include "Princesa", "Besame", "Nascente", and "Céu de Santo Amaro".

== Discography ==
=== Clube da Esquina ===
- 1978 – Clube da Esquina 2

=== O Terço ===
- 1974 – Criaturas da Noite (Underground/Copacabana)
- 1975 – Casa Encantada (Underground/Copacabana)
- 2007 – O Terço Ao Vivo (Som Livre)

=== 14 Bis ===
- 1979 – 14 Bis
- 1980 – 14 Bis II
- 1981 – Espelho das Águas
- 1982 – Além Paraíso
- 1983 – A Idade da Luz
- 1985 – A Nave Vai
- 1987 – Sete
- 1987 – Ao Vivo

=== Solo ===
- 1982 – Nascente (EMI/Odeon)
- 1984 – O Andarilho (EMI/Odeon)
- 1990 – Cidade Veloz (Chorus/Som Livre)
- 1992 – Ao Vivo (Som Livre)
- 1994 – Noites com Sol (Velas)
- 1996 – Beija-Flor (Velas)
- 1997 – Flavio Venturini e Toninho Horta no Circo Voador (Dubas)
- 1998 – Trem Azul (EMI/Odeon)
- 1999 – Linda Juventude (Som Livre) (CD/DVD released)
- 2003 – Porque Não Tinhamos Bicicletas (Trilhos)
- 2005 – Luz Viva (Trilhos)
- 2005 – Aquela Estrela (Trilhos)
- 2006 – Canção Sem Fim (Trilhos)
- 2009 – Não Se Apague Esta Noite (Trilhos/Som Livre) (CD/DVD released)
- 2013 – Venturini
