= Sá & Guarabyra =

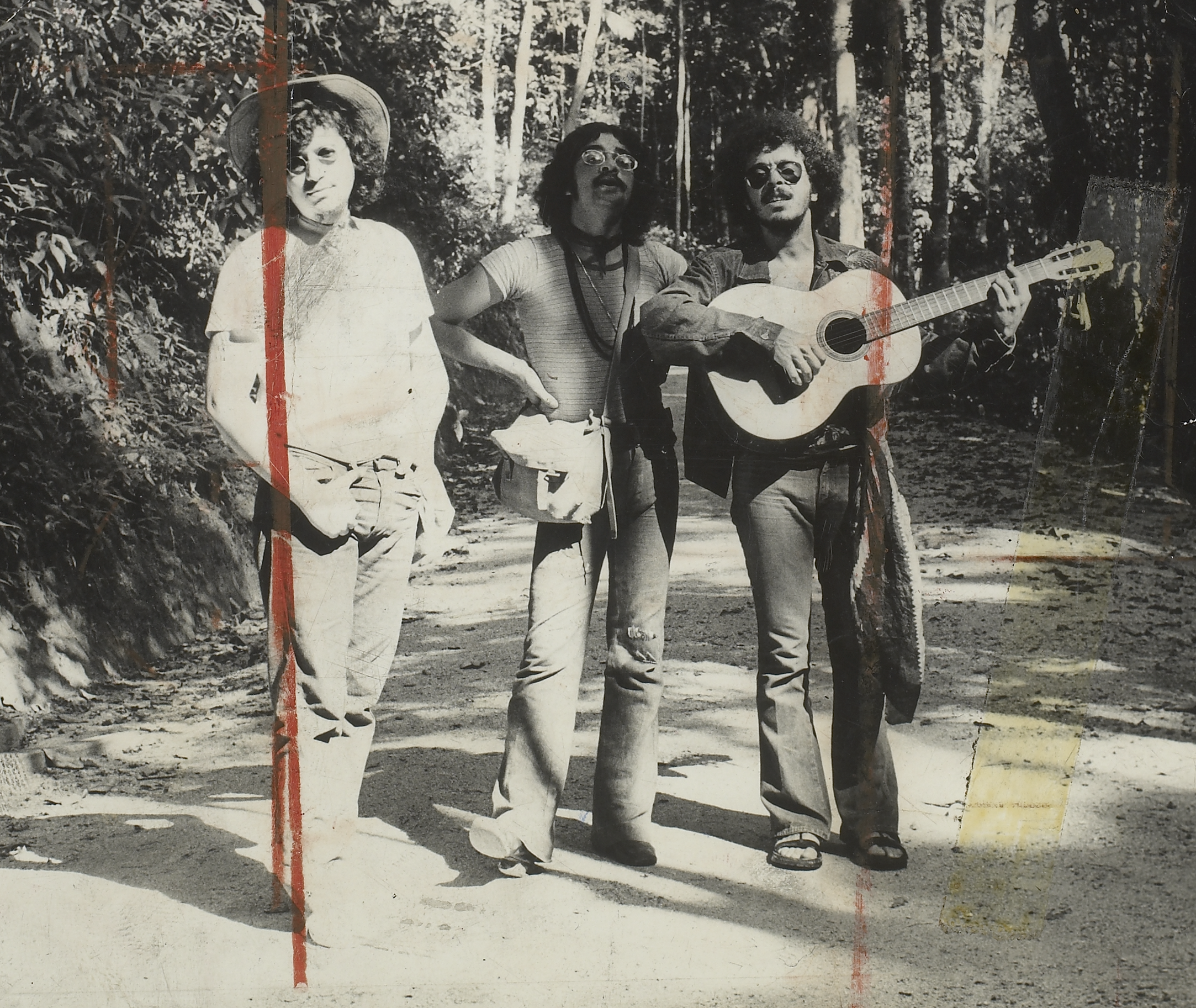
- Sá, Rodrix & Guarabyra in 1972

Background information
- Also known as: Sá, Rodrix & Guarabyra (1971–1973; 2001–2009)
- Origin: Rio de Janeiro, Brazil
- Genres: Folk rock, sertanejo
- Years active: 1971–present
- Labels: Odeon Records, RCA Records, Som Livre
- Members: Luiz Carlos Sá; Guttemberg Guarabyra
- Past members: Zé Rodrix

Sá & Guarabyra, formerly Sá, Rodrix & Guarabyra, is a Brazilian folk rock duo hailing from Rio de Janeiro. They are famous for mixing rock music with Caipira music, in a style they would call "rural rock."

== History ==
The duo, initially a trio, was formed in 1971 by Luiz Carlos Sá, Guttemberg Guarabyra and José Rodrigues Trindade (better known as Zé Rodrix), who had recently left his previous band Som Imaginário. Their first studio album, Passado, Presente e Futuro, was released in the following year via Odeon Records to critical acclaim, and tours around Rio would come afterwards. In 1973 the trio reached higher fame after composing a jingle for a Pepsi commercial, "Só Tem Amor Quem Tem Amor pra Dar"; however, Rodrix, saying that he was tired of so much touring and performances, would part ways with Sá and Guarabyra shortly afterwards, and began a solo career. Sá and Guarabyra would then remain as a duo.

In 1982, the duo partaked at the Festival de Música Popular Brasileira with the song "Dona". "Dona" would be covered by pop rock group Roupa Nova, and after Roupa Nova's version appeared in the soundtrack of the popular telenovela Roque Santeiro, it became one of the most played songs in the radios in 1985. Numerous other songs by the duo would feature on the telenovela's soundtrack as well. They also collaborated with Flávio Venturini for their song "Espanhola", that was co-written by him.

In 2001, Zé Rodrix rejoined Sá and Guarabyra for a show promoting the band's 30th anniversary, and would stay with them until his death in 2009.

== Discography ==
=== With Zé Rodrix ===
- 1972: Passado, Presente e Futuro
- 1973: Terra
- 2001: Outra Vez na Estrada (live album)
- 2009: Amanhã

=== Without Zé Rodrix ===
- 1974: Nunca
- 1975: Cadernos de Viagem
- 1977: Pirão de Peixe com Pimenta
- 1979: Quatro
- 1982: Dez Anos Juntos (live album)
- 1984: Paraíso Agora
- 1986: Harmonia
- 1988: Cartas, Canções e Palavras
- 1990: Vamos por Aí
- 1994: Sá & Guarabyra
- 1997: Rio-Bahia
- 1999: Orquestra Sinfônica de Americana ao Vivo (live album)
