= 2nd Brazilian Music Awards =

1989 Brazilian Music Awards

- Date: 25 April 1989
- Location: Copacabana Palace; Rio de Janeiro, Rio de Janeiro, Brazil
- Hosted by: Chico Anysio

Highlights
- Most awards: Cazuza (3)
- Most nominations: Cazuza (7)

The 2nd Brazilian Music Awards (Portuguese: 2.° Prêmio da Música Brasileira), known as the Sharp Music Awards (Portuguese: Prêmio Sharp de Música), took place on 25 April 1989, at the Copacabana Palace's Golden Room in Rio de Janeiro. Sponsored by Sharp Corporation, it recognized the Brazilian music of 1988. The ceremony was hosted by Chico Anysio. Dorival Caymmi was honored at the ceremony. Cazuza was the most nominated and awarded artist, winning three out of his seven nominations.

== Winners and nominees ==
The nominees were announced on 19 April 1989. Winners are listed first and highlighted in boldface.

=== Brazilian popular music (MPB) ===
**Best Male Singer**: **Nelson Gonçalves**; Emílio Santiago; Milton Gonçalves	**Best Female Singer**: **Nana Caymmi**; Joyce Moreno; Leny Andrade
**Best Group**: **14 Bis**	**Best Female New Artist**: **Ná Ozzetti**; Rosa Emília
**Best Arranger**: **Gilson Peranzzetta**; Toninho Horta	**Best Song**: **"É" – Gonzaguinha**; **Gonzaguinha, songwriter**; "Tá Combinado" – Maria Bethânia
**Best Album**: **Miltons – Milton Nascimento**; Cartola – Bate Outra Vez – Various artists; Vinicius de Moraes – Preto Demais no Coração – Joyce Moreno

=== Children's ===
**Best Song**: **"A Noite do Castelo" – Grupo Rumo**; **Hélio Ziskind, songwriter**; "O Circo da Alegria" – Atchim & Espirro; "Bruxinha" – Turma do Balão Mágico	**Best Album**: **Quero Passear – Grupo Rumo**; Trem da Alegria – Trem da Alegria; A Nova Turma do Balão Mágico – Turma do Balão Mágico

=== Classical ===
**Best Album**
- **Villa-Lobos – Arthur Moreira Lima**

=== Instrumental ===
**Best Soloist**: **Baden Powell**; Egberto Gismonti; Hermeto Pascoal	**Best Group**: **Nó em Pingo d'Água**; Idriss Boudrioua Quinteto; Orquestra de Câmara de Blumenau
**Best Arranger**: **César Camargo Mariano**; Léo Gandelman; Marco Pereira	**Best Album**: **Guerra Fria – Cama de Gato**; Violão em Seresta – Baden Powell; Piano Brasileiro – Miguel Proença

=== Pop/Rock ===
**Best Male Singer**: **Ed Motta**; Cazuza; Lulu Santos	**Best Female Singer**: **Rita Lee**; Angela Ro Ro
**Best Group**: **Os Paralamas do Sucesso**; Joelho de Porco; Luni	**Best Male New Artist**: **Ed Motta**; Fábio Fonseca; João Fígar
**Best Arranger**: **Portinho**; Ari Mendes; Léo Gandelman	**Best Song**: **"Brasil" – Gal Costa**; **Cazuza, George Israel and Nilo Romero, songwriters**; "Faz Parte do Meu Show" – Cazuza; Cazuza and Renato Ladeira, songwriters; "Ideologia" – Cazuza; Cazuza and Frejat, songwriters
**Best Album**: **Ideologia – Cazuza**; Ed Motta & Conexão Japeri – Ed Motta e Conexão Japeri; Zona Zen – Rita Lee and Roberto de Carvalho

=== Popular Song ===
**Best Male Singer**: **Tim Maia**; Jerry Adriani; Wando	**Best Female Singer**: **Sandra de Sá**; Cláudia Telles; Rosana
**Best Group**: **Roupa Nova**; Placa Luminosa; The Fevers	**Best Male New Artist**: **Ricardo Bomba**; Junno
**Best Female New Artist**: **Solange**; Thyna Ramos	**Best Arranger**: **Eduardo Assad**; Lincoln Olivetti
**Best Song**: **"Cabeça Feita" – Tim Maia**; **Willie and Dom Mita, songwriters**; "Tempo" – Sandra de Sá; "Carinhos" – Tim Maia	**Best Album**: **Sandra de Sá – Sandra de Sá**; Alma Negra – Carlinhos Trumpete, Lady Zu, Luís Vagner, Tony Bizarro e Tony Tornado; Vício Fatal – Rosana

=== Regional ===
**Best Male Singer**: **Sérgio Reis**; Dominguinhos; Genésio Tocantins	**Best Female Singer**: **Carmen Silva**; Fátima Leão; Margareth Menezes
**Best Group**: **Obina Shok**; Olodum; Os Monarcas	**Best Male New Artist**: **Genésio Tocantins**; Messias Lima; Ricardo Chaves
**Best Female New Artist**: **Fátima Leão**; Margareth Menezes	**Best Arranger**: **Chiquinho do Acordeom**; Rildo Hora; Sivuca
**Best Song**: **"Remelexo" – Dominguinhos**; **Dominguinhos and Nando Cordel, songwriters**; "Forrobodó" – Genésio Tocantins; "Mulheres da Terra" – Pena Branca & Xavantinho	**Best Album**: **Aí Tem – Luiz Gonzaga**; Cantoria 2 – Elomar, Geraldo Azevedo, Vital Farias e Xangai; Gonzagão & Fagner – Fagner

=== Samba ===
**Best Male Singer**: **Roberto Ribeiro**; Martinho da Vila; Neguinho da Beija-Flor	**Best Female Singer**: **Alcione**; Beth Carvalho; Elza Soares
**Best Group**: **Fundo de Quintal**; Só Preto Sem Preconceito	**Best Male New Artist**: **Royce do Cavaco**
**Best Arranger**: **Geraldo Vespar**; Ivan Paulo; Rildo Hora	**Best Song**: **"Além da Razão" – Beth Carvalho**; **Luiz Carlos da Vila, Sombra and Sombrinha, songwriters**; "Sete Chaves" – Beth Carvalho; "Kizomba: A Festa da Raça" – Martinho da Vila
**Best Album**: **Festa da Raça – Martinho da Vila**; Alma do Brasil – Beth Carvalho; Roberto Ribeiro – Roberto Ribeiro

=== Special ===
**Song of the Year**: **"Brasil" – Gal Costa**; **Cazuza, George Israel and Nilo Romero, songwriters**; "Faz Parte do Meu Show" – Cazuza; Cazuza and Renato Ladeira, songwriters; "É" – Gonzaguinha; Gonzaguinha, songwriter	**Best Visual Project**: **Guerra Fria – Cama de Gato**; **OZ Desenhos & Associados, art director**; Por Diferentes Caminhos – Hermeto Pascoal; OZ Desenhos & Associados, art director; Quem Não Vive Tem Medo da Morte – Ney Matogrosso; Luiz Fernando Borges da Fonseca, art director
