= A Different Story (Deborah Blando album) =

Studio album by Deborah Blando
- Released: 19 November 1991
- Genres: Pop, rock
- Length: 35:35
- Label: Epic
- Producers: Eric Thorngren, Deborah Blando

Deborah Blando chronology
Alegria da Gente (1981)	A Different Story (1991)	Unicamente (1996)

Singles from A Different Story
- 1. "Boy (Why You Wanna Make Me Blue)" Released: 10 September 1991; 2. "Innocence" Released: 4 February 1992; 3. "Shame" Released: 30 June 1992; 4. "Decadence Avec Elegance" Released: 20 October 1992

Special edition cover
- A Different Story: Special Edition artwork

Singles from A Different Story: Special Edition
- 1. "A Maçã" Released: March 29, 1993; 2. "Merry-Go-Round" Released: September 8, 1993

Professional ratings
Review scores
Source	Rating
AllMusic	2/5 stars

A Different Story is the debut studio album by Brazilian singer Deborah Blando, released on November 19, 1991, by Epic Records. Its music consists of pop and dance pop tracks heavily influenced by Brazilian music genres. Originally, the album was to be recorded entirely in Portuguese, but after Blando signed to Epic Records, the album was recorded in English to appeal to a wider international audience.

== Background ==
The story before the production begins in 1989, when Deborah met singer Cyndi Lauper on tour in Rio de Janeiro and she decides to introduce her to her manager David Wolff, affiliated with Epic Records. Then, David introduced Deborah to Sony Music executives and she signs a contract to produce an album in Portuguese language. However, the record company decides to invest in a possible international career and it brings together a songwriting team committee to translating her songs previously ready in Portuguese to English, as "Innocence" and "Shame". In less than three months Deborah moved to New York and signs a contract with Sony International and North American Sony.

== Recording and composition ==
A Different Story was produced by Eric Thorngren, along with Andres Levin and Camus Celli and Blando herself.

As a commercial theme for a campaign for Coca-Cola (Diet Coke) in the summer of 1991, the song "Boy (Why You Wanna Make Me Blue)", produced by ET Thorngren, debuted as the first single from the album in the Top 10 the American Dance Chart months earlier. It is a Eurodance remake for "Girl (Why You Wanna Make Me Blue)", originally composed by the American duo Eddie Holland and Norman Whitfield for The Temptations, in 1964.

"Decadence Avec Elegance" came from the great success from Brazilian singer Lobão who had recorded five years earlier. Translated to English, Deborah's version has gathered pace and innovated as in the previous song, more focused on rock music. Music video was recorded in Olinda, with scenes of a live show held on the beach of Boa Viagem for an audience of over 80,000 people during the tour conducted by the Brazilian northeast states.

"Innocence", released as the second single overall, and the first single in Europe, is described as a synthesizer-dominated pop single, written by Blando at her apartment in Rio de Janeiro, originally in Portuguese, and then translated to English by Kit Hain, Larry Dvoskin and Thorngren. The prayer in the song's interlude is spoken by Blando's father, Pietro Blando. According to the Billboard magazine, the song spent 13 weeks at number one in Brazil.

"Blue Eyes Are Sensitive to the Light" was originally written by American singer Martika, and intended for the soundtrack to the film Arachnophobia. Blando's cover was inspired by the forró, a music genre of northeast Brazil, featuring an accordion played by grand master Oswaldinho do Acordeon, and supporting vocals of Elba Ramalho.

"Brasil/Aquarela do Brasil" is a tribute to the country by the same name. Sung in Portuguese, its music and lyrics combines elements of "Brasil" by Cazuza, and "Aquarela do Brasil", featuring Brazilian percussion and American-styled rock guitars.

== Re-release ==
Produced by David Wolff, the special edition of the album was aimed at reaching the Brazilian public with the promotion of some tracks exclusively recorded in Portuguese, after Deborah's debut on the world market. There are "A Maçã", former success of singer Raul Seixas from the album Novo Aeon (1975), and a new version of the song "Innocence", which presents the second verse in Portuguese. "Decadence Avec Elegance" also earned a second version with better-worked vocals.

== Track listing ==
No.	Title	Writer(s)	Length
1.	"Boy (Why You Wanna Make Me Blue)"	Edward Holland / Norman Whitfield	3:07
2.	"Shame"	Blando / Monique Dayan / Fred Nascimento	3:54
3.	"Innocence"	Blando / Kit Hain / Larry Dvoskin / E.T. Thorngren	4:15
4.	"Merry-Go-Round"	Evan Rogers / Carl Sturken	4:11
5.	"Other People's Houses"	Blando / Richard Orange	3:54
6.	"Decadence Avec Elegance"	Lobão / Blando / Kit Hain	3:26
7.	"Blue Eyes Are Sensitive To The Light"	Billy Steinberg / Tom Kelly / Martika	4:31
8.	"Brasil/Aquarela do Brasil"	Cazuza / George Israel / Nilo Romero / Ary Barroso	3:54
9.	"Walk On Fire"	Monique Dayan / Blando	4:12

A Different Story – Japanese Edition
No.	Title	Writer(s)	Length
1.	"Boy (Why You Wanna Make Me Blue)"	Edward Holland / Norman Whitfield	3:07
2.	"Shame"	Blando / Monique Dayan / Fred Nascimento	3:54
3.	"Innocence"	Blando / Kit Hain / Larry Dvoskin / E.T. Thorngren	4:15
4.	"Merry-Go-Round"	Evan Rogers / Carl Sturken	4:11
5.	"Other People's Houses"	Blando / Richard Orange	3:54
6.	"Decadence Avec Elegance"	Lobão / Blando / Kit Hain	3:26
7.	"Blue Eyes Are Sensitive To The Light"	Billy Steinberg / Tom Kelly / Martika	4:31
8.	"Brasil/Aquarela do Brasil"	Cazuza / George Israel / Nilo Romero / Ary Barroso	3:54
9.	"Walk On Fire"	Monique Dayan / Blando	4:12
10.	"Lazy Heart"	Blando / Marga Roman / Andres Levin / Camus Mare Celli	3:43

A Different Story – Special Edition
No.	Title	Writer(s)	Length
1.	"Decadence Avec Elegance"	Lobão / Blando / Kit Hain	3:26
2.	"Innocence"	Blando / Kit Hain / Larry Dvoskin / E.T. Thorngren	4:15
3.	"Merry-Go-Round"	Evan Rogers / Carl Sturken	4:11
4.	"Other People's Houses"	Blando / Richard Orange	3:54
5.	"Boy (Why You Wanna Make Me Blue)"	Edward Holland / Norman Whitfield	3:07
6.	"Brasil/Aquarela do Brasil"	Cazuza / George Israel / Nilo Romero / Ary Barroso	3:54
7.	"You Really Got Me"	Ray Davies	3:47
8.	"A Maçã"	Seixas / Paulo Coelho / Marcelo Motta	3:46
9.	"Lazy Heart"	Blando / Marga Roman / Andres Levin / Camus Mare Celli	3:43
10.	"Shame"	Blando / Monique Dayan / Fred Nascimento	3:54
11.	"Blue Eyes Are Sensitive To The Light"	Billy Steinberg / Tom Kelly / Martika	4:31
12.	"Walk On Fire"	Monique Dayan / Blando	4:12
