= Maior Abandonado =

Studio album by Barão Vermelho
- Released: 1984
- Recorded: July 1984
- Genre: Brazilian rock blues rock pop rock hard rock
- Length: 35:09
- Label: Som Livre
- Producer: Ezequiel Neves; Barão Vermelho

Barão Vermelho chronology
Barão Vermelho 2 (1983)	Maior Abandonado (1984)	Declare Guerra (1986)

Professional ratings
Review scores
Source	Rating
Allmusic	4.5/5 stars

Maior Abandonado (transl. Abandoned Adult) is the third album by Brazilian rock band Barão Vermelho, released in 1984. It is their most critically acclaimed and generally considered their best album. It contains their biggest hit "Bete Balanço". This was the last album with singer and main lyricist Cazuza, who left the band in 1985.

== Cover ==
The front and back covers of the album mark the band's first collaboration with artist Felipe Taborda. The pictures, including those from the booklet, were taken by Frederico Mendes; one of them, consisting of a gallery of five pictures in which each member appears entirely or partially, was inspired by a work of his favorite photographer, Richard Avedon.

The cover shows the band members in front of a low-budget hotel called "Loves House", which was actually a brothel. To the right of the band, a transvestite could be seen by a wall.

The back cover features a picture of the band being searched by the police, with the same transvestite from the front cover to their left, smiling. The officers involved hid their IDs in order not to be punished for taking part in the simulation. On the wall right above the band, a graffiti that reads "Faço da minha vida um cenário da minha tristeza" ("I make of my life a scenery for my sadness") can be seen; it is signed by Careca (lit. "bald").

== Track listing ==
1. "Maior Abandonado" (Of Age And Abandoned)
2. "Baby Suporte" (Baby Support)
3. "Sem Vergonha" (Shameless)
4. "Você Se Parece Com Todo Mundo" (You Look Like Everyone)
5. "Milagres" (Miracles)
6. "Não Amo Ninguém" (I Don't Love Anybody)
7. "Por Que A Gente É Assim?" (Why Are We Like This?)
8. "Narciso" (Narcissus)
9. "Nós" (We)
10. "Dolorosa" (Painful)
11. "Bete Balanço"

== Personnel ==
- Cazuza: lead vocals
- Roberto Frejat: guitar
- Maurício Barros: keyboards
- Dé: bass
- Guto Goffi: drums and percussion
