= Carnaval (Barão Vermelho album) =

Studio album by Barão Vermelho
- Released: 1988
- Genre: Brazilian rock blues rock pop rock hard rock
- Label: WEA
- Producer: Barão Vermelho; Ezequiel Neves (co-production); Paulo Junqueiro (co-production)

Barão Vermelho chronology
Rock'n Geral (1987)	Carnaval (1988)	Barão ao Vivo (1989)

Professional ratings
Review scores
Source	Rating
AllMusic	3/5 stars

Carnaval is the sixth album by Brazilian rock band Barão Vermelho, released in 1988. It's the third album with Roberto Frejat as vocalist and the final album with bassist Dé Palmeira. The album sold better than the previous two albums and it generated the hit "Pense e Dance" (Think and Dance).

== Track listing ==
1. "Lente" (Lens)
2. "Pense e Dance" (Think and Dance)
3. "Não Me Acabo" (I Don't Get Wasted)
4. "O Que Você Faz à Noite?" (What Do You Do at Night?)
5. "Nunca Existiu Pecado" (There's Never Been Sin)
6. "Como um Furacão" (Like a Hurricane)
7. "Quem Me Escuta" (Who Listens to Me)
8. "Selvagem" (Savage)
9. "Carnaval" (Carnival)
10. "Rock da Descerebração" (Brainlessness Rock)

== Personnel ==
Barão Vermelho

- Frejat – vocals, acoustic and electric guitars
- Dé Palmeira – bass
- Guto Goffi – drums

Additional musicians

- Ronaldo Barcelos – background vocals (2, 4, 6, 8)
- Jordão Barreto – organ on "O Que Você Faz à Noite", piano (4, 6)
- Iuri Cunha – keyboards on "Pense e Dance"
- Léo Gandelman – alto saxophone
- Jurema and Jussara Lourenço, Zé Roberto – background vocals (2, 6, 8)
- Fernando Magalhães – guitars
- Peninha – percussion
- Zé Carlos – tenor saxophone
- Serginho – trombone
- Bidinho, Don Harris – trumpet
