= Giuseppe G. Ruisi =

Italian Supreme Court judge (1907–1975)

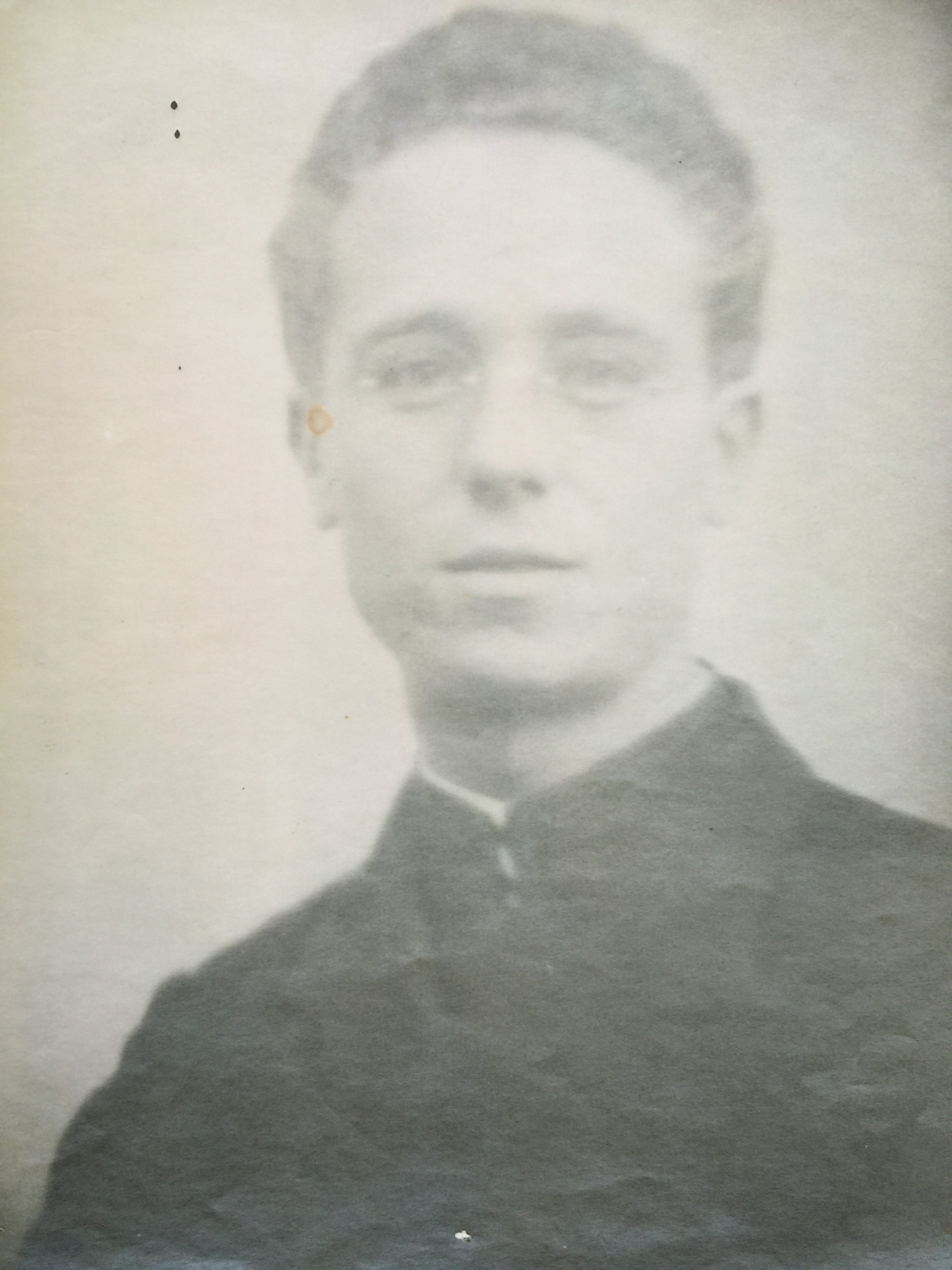

Supreme Court Judge

Personal details
- Born: November 20, 1907
- Died: 27 January 1975 (aged 67) Bologna, Italy

Giuseppe G. Ruisi (November 20, 1907–January 27, 1975) was an Italian Supreme Court Judge.

== Career ==
Ruisi first studied in Sicily at the College of Christ Jesuits (at Mussomeli). His studies were paid for by an unknown benefactor. He later graduated with a degree in philosophy at the University of Palermo and then began his career as a teacher, starting in Malta and then moving to Sant'Agata di Militello (Messina). Ruisi then re-enrolled at the University of Palermo and graduated with a degree in law. In 1940, during World War II, he volunteered for military service, but Italy needed Judges and he was therefore turned down. Later Ruisi was a Magistrate in the Court of Bologna, and then promoted to Judge of the Supreme Court of Cassation (Corte di Cassazione) . He was President of the Chamber of the Court of Appeals. He went on to write about the law in his series Il Fallimento.

== Works ==
Ruisi published 3 volumes on the System of Civil & Commercial Jurisprudence called Il Fallimento.
