= Sherjan Ahmad =

Pakistani-American musician and guitarist

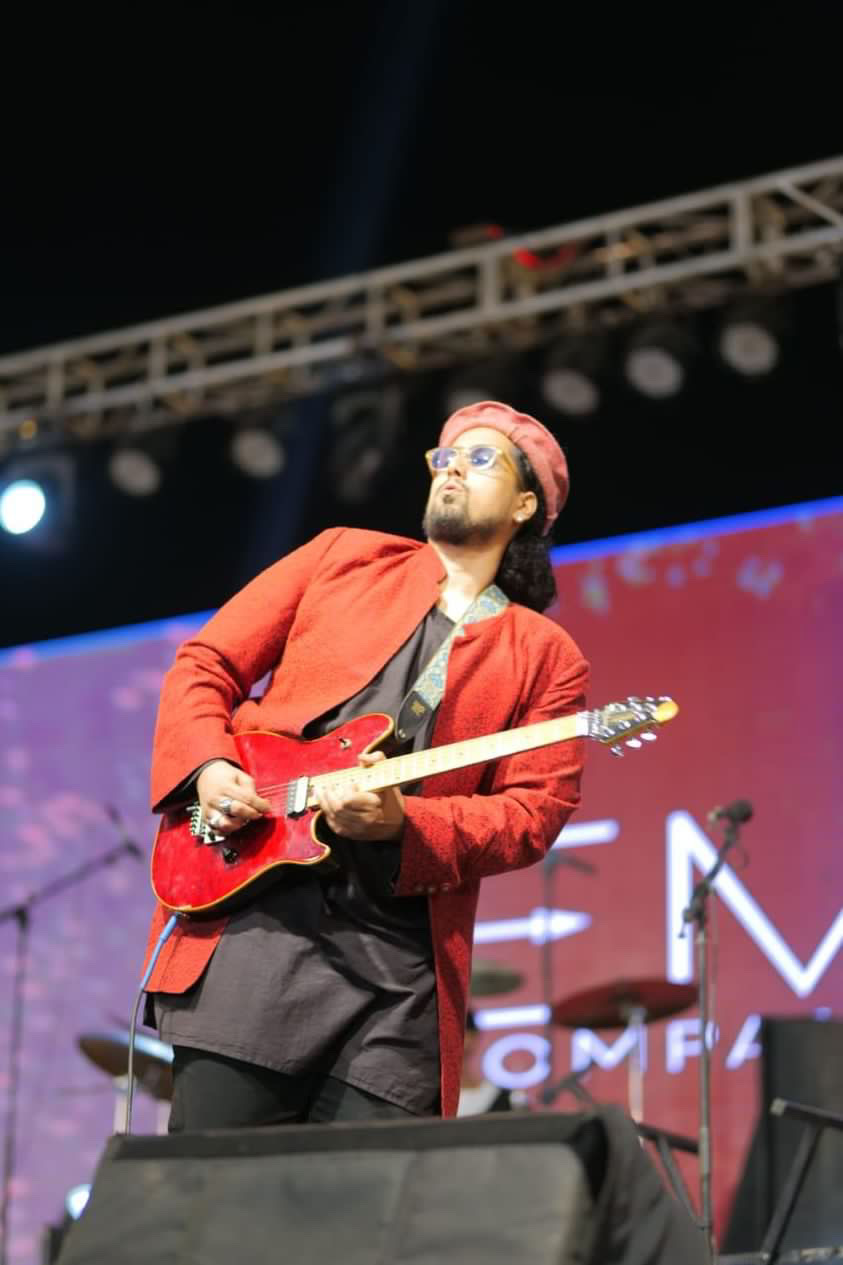
- Sherjan Ahmad performing live

Background information
- Born: Lahore, Pakistan
- Genres: Rock, Sufi rock, Pop
- Occupations: Musician, Singer/Guitarist
- Instruments: Guitar, Vocals, Bass, Keyboards
- Website: https://www.sherjanahmad.com

Sherjan Ahmad is a Pakistani-American musician, singer, guitarist, and performer, known for blending rock with South Asian musical traditions. He has performed internationally, collaborated with global artists, and contributed to cross-cultural nonprofit initiatives. Sherjan also performs as a touring musician with Junoon, South Asia’s biggest Sufi Rock Band.

== Early life and background ==
Sherjan Ahmad was born in Lahore, Pakistan, and later moved to Tappan, Rockland County, New York. He attended Tappan Zee High School and Purchase College. He is the son of Samina Ahmad and Salman Ahmad, founder and guitarist of the band Junoon.

He formed his first band, The BeStills, in high school and performed widely in Rockland County and New York City, including the 2017 "Unity Concert" at First Reformed Church, Nyack.

== Musical career ==
Sherjan Ahmad's music fuses rock, especially Sufi-inspired rock, with Pakistani and South Asian roots. He has performed internationally at venues including Wembley Arena, The Great American Music Hall, the United Nations General Assembly, Coca-Cola Arena, and Dhaka Army Stadium.

He performed as a guest guitarist on Coke Studio Pakistan Season 10 on the tracks "Sayonee" (with Junoon & Rahat Fateh Ali Khan) and "Ghoom Tana". He has collaborated and performed with international artists including Jason Mraz and Peter Gabriel.

His collaboration with Larry Dvoskin, titled "This New Age," is under consideration for the 2026 Grammy Awards.

Two recent features in the Rockland Times highlighted his work:

He was also featured in BOL News for his contributions to South Asian music and international collaborations.

== Non-profit and charitable work ==
Sherjan Ahmad serves with a 501(c)(3) nonprofit based in Rockland County, NY, focusing on music, storytelling, cross-cultural dialogue, rural housing, food safety, and water-pump initiatives. He has performed for nonprofits including The Citizens' Foundation (TCF), Shaukat Khanum Memorial Cancer Hospital & Research Centre, and Islamic Relief USA.

In 2012, he performed with Salman Ahmad and Junaid Jamshed at the Islamic Society of North America (ISNA) convention in Washington, D.C., which was attended by approximately 10,000 people. He also appears in the HBO documentary Open Your Eyes.

== Awards and recognition ==
- Received a citation from Eric Adams, Mayor of New York City, for his cultural contribution and performance at Gracie Mansion during the first-ever Pakistani Heritage Reception.
- "This New Age" (with Larry Dvoskin) is under Grammy consideration for 2026.
- Song "Chaen" from debut album Jaan featured on BBC Radio’s Weekly Pakistani Top 5 charts.

== Discography ==
- Debut album: Jaan (tracks: "Koi", "Chaen", "Hum", "Woh Lagan")
- Guest performance: "Sayonee" & "Ghoom Tana" (Coke Studio Pakistan Season 10)
- Collaboration: "This New Age" with Larry Dvoskin

== Gallery ==
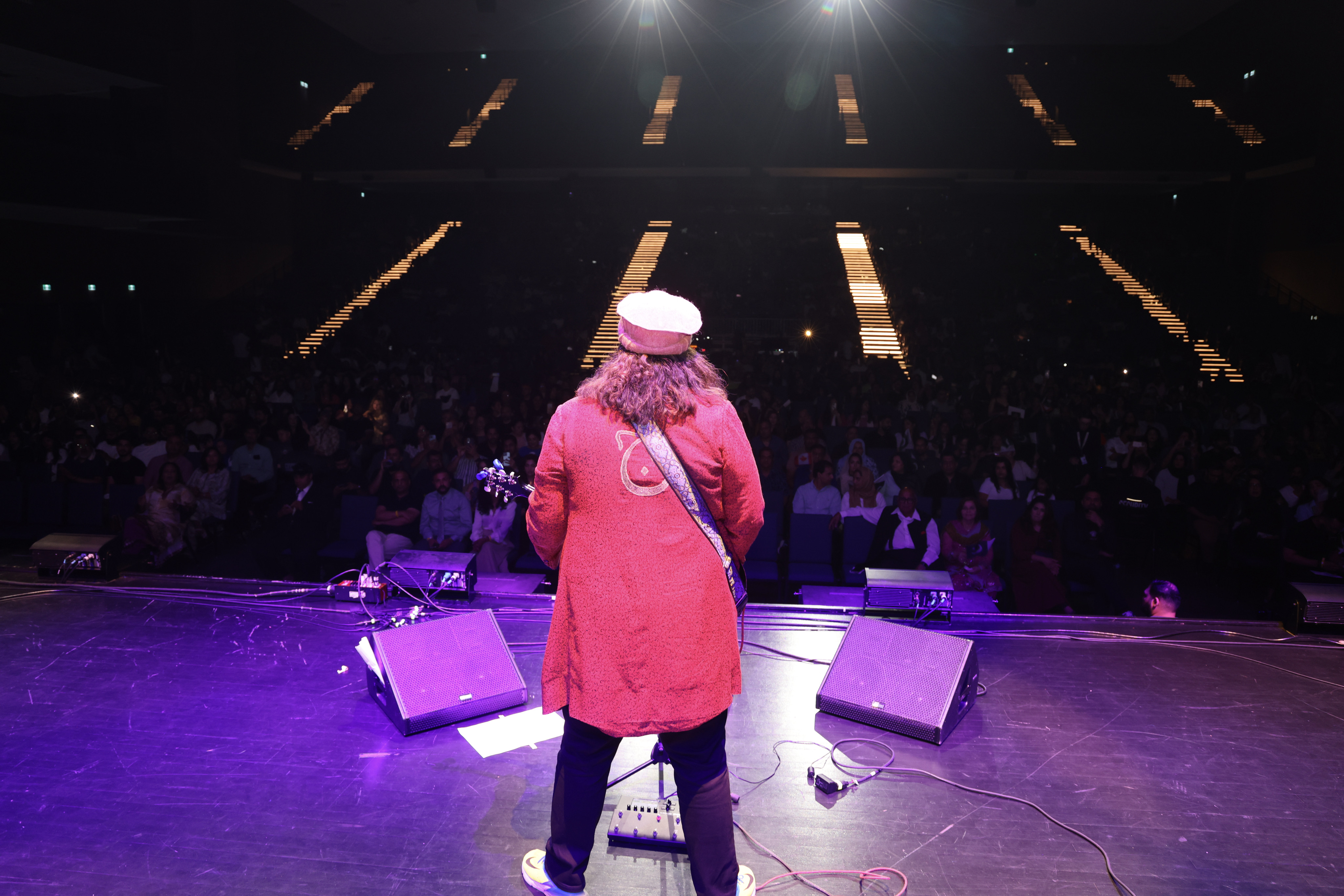
Sherjan Ahmad performing live

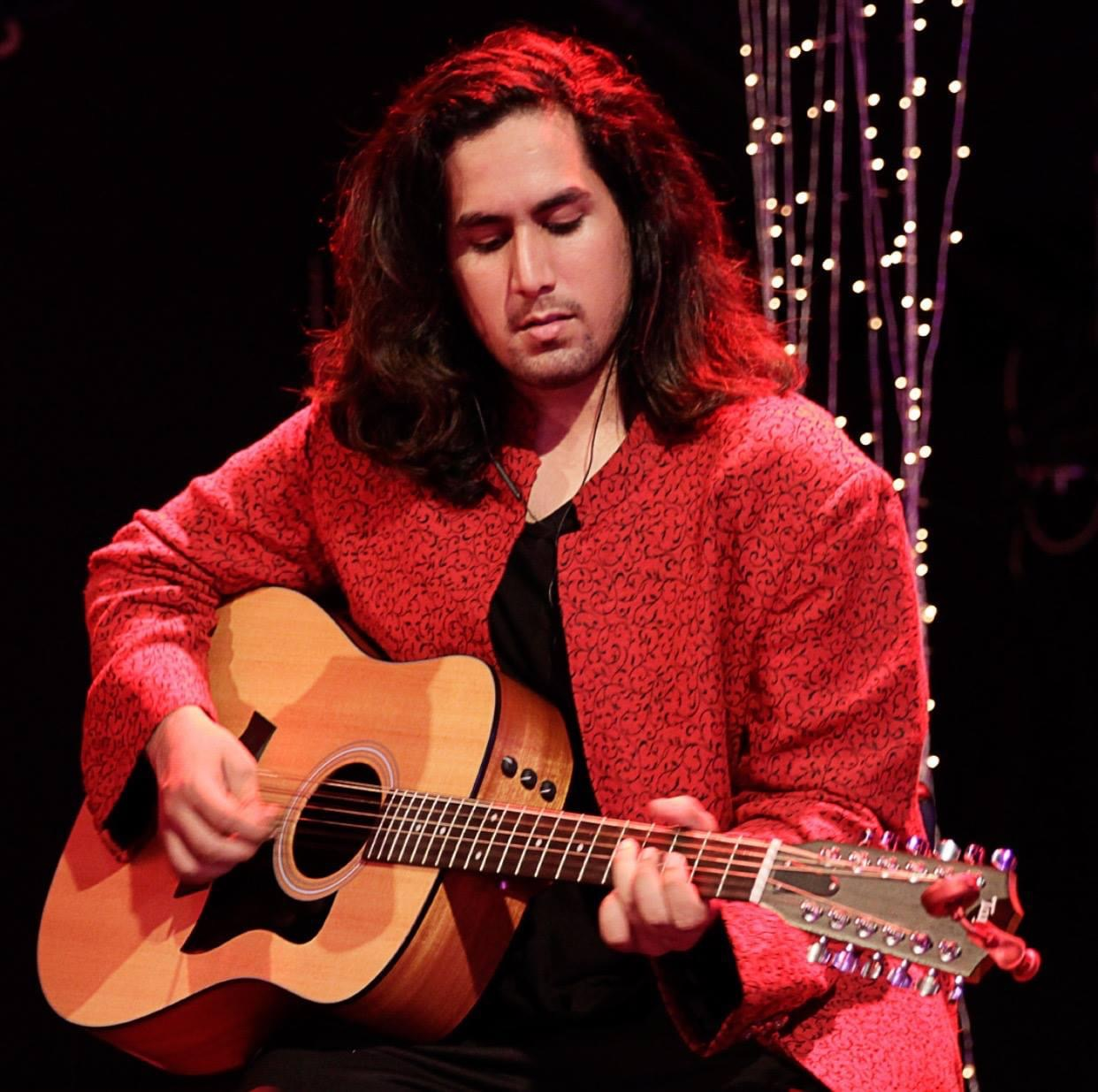
Sherjan Ahmad performing on Coke Studio Pakistan Season 10

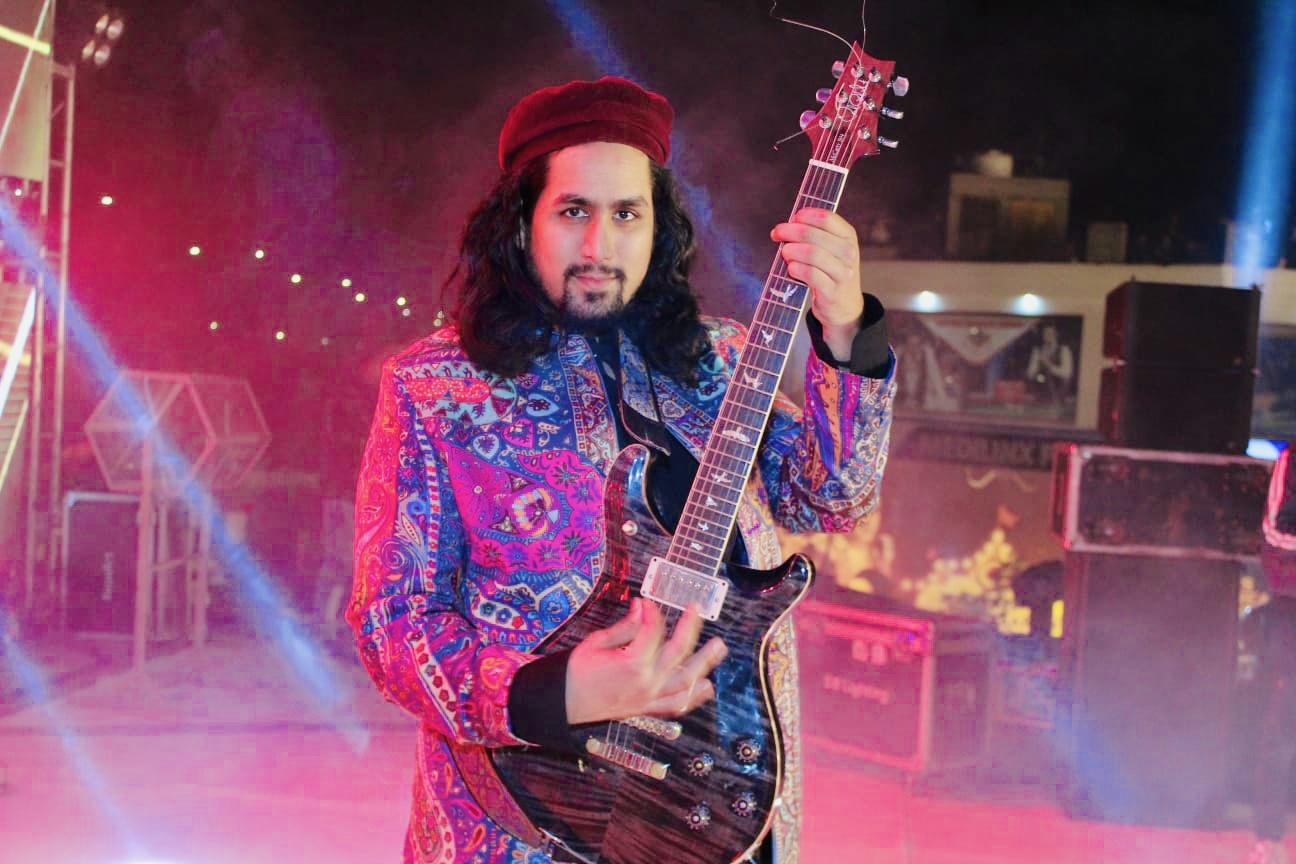
Sherjan Ahmad live in Lahore, Pakistan

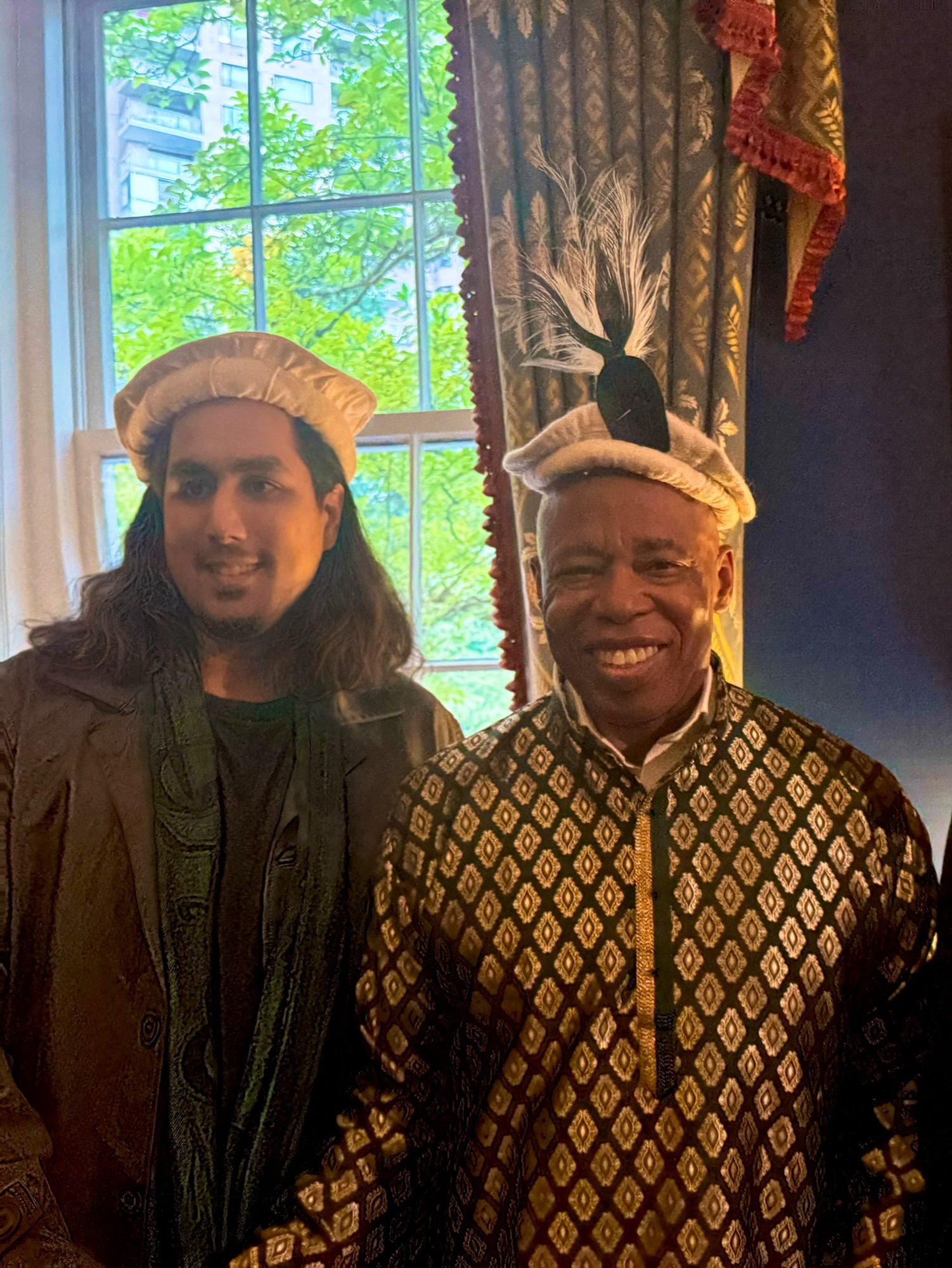
Sherjan Ahmad with NYC Mayor Eric Adams
