= Rock'n Geral =

Studio album by Barão Vermelho
- Released: 1987
- Genre: Brazilian rock blues rock pop rock hard rock
- Label: WEA
- Producer: Ezequiel Neves; Liminha

Barão Vermelho chronology
Declare Guerra (1986)	Rock'n Geral (1987)	Carnaval (1988)

Rock'n Geral is the fifth album by brazilian rock band Barão Vermelho, released in 1987. It's the second album with Roberto Frejat as vocalist. Like the previous one, this album didn't sell well.

== Track listing ==
1. "Amor de Irmão" (Brotherly Love)
2. "Sonhos que Dinheiro Nenhum Compra" (Dreams That No Money Can Buy)
3. "Tá Difícil de Aturar" (It's Getting Hard to Put Up with It)
4. "Completamente Nova" (Completely Young)
5. "Blues do Abandono" (Abandon Blues)
6. "Me Acalmo, Me Desespero" (I Calm Down, I Despair)
7. "Copacabana"
8. "Dignidade" (Dignity)
9. "Agora Tudo Acabou" (It's All Over Now)
10. "Quem Me Olha Só" (Those Who See Me Alone)
11. "Contravenção" (Misdemeanor)

== Personnel ==
Barão Vermelho

- Roberto Frejat – lead and background (1, 11) vocals, guitars, harmonica
- Dé Palmeira – bass, background vocals
- Guto Goffi – drums
- Maurício Barros – keyboards, background vocals

Additional musicians

- Ezequiel Neves (credited as Zeca Jagger and O Abominável Ezequiel Neves) – background vocals (1, 11)
- Peninha – percussion (2, 3, 7), tambourine (on "Dignidade" and "Contravenção"), cowbell (on "Contravenção")
- Liminha – percussive guitar (on "Blues do Abandono"), percussion (on "Tá Difícil de Aturar"), rhythm guitar (on "Tá Difícil de Aturar" and "Quem Me Olha Só"), tambourine (on "Me Acalmo, Me Desespero" and "ContravençãoC"), background vocals (on "Contravenção")
- Zé Luís – tenor saxophone and solo (on "Me Acalmo, Me Desespero"♧
- Serginho Trombone – trombone (on "Copacabana" and "Quem Me Olha Só"), conductor and horn arrangement (on "Quem Me Olha Só")
- Fernando Magalhães – rhythm guitar and first solo (on "Agora Tudo Acabou")
- Raul Mascarenhas – alto saxophone (on "Quem Me Olha Só")
- Chico Sá – baritone saxophone (on "Quem Me Olha Só")
- Zé Carlos – tenor saxophone (on "Quem Me Olha Só")
- Bidinho, Don Harris – trumpet (on "Quem Me Olha Só")

Production

- Ezequiel Neves – production
- Liminha – production
- Adriana Hudson – production assistance
- Paulo Junqueiro – recording, mixing
- Vitor Farias – recording
- Ricardo Garcia – mastering
- Antoine Midani, Arthur Bello, Bernardo Muricy, Mauro Bianchi – assistant engineers
