= Brasil (Cazuza song) =

1988 pop-rock song written and performed by Cazuza

Single by Cazuza

from the album Ideologia
- Released: 1988
- Genre: Alternative rock
- Length: 3:12
- Label: Universal Music
- Songwriters: Cazuza, Nilo Romero and George Israel
- Producers: Cazuza, Nilo Romero and Ezequiel Neves

"Brasil"

Single by Gal Costa

from the album Vale Tudo (OST)
- Released: 1988
- Genre: Samba
- Length: 2:42
- Label: Som Livre
- Songwriters: Cazuza, Nilo Romero and George Israel

"Brasil" is a pop-rock song written and performed by Cazuza, recorded as the sixth track in his third solo album Ideologia (1988). The most well-known version of this song was recorded as a samba by Gal Costa on the soundtrack album of the telenovela Vale Tudo (1988).

== Song information ==
The lyrics of "Brasil" were composed by Cazuza and Nilo Romero, and the music by George Israel (saxophone player of Kid Abelha). The song expresses an anti-nationalist feeling and a pessimist view on the Brazilian lifestyle and "way to handle things" (the famous "jeitinho brasileiro"). Although the song was featured on the soundtrack of Vale Tudo, a Rede Globo telenovela, it criticized the popular fascination with the network's newsmagazine TV program Fantástico.

== Versions ==
- Cazuza in the album Ideologia (1988)
- Gal Costa in both Vale Tudo (1988) and Vale Tudo (2025) soundtracks
- Deborah Blando in the album A Different Story (1991) (recorded in a medley with "Aquarela do Brasil")
- Kid Abelha in a live album Acústico MTV (2002)
- Cássia Eller, available in the compilation album Perfil (2003)

== Awards ==
"Brasil" received two Sharp Awards in 1988. Gal Costa won a special award for Best Song of the Year, while Cazuza won in the category for Best Pop/Rock Song of the Year.

== See also ==
- "Aquarela do Brasil", a patriotic song written in 1939 by Ary Barroso.
