= Barão Vermelho (album) =

Studio album by Barão Vermelho
- Released: September 1982
- Recorded: May 1982
- Genre: Brazilian rock, blues-rock, pop rock, hard rock
- Length: 31:09
- Label: Som Livre
- Producer: Ezequiel Neves; Guto Graça Mello

Barão Vermelho chronology
Barão Vermelho (1982)	Barão Vermelho 2 (1983)

Barão Vermelho is the first album by Brazilian rock band Barão Vermelho, released in 1982. The album includes the song "Todo Amor Que Houver Nessa Vida" (All The Love There Is In This Life), which became one of the band's classics.

== Track listing ==
Barão Vermelho track listing
No.	Title	Length
1.	"Possando de Star" (Posing as a Star)	2:18
2.	"Down em Mim" (Down on Me)	3:15
3.	"Conto de Fadas" (Fairytale)	3:39
4.	"Billy Negão"	3:23
5.	"Certo Dia na Cidade" (Certain Day on the City)	4:43
6.	"Rock 'n Geral" (Rock 'n' General)	2:43
7.	"Ponto Fraco" (Weak Point)	2:54
8.	"Por Aí" (Somewhere)	3:40
9.	"Todo Amor Que Houver Nessa Vida" (All the Love There Is in This Life)	2:15
10.	"Bilhetinho Azul" (Little Blue Note)	2:19
Total length:		31:09

== Personnel ==
- Cazuza: vocals
- Roberto Frejat: guitar
- Maurício Barros: keyboards
- Dé: bass
- Guto Goffi: drums, percussion
