= Declare Guerra =

Studio album by Barão Vermelho
- Released: 1986
- Recorded: September 1985–March 1986
- Genre: Brazilian rock Blues rock Pop rock Hard rock
- Label: Som Livre

Barão Vermelho chronology
Ao Vivo no Rock in rio I (1985)	Declare Guerra (1986)	Rock'n Geral (1987)

Declare Guerra (transl. Declare War) is an album by Brazilian rock band Barão Vermelho, released in 1986. It's the first album released by the band after their main lyricist and vocalist, Cazuza, left the band. It's the first album with singer/guitarist Roberto Frejat. The album was a commercial failure.

== Track listing ==
1. "Um Dia Na Vida" (A Day in the Life)
2. "Desabrigado" (Homeless)
3. "Torre De Babel" (Tower of Babel)
4. "Bagatelas" (Trifles)
5. "Não Quero Seu Perdão" (I Don't Want Your Forgiveness)
6. "Bumerangue Blues" (Boomerang Blues)
7. "Declare Guerra" (Declare War)
8. "Linda E Burra" (Beautiful and Stupid)
9. "Maioridade" (Coming of Age)
10. "Que o Deus Venha" (Let the God Come)
11. "Eu Tô Feliz" (I'm Happy)
