= Barão Vermelho 2 =

Studio album by Barão Vermelho
- Released: 1983
- Recorded: April 12–June 15, 1983
- Genre: Brazilian rock, blues-rock, pop rock, hard rock
- Length: 32:40
- Label: Som Livre
- Producer: Ezequiel Neves; Barão Vermelho

Barão Vermelho chronology
Barão Vermelho (1982)	Barão Vermelho 2 (1983)	Maior Abandonado (1984)

Barão Vermelho 2 is the second album by Brazilian rock band Barão Vermelho, released in 1983. It includes their first hit "Pro Dia Nascer Feliz", which became one of the band's classics.

== Track listing ==
1. "Intro/ Menina Mimada" (Intro/Spoiled Girl)
2. "O Que a Gente Quiser" (Whatever We Want)
3. "Vem Comigo" (Come With Me)
4. "Bicho Humano" (Human Bug)
5. "Largado no Mundo" (Dropped in the World)
6. "Carne de Pescoço" (Roughneck Meat)
7. "Pro Dia Nascer Feliz" (rough translation: "Happy at Daybreak")
8. "Manhã Sem Sono" (Sleepless Morning)
9. "Carente Profissional" (rough translation: "Professionally Needy")
10. "Blues do Iniciante" (Beginner's Blues)

== Personnel ==
- Cazuza: lead vocals
- Roberto Frejat: guitar
- Maurício Barros: keyboards
- Dé: bass
- Guto Goffi: drums and percussion
