= Dona Ivone Lara =

Brazilian singer and composer (1921–2018)

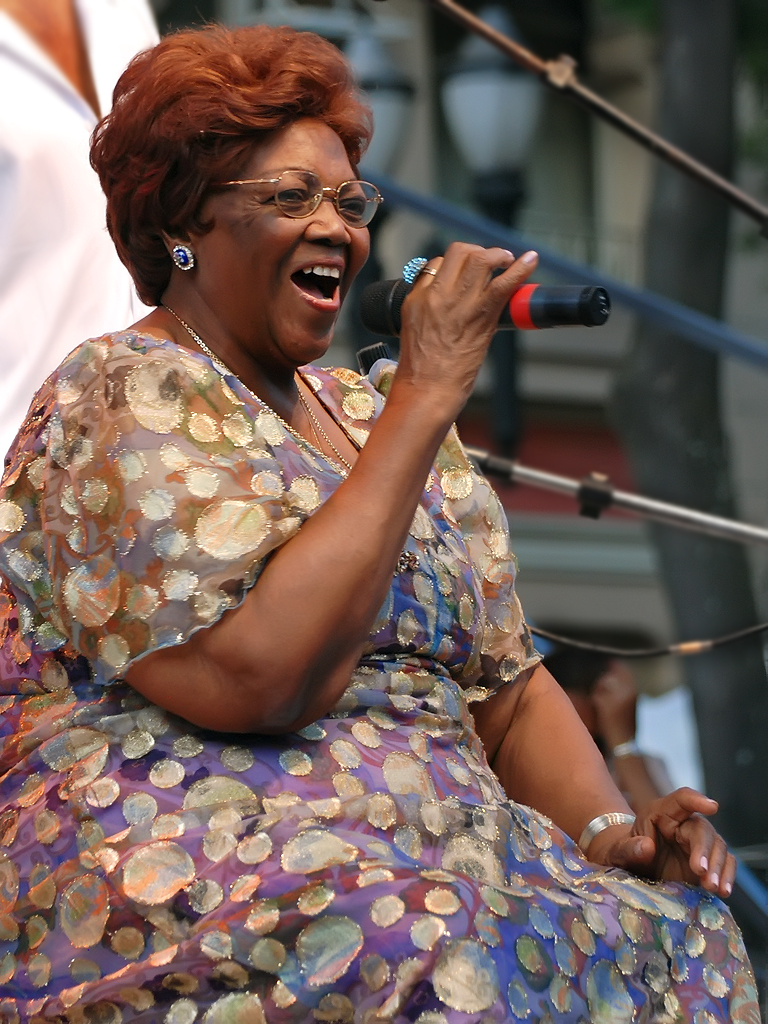

Background information
- Born: Yvonne Lara da Costa; April 13, 1921; Rio de Janeiro, Brazil
- Died: April 16, 2018 (aged 96) Rio de Janeiro, Brazil
- Genres: Samba
- Occupations: Singer, composer, nursing
- Instrument: vocals
- Years active: 1970–2018

Yvonne Lara da Costa OMC (April 13, 1922 (Note: The official birth date that appears on Ivone Lara's documents is April 13, 1921, such as on her voter registration. Some sources, such as UOL Music, mention that she died after completing 97 years, so her birth year would be 1921. Other sources, such as Portal G1, affirm that she died at 96 years old, with her birth year being 1922. In the biography Dona Ivone Lara: A Primeira Dama do Samba (page 18) the journalist Lucas Nobile writes that Ivone Lara's mother increased the age of her daughter by one year, declaring her birth year as 1921 on her identity document, so that her daughter was able to be enrolled in the traditional Escola Municipal Orsina da Fonseca in 1932. In that year, Ivone would have been unable to enroll as the minimum age for enrollment was 11 years old.) – April 16, 2018), better known as Dona Ivone Lara, was a Brazilian singer and composer. Known as the Queen of Samba and Great Lady of Samba, she was the first woman to sign a samba-enredo and take part in a wing of composers in the school, Império Serrano.

Earning degrees in nursing and social work, she played an important role pioneering occupational therapy and worked alongside Dr. Nise da Silveira in psychiatric reform in Brazil. She dedicated herself to this activity for more than 30 years, before retiring and focusing exclusively on her artistic career.

== Biography ==
Dona Ivone Lara was born as Yvonne Lara da Costa on April 13, 1922 on the street Voluntários da Pátria, in Botafogo, Zona Sul in Rio de Janeiro. She was the first daughter of seamstress Emerentina Bento da Silva and João da Silva Lara. Parallelly in work, both of her parents had musical interests: he was a 7-string guitar player and participated in parades with the Bloco dos Africanos, and she was an excellent singer and lent her soprano voice to traditional ranchos carnavalescos in Rio de Janeiro, such as Flor do Abacate and Ameno Resedá – in which João also performed. Trained in nursing and social work, she was a health professional for more than 30 years before retiring in 1977.

With the death of her father, when she was younger than 3 years old, and her mother, when she was 16 years old, she was raised by aunts and uncles. She learned how to play cavaquinho from them, and listened to samba alongside her cousin, Mestre Fuleiro. She took voice lessons from Lucília Guimarães and was praised by Dona Lucília's husband, the Brazilian composer Heitor Villa-Lobos.

She married Oscar Costa on December 4, 1947, at the age of 25. Oscar Costa was the son of Alfredo Costa, the president of the Prazer da Serrinha samba school. At Prazer da Serrinha she met several composers who later became her partners in several compositions, among them Mano Décio da Viola e Silas de Oliveira. Dona Ivone and Oscar Costa had two sons, Alfredo and Odir, and were married for 28 years until his death. She lost her son Odir to complications from diabetes in 2008.

=== Career as a Health Professional ===
At 17 years old, Dona Ivone enrolled in the school of nursing at the now Universidade Federal do Estado do Rio de Janeiro (UNIRIO), where she earned a degree in nursing. At 21 years old, she entered in the public tender for the Ministério de Saúde and at 25 she was contracted by the Instituto de Psiquiatria of Engenho de Dentro. There, she attended the Elementary Occupational Therapy Course offered by Nise da Silveira achieving the title of specialist in Occupational Therapy. In this area she played a fundamental role in psychiatric reform in Brazil from 1970 onward. During more than three decades she worked at the Colônia Juliano Moreira, with patients with mental illness.

Dona Ivone earned a degree in social work, being one of the first social assistants in Brazil and one of the first black women to graduate from higher education in the country. Her work in this area was so important that in 2016, the professor of the School of Social Work at the Universidade do Estado do Rio de Janeiro (UERJ), Graziela Scheffer, published the academic article "Serviço Social e Dona Ivone Lara: o lado negro e laico da nossa história professional".

In a period in which patients with mental illness were institutionalized and abandoned by their families, Dona Ivone moved to the counties in Rio de Janeiro and neighboring states, locating relatives of the interned patients to present a different vision of the majority of medical diagnoses, which discredited the mental conditions of these people. All of this made up part of the therapeutic routine and the new complete vision that humanized the treatment of mental health. Beyond this, Dona Ivone brought music therapy to her patients at the Instituto de Psiquiatria do Engenho de Dentro. Using her contacts, she achieved sponsorship for instruments and the creation of a music workshop, which went on to support parties and socialization events among patients, their family members, and the hospital workers. This workshop later on gave rise to the bloco de carnaval "Loucura Suburbana", which still exists today. In 1977, Dona Ivone retired from her nursing and social work career and dedicated herself wholly to her musical career.

=== Career as a Singer and Composer ===
Dona Ivone Lara, Lúcio Alves and Monarco, 1977.

Dona Ivone composed the samba Nasci para sofrer (Born To Suffer), which became the theme song of the samba school Prazer da Serrinha, founded in the 1940s and ended in 1952. When the samba school Império Serrano was founded in 1947, she began to parade in the ala das baianas (Wing of the Baianas) during carnaval parades. There she composed the samba "Não me perguntes" (Don't Ask Me). Her consecration as a composer came in 1965, with "Os cinco bailes da história do Rio" (The Five Balls of the History of Rio), when she became the first woman to become part of the ala de compositores (Wing of the Composers) of a samba school.

After retiring from nursing in 1977, she continued to record and to perform before live audiences. Among the interpreters of her songs are such singers and artists as Clara Nunes, Roberto Ribeiro, Maria Bethânia, Gal Costa, Caetano Veloso, Gilberto Gil, Paula Toller, Paulinho da Viola, Beth Carvalho, Mariene de Castro, Roberta Sá, Marisa Monte, and Dorina. One of her most well-known compositions, in partnership with Délcio Carvalho, was "Sonho Meu" (My Dream), which found success in the voices of Maria Bethânia and Gal Costa in 1978. This album surpassed one million copies sold.

Dona Ivone also worked as an actress, participating in films, and was Tia Nastácia in specials of the program Sítio do Pica-Pau Amarelo. In 2008, she performed the song "Mas Quem Disse Que Eu Te Esqueço" (But Who Said I Am Forgetting You) at the project Samba Social Clube. The track was included the following year in a collection of the best performances of the project.

In 2012, she was honored by Império Serrano, at the access group, with the plot Dona Ivone Lara: O enredo do meu samba. In 2010 she was honored at the 21st edition of the Brazilian Music Awards. In December 2014 she was honored at the 19th edition of Trem do Samba. One month prior, she had participated on the first day of recording Sambabook, honoring her career with the record company Musickeria. Singers such as Maria Bethânia, Elba Ramalho, Criolo, Zeca Pagodinho, Martinho da Vila, Arlindo Cruz, Adriana Calcanhotto, Zélia Duncan, and Reinaldo, O Príncipe do Pagode, did versions of her songs while she herself recorded with Diogo Nogueira an unpublished song, composed by her grandson, André. In 2015, she made the list "Ten Great Women who Made History in Rio".

=== Death ===
Dona Ivone died on April 16, 2018, at 96 years old due to cardiorespiratory failure after remaining interned for three days at the Centro de Tratamento e Terapia Intensiva (CTI) of the Coordenação de Emergência Regional (CER) in Leblon, Rio de Janeiro. The wake took place at the Quadra do Império Serrano, the school of her heart, in Madureira, in the Zona Norte of the city. Her burial took place at the Cemitério de Inhaúma in Rio de Janeiro.

== Discography ==
- 1970 – Sambão 70
- 1972 – Quem samba fica?
- 1974 – Samba minha verdade, minha raiz
- 1979 – Sorriso de criança
- 1980 – Serra dos meus sonhos dourados
- 1981 – Sorriso negro
- 1982 – Alegria minha gente
- 1985 – Ivone Lara
- 1986 – Arte do encontro (with Jovelina Pérola Negra)
- 1998 – Bodas de ouro
- 1999 – Um natal de samba (with Délcio Carvalho)
- 2001 – Nasci para sonhar e cantar
- 2004 – Sempre a cantar (with Toque de Prima)
- 2009 – Canto de Rainha (DVD)
- 2010 – Bodas de Coral (with Délcio de Carvalho)
- 2010 – Nas escritas da vida (with Bruno Castro)
- 2012 – Baú da Dona Ivone
- 2015 – Sambabook Dona Ivone Lara (DVD)
- 2015 – Sambabook Dona Ivone Lara (2 CDs)

== Filmography ==
- 1977 – Film A Força de Xangô, playing the role of Zulmira de Iansã
- 1982 – Special Sítio do Pica-Pau Amarelo, playing the role of Tia Nastácia

== See also ==
- Liga Independente das Escolas de Samba do Rio de Janeiro
