= Barão Vermelho =

Brazilian rock band

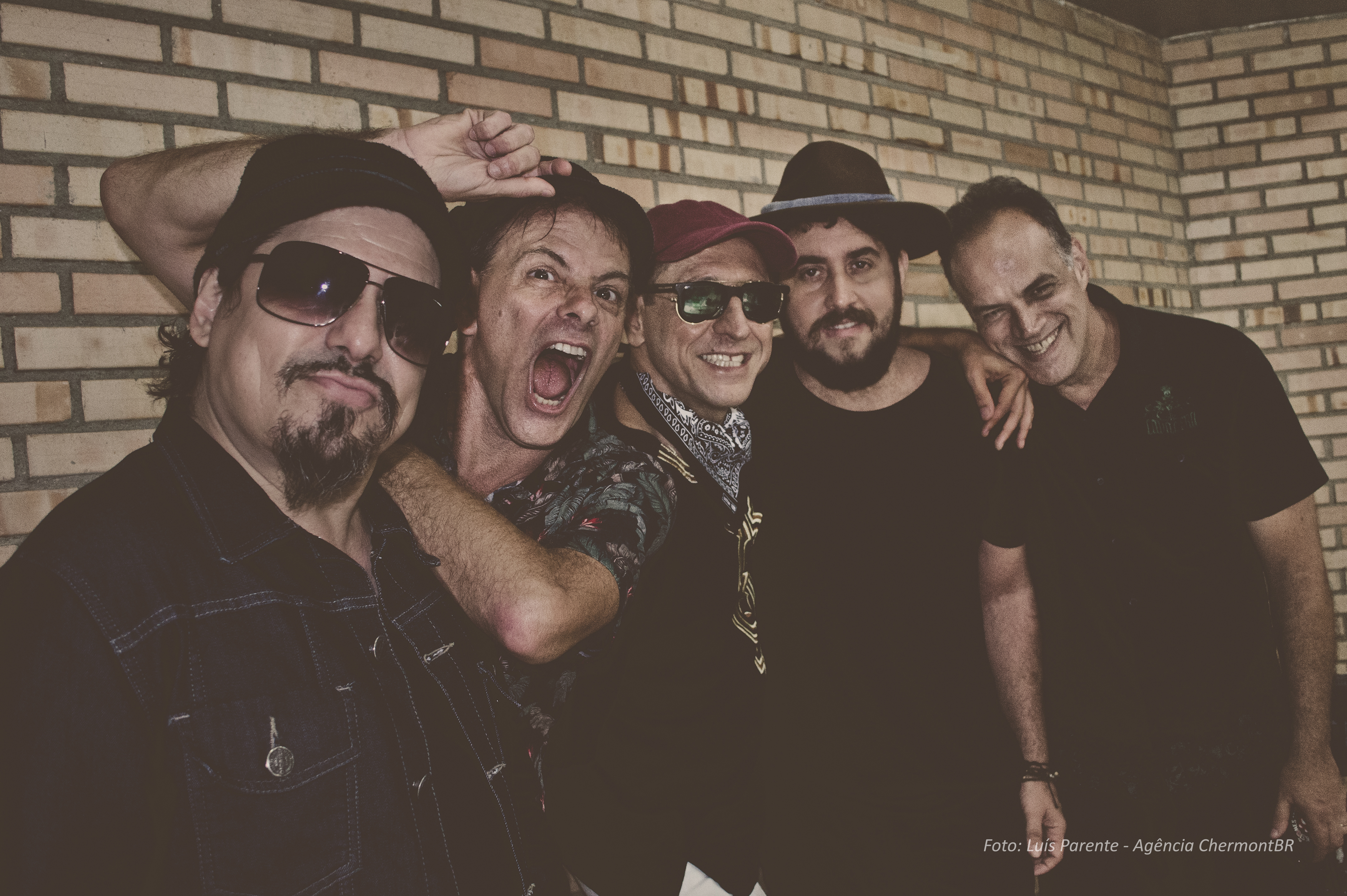
- Barão Vermelho in 2017

Background information
- Origin: Rio de Janeiro, RJ, Brazil
- Genres: Pop rock, pop, alternative rock, hard rock, blues rock, pop rock, garage rock, punk rock (early)
- Years active: 1981–present
- Labels: WEA, Som Livre
- Members: Guto Goffi; Maurício Barros; Fernando Magalhães; Rodrigo Suricato; Márcio Alencar
- Past members: Sergio Serra; Cazuza; Dé Palmeira; Dadi Carvalho; Peninha; Roberto Frejat; Rodrigo Santos
- Website: barao.com.br

Barão Vermelho (transl. Red Baron) is a Brazilian rock band. Formed in 1981 in Rio de Janeiro, it was originally led by songwriting duo Cazuza (singer) and Roberto Frejat (guitarist), who assumed the vocals after Cazuza's departure in 1985. Frejat left the band in 2017 and was replaced by Rodrigo Suricato. They are considered one of the most influential bands in Brazilian rock.

== History ==
=== Formation ===
The band, named after Snoopy's "Red Baron" strips, began in 1981, in Rio de Janeiro, as a literal garage band, when Maurício Barros and Guto Goffi, both studying at Imaculada Conceição High School, got together to play Led Zeppelin and The Rolling Stones at the former's parents' house. Guitarist Roberto Frejat and bassist Dé Palmeira joined them, and the band began to look for a singer. One candidate was singer and guitarist Léo Jaime from Goiás, who was turned down by the band, because they considered his vocal style "too soft" for their taste. Jaime suggested one of his colleagues at acting class, Agenor Miranda Araújo Neto, more commonly known as Cazuza, and noted that he was "the son of João Araújo" – a reference that the barões missed, only later learning that João Araújo was an executive at Som Livre, one of Brazil's largest record companies. Cazuza showed them some lyrics that he had already written, and Barão Vermelho, which had been a cover band until then, began writing their own songs.

They recorded their first album, Barão Vermelho by Som Livre in only two days in 1982. The album included songs such as "Bilhetinho Azul", "Ponto Fraco" and "Down em Mim." They played in a few concerts in Rio de Janeiro and São Paulo and returned to the studio for a month to record their second album, Barão Vermelho 2, which was released in 1983 and which includes the song "Pro Dia Nascer Feliz".

=== Gaining recognition ===
Despite having released two albums the radios refused to play their songs. Barão only gained recognition after Caetano Veloso called Cazuza the greatest poet of his generation and played a cover of "Todo Amor Que Houver Nessa Vida", and Ney Matogrosso recorded "Pro Dia Nascer Feliz". As a result, they were invited to write the soundtrack for a film called "Bete Balanço" in 1984, spreading their fame across the country. This same year they released their third album, Maior Abandonado, which includes the song "Bete Balanço". This album sold more than 100 thousand copies in only 6 months. In January 1985, Barão Vermelho played at Rock in Rio.

=== Cazuza leaves ===
Cazuza had already expressed his desire to pursue a solo career, and had Frejat's support as long as he did not leave the band. However, after some fights, Cazuza left the band for good, taking with him a few songs for his first solo album. Frejat took over as singer and in 1986 the band released their fourth album, Declare Guerra. Though famous artists like Renato Russo and Arnaldo Antunes helped compose the album, it did not receive much promotion. In 1987 they released their fifth album, Rock'n Geral. The album received good reviews, but sold poorly, selling less than 15 thousand copies. This same year Mauricio left the band and Peninha entered as a percussionist and Magalhães as guitarist. Barros would return as a guest musician in many Barão albums.

=== Back on the Charts ===
In 1988 the band released their sixth album, Carnaval, which mixed hard rock with romantic lyrics. The album was a huge success on the radio, guaranteeing Barão Vermelho the opportunity to open for Rod Stewart in Brazil. The following year, with their popularity high, they released their seventh album, Barão ao Vivo, and this same year Som Livre released the collection, Melhores Momentos: Cazuza & Barão Vermelho. The album included rare and previously unreleased tracks such as "Eclipse Oculto" and "Eu Queria Ter Uma Bomba".

In 1990 bassist, Dé, left the band after continuous fights, and Dadi entered in his place. This same year, Barão recorded and released Na Calada da Noite, showing their acoustic side. This album included the song "O Poeta está Vivo" – an allusion to Cazuza, who died a few months earlier due to complications caused by the AIDS virus.

In 1991 the band was chosen by the public and critics of Bizz magazine as the best Brazilian band of the year, and recorded an MTV Unplugged. In this same year, keyboardist Maurício Barros returned to the band. The following year they were named the best band of Hollywood Rock.

In 1992 the band released the albums Supermercados da Vida, which includes the hit "Pedra Flor e Espinho" and in 1994 they released Carne Crua, with the single "Meus Bons Amigos" before Dadi left, being replaced by Rodrigo Santos. In 1995, the band opened for The Rolling Stones in the Brazilian Voodoo Lounge shows, and in the following year released an album of covers, Álbum, with the most successful song being a version of Bezerra da Silva's "Malandragem Dá Um Tempo".

In 1998, Barão released Puro Êxtase, a techno-influenced album that became their most successful in the decade, led by the electronica "Puro Extase" and the ballad "Por Você". In 1999 they recorded an album for MTV Brasil, Balada MTV: Barão Vermelho.

The band entered a hiatus in the early 2000s, so Frejat could focus on his solo career. The band came back to release another album, titled Barão Vermelho, in 2004. The following year saw the release MTV ao Vivo: Barão Vermelho, which includes "Codinome Beija-Flor" a Cazuza song, in which they sampled clips from this song's official music video, so to simulate a duet. In January 2007 the band entered another hiatus.

== Discography ==
=== Studio albums ===
- (1982) Barão Vermelho
- (1983) Barão Vermelho 2
- (1984) Maior Abandonado
- (1986) Declare Guerra
- (1987) Rock'n Geral
- (1988) Carnaval
- (1990) Na Calada da Noite
- (1992) Supermercados da Vida
- (1994) Carne Crua
- (1996) Álbum
- (1998) Puro Êxtase
- (2004) Barão Vermelho
- (2019) Viva

=== Live albums ===
- (1989) Barão ao Vivo
- (1999) Balada MTV: Barão Vermelho
- (2005) MTV ao Vivo: Barão Vermelho
- (2007) Rock in Rio 1985 (recorded in 1985)
- (2022) Barão 40

=== Video albums ===
- (1999) Balada MTV: Barão Vermelho
- (2005) MTV ao Vivo: Barão Vermelho
- (2006) MTV Barão Vermelho (1991-2005) (box set with 3 DVDs)
- (2007) Rock in Rio 1985 (recorded in 1985)
- (2022) Barão 40

== Members ==
=== Current members ===
- Guto Goffi: drums (1981–present), percussion (1981–1989; 2013–present)
- Maurício Barros: keyboards, backing vocals (1981–1987; 1991–present), occasional lead vocals (2017–present)
- Fernando Magalhães: lead and rhythm guitar, backing vocals (1989–present)
- Rodrigo Suricato: lead vocals, rhythm and lead guitar (2017–present)

=== Former members ===
- Cazuza: lead vocals (1981–1985; died 1990)
- Dé Palmeira: bass guitar, backing vocals (1981–1989)
- Roberto Frejat: rhythm and lead guitar (1981–2012), backing vocals (1981–1985), lead vocals (1985–2012)
- Dadi Carvalho: bass (1989–1992)
- Peninha: percussion (1989–2012, died 2016)
- Rodrigo Santos: bass, backing vocals (1992–2017)

=== Touring musicians ===
- Sérgio Serra: rhythm and lead guitar (1981–1982)
- Márcio Alencar: bass guitar, backing vocals (2017–present)
