= Ideologia (Cazuza album) =

Studio album by Cazuza
- Released: 1988
- Genre: Brazilian rock, MPB
- Length: 39:08
- Label: PolyGram
- Producer: Cazuza, Ezequiel Neves, Nilo Romero

Cazuza chronology
Cazuza (1987)	Ideologia (1988)	O tempo não pára (1989)

Ideologia is a 1988 album recorded by Cazuza, the third in his solo career. It won the Sharp Awards for best album in 1988 and sold more than 2 million copies. Many of Cazuza's hits are from this album, such as "Ideologia", "Brasil" and "Faz Parte do Meu Show".

The album cover tried to create some controversy. It mixes swastika and star of David. It is a picture taken by Flavio Colker of an art work by Barrão, who gathered objects found in São Conrado Beach following a rainstorm and some illustrations.

Ideologia is considered one of the main albums in Cazuza's solo career as it is the first recording in which the singer tells about his relation with AIDS and death, as it was his first album after the discovery that he was infected with HIV virus.

The opening and title track "Ideologia" was voted by the Brazilian edition of Rolling Stone to be the 83rd-greatest Brazilian song.

== Track listing ==
#	Title	Songwriters	Length
1.	"Ideologia"	Roberto Frejat, Cazuza	4:05
2.	"Boas novas"	Cazuza	2:53
3.	"O assassinato da flor"	Cazuza	2:43
4.	"A orelha de Eurídice"	Cazuza	1:53
5.	"Guerra civil"	Ritchie, Cazuza	3:20
6.	"Brasil"	Cazuza, George Israel, Nilo Romero	3:09
7.	"Um trem para as estrelas"	Cazuza, Gilberto Gil	3:35
8.	"Vida fácil"	Roberto Frejat, Cazuza	3:43
9.	"Blues da piedade"	Roberto Frejat, Cazuza	4:13
10.	"Obrigado (Por ter se mandado)"	Zé Luis, Cazuza	3:30
11.	"Minha flor, meu bebê"	Dé, Cazuza	3:05
12.	"Faz parte do meu show"	Renato Ladeira, Cazuza	2:53
