= Deborah Blando =

Italian-Brazilian singer, songwriter and producer

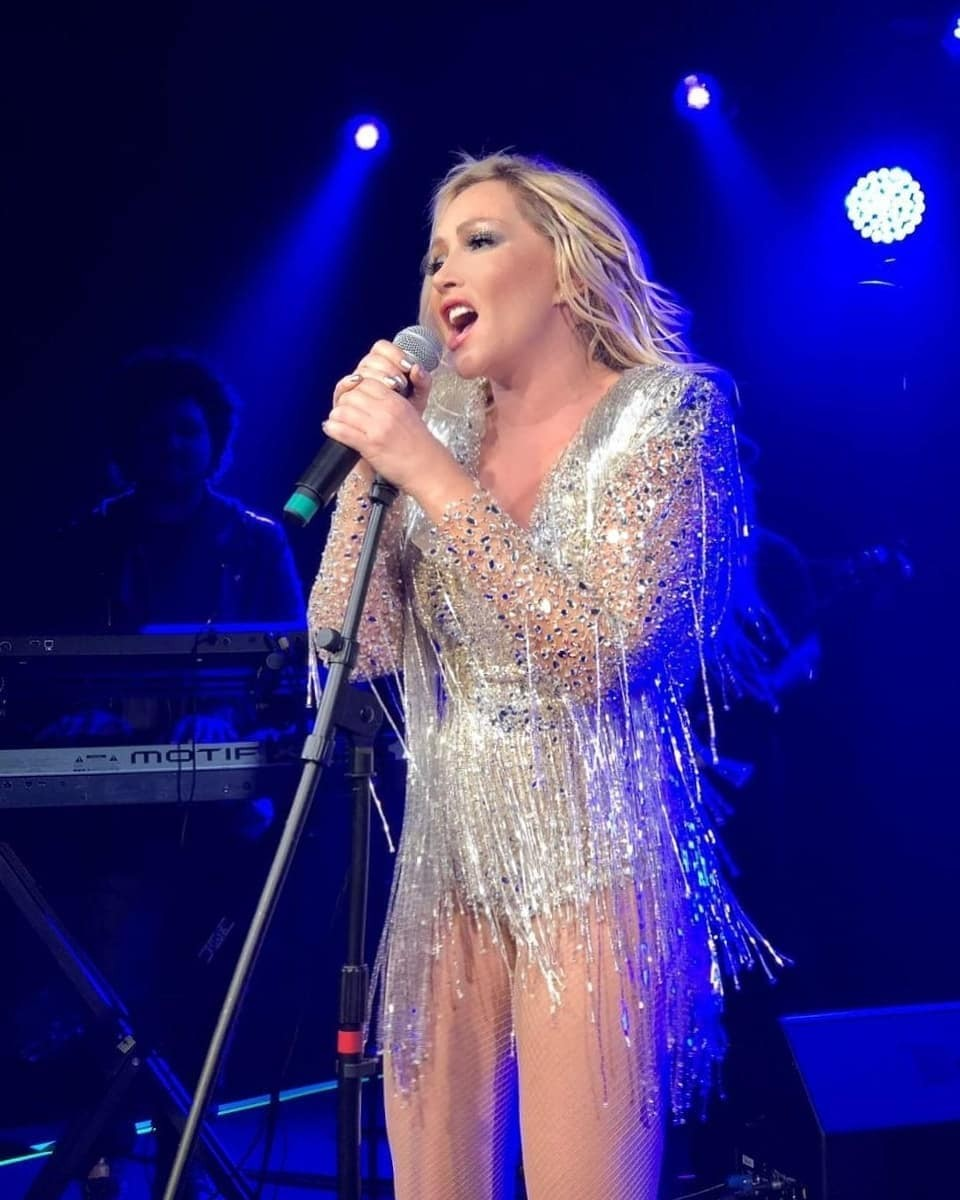
- Deborah Blando in 2019
- Born: Deborah Salvatrice Blando; 3 March 1969 (age 57); Sant'Agata di Militello, Italy
- Occupations: Singer; composer
- Years active: 1981; 1989–2002; 2008; 2011–present
- Musical career
- Genres: Pop; dance-pop; R&B
- Instruments: Vocals; piano
- Label: Som Livre
- Website: deborahblando.com

Deborah Salvatrice Blando (born 3 March 1969) is an Italian-Brazilian singer, songwriter, and producer. Having sold more than 6 million records worldwide, she is considered one of the most successful Brazilian pop music artists. Referred to as the "Queen of the soundtracks", she holds the record of having most songs on soundtracks of Globo soap operas. Aside from Portuguese, Blando also sung in English and Italian, and became known in Europe in 1992 with the pop ballad "Innocence", which was followed by a string of successful records in Brazil and Portugal.

Throughout her career, she has collaborated with multiple world-renowned songwriters and producers, including David Foster, Patrick Leonard, Andres Levin, Camus Celli, Carl Sturken, and Evan Rogers.

== Early life and career beginnings ==
Blando was born on March 3, 1969, in Sant'Agata di Militello, Sicily, to an Italian father, Pietro Carmelo Blando, and Leoni (née Harmatiuk), a Brazilian mother of Ukrainian descent. From an early age, she liked to sing, and joined the Zecchino d'Oro children's song competition at age 2, in which she won the best children's singer category. Throughout the 1970s, she was invited to sing in various TV shows on the Italian TV broadcaster RAI.

In 1975, after relocating with her family to the city of Florianópolis, Brazil, she started singing in children's choirs. At age 12, she was invited to record her first Italian album under the pseudonym Giovanna, entitled Alegria da Gente, which performed on major television shows in Italy and Brazil. Her parents, however, did not want her to pursue a music career, as it would disrupt her studies, and forced her to stop.

After graduating high school, in 1986, she was discovered by singer and composer Oswaldo Montenegro during a talent scout trip to Florianópolis. Montenegro invited her to record vocals for the soundtrack of the theatre play Os Menestréis.

== Career ==
=== A Different Story ===
In 1988, Deborah Blando signed a record deal with CBS Records in Brazil to release her debut album. In 1989, she attended a Cyndi Lauper concert during her Brazilian tour and met Lauper's manager at the time, David Wolff. She performed for him one of the songs she wrote, "Innocence" on a piano, and Wolff saw potential to launch her career internationally. He invited her to travel to New York City to try to land an international record deal. "Innocence" would later be re-recorded and released as a single. After arriving New York City, she performed "Innocence" to Walter Yetnikoff, then-president of CBS Records, who signed her to the Epic Records label.

Blando's debut single, "Boy (Why Do You Want to Make Me Blue" was released in September 1991 and was featured on an international campaign for Diet Coke. Her debut album, A Different Story, was released two months later. "Innocence" was released as the second single of the album, and enjoyed success in Brazil, Europe and Australia, reaching number 1 on the Brazilian charts (where it remained on that position for 13 weeks), number 13 on Norwegian airplay charts, number on 20 on Swedish airplay charts, and number 31 on the Australian singles chart.

"Shame" was released as a single in Europe, and "Other People's Houses" was released as a promotional single in Australia. "Decadence avec Elegance" was released as a single in Brazil and Europe (where it was retitled as "Decadance").

Following the astounding success of "Innocence" and "Decadence Avec Elegance" in Brazil, the album was re-released in 1993 in that market, as A Different Story: Special Edition, where it spawned two additional promotional singles, "Merry-Go-Round", and a cover of the song "A Maçã" by Raul Seixas.

=== Unicamente and Deborah Blando ===
After heavily promoting her debut album in Brazil, Blando parted ways with Epic Records and signed to Atlantic Records for the release of her sophomore international album. She collaborated with David Foster, Patrick Leonard, Carl Sturken and Evan Rogers on the album, which was originally planned for release sometime in 1995 or 1996.

In 1995, Blando collaborated with Spanish trip hop band B-Tribe and recorded vocals for their album Suave Suave. She was also invited by Coca-Cola to record a cover of the song "Descobridor dos Sete Mares" by Tim Maia for a promotional campaign. The accompanying single sold one million copies in Brazil.

Due to health problems in her family, she returned to Brazil and renegotiated her deal with Atlantic Records to release the album through another label.

In 1997, Blando released Unicamente through Virgin Records, and found immediate success with the first single, "Unicamente". A follow-up single, "Gata", was released, followed by a third promotional single, "Ultima Estória". The album received a Gold certification by Pro-Musica Brasil.

In 1998, Blando released her third album, Deborah Blando, which became her most successful album in Europe, receiving a Gold certification in Portugal. The album spawned two singles, "Somente o Sol (I'm Not in Love)" and "Águias". Almost two years after its release, the song "Próprias Mentiras" also found commercial success due to its inclusion in the soundtrack of the Brazilian soap opera Laços de Família.

=== Salvatrice and A Luz Que Acende o Olhar ===
After the release of Deborah Blando, Blando moved to the United States to record new songs, but faced a major crisis with her record label. She returned to Brazil to release her fourth album Salvatrice, an album featuring covers of Italian songs.

She also recorded the Brazilian theme from the Walt Disney movie Atlantis: The Lost Empire, "Junto Com Teu Sonho (Where the Dream Takes You)".

In 2002, Universal Music released a greatest hits collection called A Luz Que Acende o Olhar, containing five previously unreleased tracks. The title track became a success on Brazilian radio stations.

In 2003, she recorded a bilingual version of "When You Say Nothing at All" with Irish singer Ronan Keating.

=== Career hiatus ===
In 2003, Blando was suffering from panic attacks, and was diagnosed with depression and bipolar disorder. Even though she was going through a personal crisis, Blando recorded an electronic music album, combining house, psy-trance, and ballads with the influence of trip hop, Polares, which was originally set for release in September 2006. The album was not released at the time, and she took a career hiatus, which lasted until 2011.

=== Return to music and In Your Eyes ===
At the end of 2011, Blando announced via her official website that she would be touring again. She went on an intimate acoustic tour featuring her greatest hits as well covers of rock classics from Red Hot Chili Peppers, Nirvana, Prince, David Bowie, and Guns N' Roses.

In 2012, she recorded two new songs for the Brazilian soap opera Guerra dos Sexos, "Anjo" and "In Your Eyes". In 2013, she released her sixth album, In Your Eyes.

=== One Truth and Heart of Gold ===
In 2018, Blando released a new single, "One Truth", and went on a tour to promote her new record. In 2019, she released an EP, Heart of Gold.

In 2019, Blando released a new song independently, "We Fly". In 2020, she released another song, "I Will Never Forget You".

=== Polares ===
In 2020, Blando released her 2007 unreleased album Polares as a gift to her fans, 14 years after it was recorded. In 2023, she surprised her fans again by releasing the special edition of A Different Story on digital music platforms to celebrate its 30th anniversary.

== Discography ==
=== Albums ===
Year	Title	Album details	Certifications
1991	A Different Story	Release: 19 November 1991; Format: LP; cassette; CD	
1997	Unicamente	Release: 19 January 1997; Format: cassette; CD	PMB: Gold
1998	Deborah Blando	Release: 16 April 1998; Format: cassette; CD	AFP: Gold
2000	Salvatrice	22 August 2000; Format: CD	
2013	In Your Eyes	Release: March 2013; Format: CD	
2020	Polares	Release: 17 July 2020; Digital download	

=== Greatest hits albums ===
Year	Album	Sales
2002	A Luz Que Acende o Olhar: 10 May 2002; CD	50,000

=== Singles ===
Year	Single	Album
1991	"Boy (Why You Wanna Make Me Blue)" (AUS No. 122)	A Different Story
1992	"Innocence" (AUS No. 31)	A Different Story
1992	"Decadence Avec Élégance"	A Different Story
1993	"A Maçã"	A Different Story – Special Edition
1993	"Merry-Go-Round"	A Different Story – Special Edition
1994	"O Descobridor dos 7 Mares"	Coca-Cola Commercial Theme
1995	"Nanita"	Suave Suave
1995	"Que Mala Vida"	Suave Suave
1996	"Unicamente"	Unicamente
1997	"Gata"	Unicamente
1997	"Última Estória"	Unicamente
1998	"Somente o Sol (I'm Not In Love)"	Deborah Blando
1998	"Águias"	Deborah Blando
1999	"Próprias Mentiras"	Deborah Blando
2000	"Seamisai"	Salvatrice
2000	"In Assenza di Te"	Salvatrice
2001	"Junto com teu Sonho (Where the Dream Takes You)"	Atlantis: The Lost Empire Soundtrack
2002	"A Luz Que Acende O Olhar (Cuccioli)"	A Luz Que Acende O Olhar
2002	"When You Say Nothing at All (O Amor Fala por Nós)" (feat. Ronan Keating)	O Beijo do Vampiro: Internacional
2003	"Chocolate com Pimenta"	Chocolate com Pimenta: Nacional
2007	"Contrato Assinado"	Sete Pecados: Nacional
2008	"Every Minute"	Polares
2012	"Anjo"	In Your Eyes
2012	"In Your Eyes" (feat. Antonio Eudi)	In Your Eyes

=== Soundtrack ===
Ano	Song	Album
1991	"Boy (Why You Wanna Make Me Blue)"	Vamp
1991	"Boy (Why You Wanna Make Me Blue)"	Coca-Cola Commercial Theme
1992	"Innocence"	Perigosas Peruas
1992	"Décadence Avec Élégance"	Deus Nos Acuda
1993	"A Maçã"	O Mapa da Mina
1993	"Merry-Go-Round"	Olho no Olho
1994	"O Descobridor dos Sete Mares"	Coca-Cola Commercial Theme
1997	"Unicamente"	A Indomada
1997	"Gata"	Malhação
1998	"Somente o Sol (I'm Not In Love)"	Corpo Dourado
2000	"Próprias Mentiras"	Laços de Família
2001	"Junto com teu Sonho (Where the Dream Takes You)"	Atlantis: O Reino Perdido
2001	"Seamisai"	Roda da Vida
2001	"Seamisai"	Xuxa Popstar
2002	"A Luz que Acende O Olhar"	O Beijo do Vampiro
2002	"When You Say Nothing at All (O Amor Fala por Nós)" (feat. Ronan Keating)	O Beijo do Vampiro
2002	"O Vôo da Kira"	Xuxa e os Duendes 2: No Caminho das Fadas
2002	"Quando A Gente Ama É Pra Valer" (feat. Thiago Fragoso)	Xuxa e os Duendes 2: No Caminho das Fadas
2003	"Chocolate com Pimenta"	Chocolate com Pimenta
2007	"Contrato Assinado"	Sete Pecados
2007	"Every Minute"	Sete Pecados
2012	"Anjo"	Gerra dos Sexos
2013	"In Your Eyes" (feat. Antonio Eudi)	Gerra dos Sexos
2018	"One Truth"	O Tempo Não Para
2019	"Boy (Why You Wanna Make Me Blue)"	Verão 90

== Tours ==
- A Different Story (1992)
- M200 Summer Concerts (1994)
- Unicamente Tour (1997)
- Self-titled Album "Deborah Blando" Tour (1998)
- A Luz Que Acende O Olhar (2002)
- Acústico Deborah Blando (2011)
- Remember Tour (2012)
