= Lady Zu =

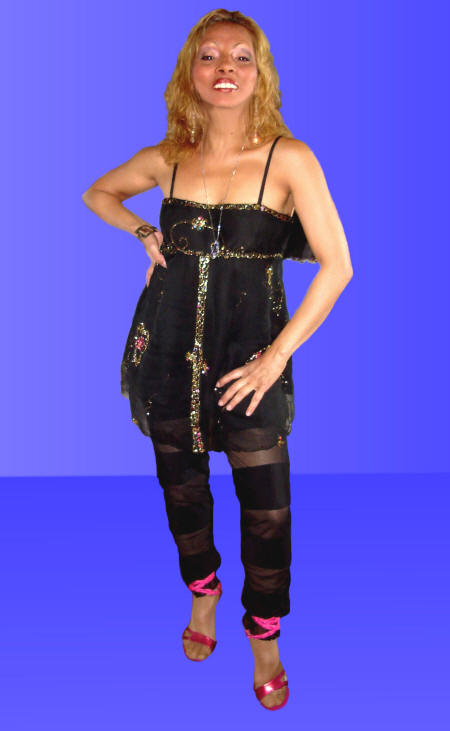
- Zu in 2006

Background information
- Born: Zuleide Santos Silva; 7 May 1958; São Paulo, Brazil
- Genres: Samba, Soul, Disco,
- Occupation: Singer

Zuleide Santos Silva better known for her stage name as Lady Zu is a Brazilian singer and songwriter.

== Early life ==
Silva was born on May 7, 1958, in the neighborhood of Canindé, São Paulo. When she realized that she wanted to be as an artist, her father decided to take her to the studios of TV Cultura to perform at the children's talent show "O Dois É Nosso". Her first interpretation was singing the samba "Triste Madrugada" by Jorge Costa.

She took singing classes at the age of 10 and continued to perform in children's radio and television programs and in dances on the outskirts of São Paulo. Later, she would work as a banker, clerk and an announcer of the Municipal Market of Lapa. She was a fan of Aretha Franklin and Tina Turner, did several tests for crooner in nightclubs, but was always vetoed for being still very young.

== Career ==
The big break would come around 1975, when Silva won a music festival at her school. Among the jurors was the composer Osmar Navarro, who gave her guidance on the artistic medium. Armed with a cassette tape with covers of songs by Roberto Carlos and Maria Bethania, she was introduced to producer Marcos Maynard, then Phonogram (now Universal Music). The empathy was immediate, but Maynard's plans for Zu were off the MPB: the record company intended to bring to the country the international fever of nightclubs.

=== 1977 - 1979 : A Noite Vai Chegar and Hora de União (Samba Soul) ===
Silva released her first single in 1977 and had been toppled out the Brazilian Charts back then and have an opportunity for inclusion for the soundtrack of Rede Globo's Telenovela Sem Lenço, Sem Documento which has a major impact for her career and for the Disco/Samba Music Scene In Brazil. Later that year, she also released her first album and signed a contract with Universal Records.

She stated : It played from north to south. It was super cool because everyone danced, blacks and whites. That was fancy and true

In 1979, another album was released and gave on the hit show Dancin Days.

== The Brazilian Donna Summer ==
Zu dubbed as the "Brazilian Donna Summer" by presenter Chacrinha in 1978.
