= Sant'Agata di Militello =

- Comune
- Comune di Sant'Agata di Militello
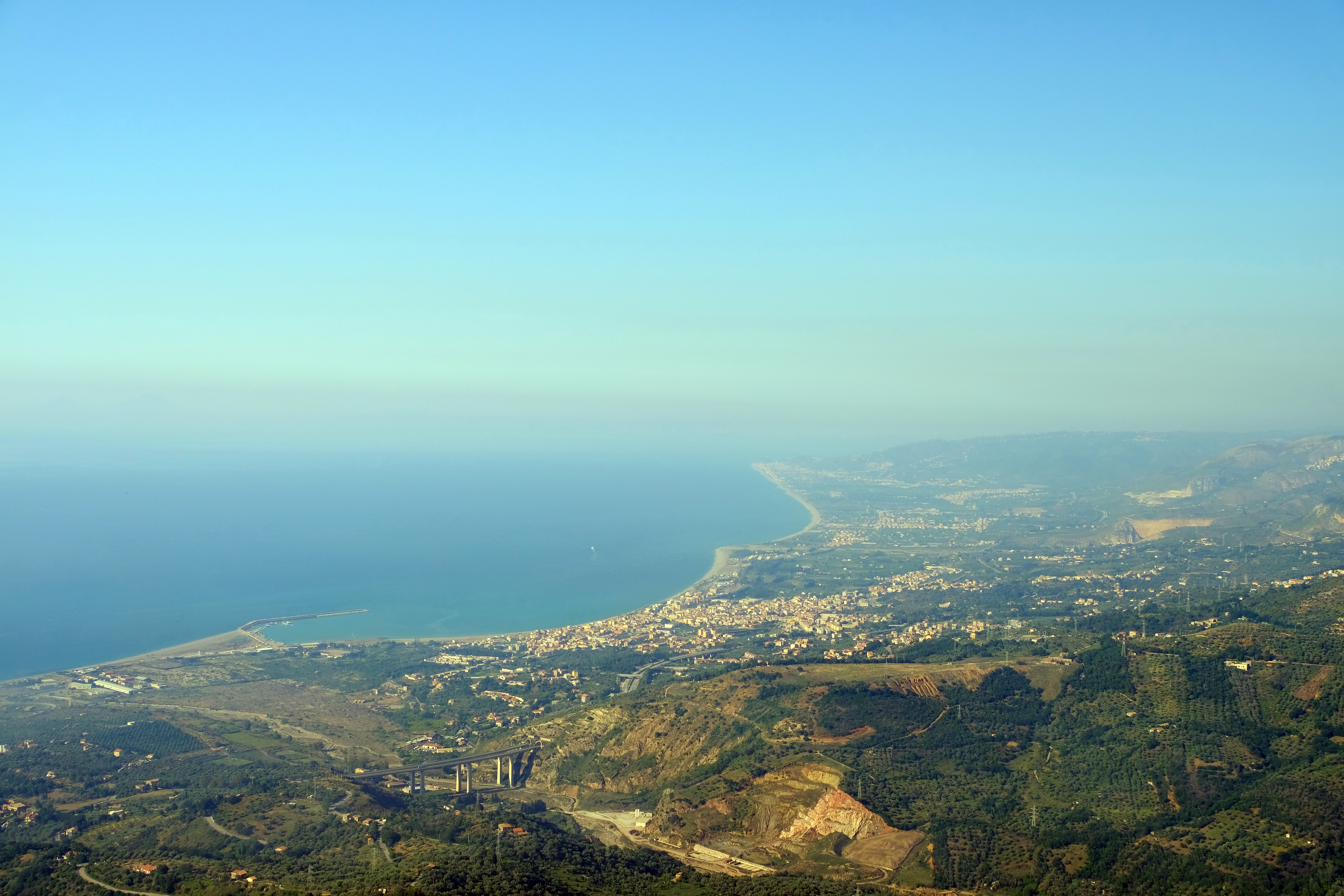
- View of Sant'Agata di Militello

- Location within Italy Location within Sicily
- Coordinates: 38°4′N 14°38′E
- Country: Italy
- Region: Sicily
- Metropolitan city: Messina (ME)

Government
  - Mayor: Carmelo Sottile

Area
  - Total: 33.5 km^{2} (12.9 sq mi)
- Elevation: 30 m (98 ft)

Population (30 June 2016)
  - Total: 12,560
  - Density: 375/km^{2} (971/sq mi)
- Demonym: Santagatesi
- Time zone: UTC+1 (CET)
  - Summer (DST): UTC+2 (CEST)
- Postal code: 98076
- Dialing code: 0941
- Website: Official website

Sant'Agata di Militello (Sicilian: Sant'Àita di Militeddu) is a comune (municipality) in the Metropolitan City of Messina in Sicily, Italy, located about 120 kilometres (75 mi) east of Palermo and about 80 kilometres (50 mi) west of Messina.

Sant'Agata di Militello borders the following municipalities: Acquedolci, Militello Rosmarino, San Fratello, Torrenova.

== Notable people ==
- Vincenzo Consolo (1933–2012), writer
- Deborah Blando (born 1969), singer, songwriter, and producer
