= Rosanah Fienngo =

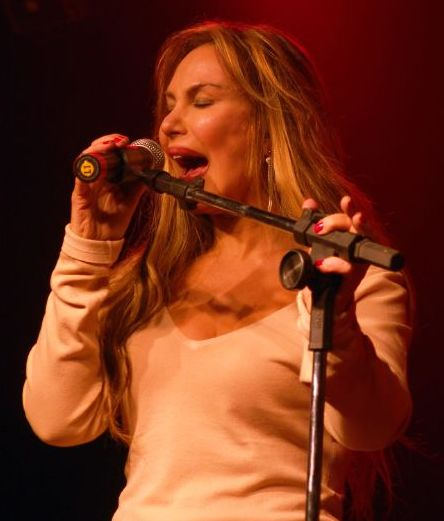
- Rosanah Fienngo in 2005.

Background information
- Born: March 7, 1954 (age 72); São Paulo, SP, Brazil
- Occupation: Singer
- Instruments: Vocal, piano, guitar
- Years active: 1973–present
- Website: www.rosanahfienngo.com

Rosana Fiengo (born March 7, 1954), popularly known as Rosana and as Rosanah Fienngo, is a Brazilian singer. Her greatest hit was the song "O Amor e o Poder", part of the telenovela Mandala soundtrack (1987).

== Early life ==
Rosanah was born in São Paulo neighborhood of Brás, from Aldo Fiengo and Zenaide Romano Fiengo. She began to sing professionally when she was 13 on her father's band Casanova's.

In 1969, Rosanah was vocalist for the band Cry Babies alongside musicians like Luiz Carlos Batera, one of the founders of Banda Black Rio. In 1972, Tim Maia recorded her composition "Já era tempo de Você"

In 1980 she participated in music festivals in television. in 1981 she was qualified in Rede Globo's MPB Shell Festival with the song "Pensei Que Fosse Fácil, Mas Não É", composed by Zé Rodrix. In 1985, she participated in the Festival dos Festivais, and sang the song "Vidraça" in one of the qualifiers. Also in that year, Rosanah participated in the children's TV show A Era dos Halley by Augusto César Vannucci, singing alongside Guilherme Lamounier the song "Luz de Mim" by Daltony Nobrega.

In 1986, after recording some records and participating in others Rosanah sent a tape to TV Globo with a song – "Nem um toque", that ended up featured in the soundtrack of the telenovela Roda de Fogo (1986). With this exposure, the music was extensively performed on radios. Rosana then signed a contract with CBS / Sony Music that year, remaining on this label until 1993 when she migrated to Polygram.

Her greatest success, however, occurred in 1987, with the song "O Amor e o Poder," part of the soundtrack for telenovela Mandala. A version of Jennifer Rush's song "The Power of Love", the track stayed in first place for several consecutive weeks in the charts.

== Discography ==
- 1978 – Fique Um Pouco Mais – (EMI-Odeon) (recorded in 1977) 100.000 (Gold)
- 1983 – Rosana – (RCA Victor) (recorded in 1982) 30.000
- 1987 – Coração Selvagem – (Epic/CBS) (recorded in 1986) 5.000.000 (Platinum)
- 1988 – Vício Fatal – Ao Vivo – (Epic/CBS) (recorded in 1987) 1.250.000 (Platinum)
- 1989 – Onde o Amor Me Leva – (Epic/CBS) (recorded in 1988) 180.000 (Gold)
- 1990 – Por Donde el Amor Me Lleva – in Spanish – (Epic/CBS) (recorded in 1989)
- 1990 – Doce Pecado – (Epic/CBS) (recorded in 1989) 70.000
- 1992 – Paixão – (Columbia/CBS) (recorded in 1991) 50.000
- 1993 – Gata de Rua – (Columbia/CBS) (recorded in 1992) 500.000 (Platinum)
- 1994 – Essa Sou Eu – (Polygran) (recorded in 1993) 100.000 (Gold)
- 1996 – Vende Peixe-Se – (Natasha Records) (recorded in 1995) 15.000
- 2003 – Rosana – (Movieplay) (recorded in 2002) 5.000

=== Guest participations ===
- 2011 – Para Sempre: Lenilton & Amigos (música "Elo de Amor")

=== Soundtracks ===
- 1978 – Fique um Pouco Mais – Pecado Rasgado, Rede Globo;
- 1985 – Está em Você – Jogo do Amor, SBT;
- 1986 – Do nada pra lugar nenhum – Hipertensão, Rede Globo;
- 1986 – Nem Um Toque – Roda de Fogo, Rede Globo;
- 1987 – O Amor e o Poder – Mandala, Rede Globo;
- 1988 – Direto no Olhar – O Salvador da Pátria, Rede Globo;
- 1989 – Onde o Amor me leva – O Sexo dos Anjos, Rede Globo;
- 1990 – Cidadã do Mundo – Gente Fina, Rede Globo;
- 1991 – Música e Lágrima – Rosa Selvagem, SBT;
- 1991 – Me Tira do Rumo, feat. Emanuel – Rosa Selvagem, SBT;
- 1991 – Riscos do Amor – Salomé, Rede Globo;
- 1994 – Se eu me apaixonar, feat. Edmon Costa – Quatro por Quatro, Rede Globo;
- 1997 – Linha de Fogo – Malhação, Rede Globo;
- 2000 – Diga (abertura) – Olhar de Mulher, Rede Record;
- 2001 – Enquanto a vida passa – Roda da Vida, Rede Record;
- 2005 – Ninguém te amou assim – Prova de Amor, Rede Record;
- 2008 – Reencontro, duet with Rodrigo Faro – Os Mutantes: Caminhos do Coração, Rede Record;
- 2009 – Lovin´ You – trilha internacional de Caras & Bocas, Rede Globo;
- 2010 – Greatest Love of All – trilha internacional de Ti-ti-ti, Rede Globo;

== Controversy ==
=== Date of birth ===
In 2014, the singer sued the Wikimedia Foundation (the organization that maintains Wikipedia) and Google, claiming that the sites spread false information and offensive facts to her honor in her biography, such as a supposedly wrong date of birth. As a result of an injunction granted to Rosanah, access to her article in Portuguese Wikipedia was publicly unavailable for almost two years. In 2012, the singer had already considered prosecuting Google before because search results indicated pages that gave her an age she claimed wrong.

During Rosanah's public career, several divergent claims were published about her date of birth. In 1987, Veja magazine stated that the singer was 25 years old (born 1961 or 1962). In 1999, Istoé Gente magazine stated that Rosanah was 36 years old (born 1962 or 1963). According to the artist's record in the Cravo Albin Dictionary of Brazilian Popular Music, she would have been born in 1963. In 2008, Globo.com published a video clip of the singer that supposedly would have been aired on Fantástico in 1978. The recording features Rosanah at the end of puberty.

In 2010, EGO magazine reported that singer was 56 years old and in the same year, the magazine published "Spending sensuality at the age of 42- an age that she made a point of correcting after misunderstanding with a search site that had published 56". In 2012, Fienngo stated in an interview that she was 44 years old and that she was born in 1968. In the same year, a discrepancy was verified on the singer's date of birth, since most documents submitted to the Supreme Electoral Court (TSE) for her candidacy for Rio de Janeiro councilor in the 2012 elections say that Rosanah was born in 1954, but her Cadastro de Pessoa Física (CPF) states the year 1968. In 2016, Rosanah asked the TSE to rectify her date of birth on the website DivulgaCand.

On September 14, 2016, the article on the singer on Wikipedia was restored after a decision favorable to Wikimedia. On October 6 of the same year, her lawyers appealed the decision. However, in July 2017, Rosanah lost the case that moved, because the Court of Rio de Janeiro understood that neither Google nor Wikipedia were responsible for the information. In the decision, Judge Márcia Cunha of the 21st Civil Chamber stated that the artist's age had been taken from the TSE database, since she was a candidate for Rio de Janeiro councilor.
