= Roberto Ribeiro =

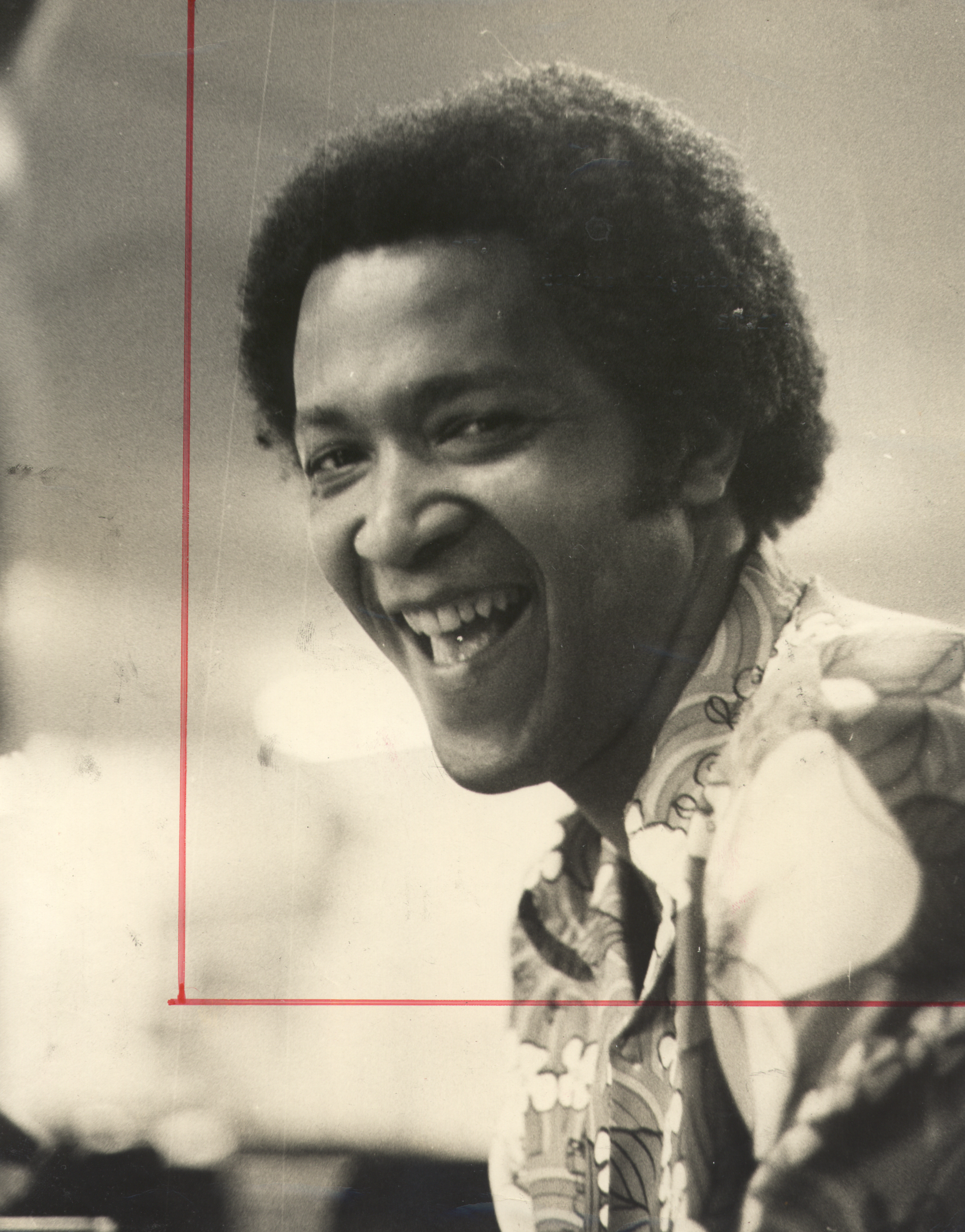

Background information
- Also known as: Roberto Ribeiro
- Born: Dermeval Miranda Maciel; July 20, 1940; Campos dos Goytacazes, Brazil
- Died: January 8, 1996 (aged 55) Rio de Janeiro, Brazil
- Genres: Samba
- Occupations: Singer, songwriter
- Instrument: Singer
- Years active: 1966–1996

Dermeval Miranda Maciel, best known as Roberto Ribeiro. (Campos dos Goytacazes, July 20, 1940 – January 8, 1996) was a Brazilian samba singer.

== Life ==
Son of a gardener, he had already begun working at 9 years of age. By that time, he attended the samba school Amigos da Farra (Friends of Farra), from the city of Campos, and the Pintadinho Boi parties, a local tradition event. Player of professional football in his hometown, he played in Cruzeiro and Rio Branco, both of Campos. He was known by nickname "pneu" ("tire"). Later he was the Goitacaz's goalkeeper and in 1965 moved to Rio de Janeiro and tried to serve in Fluminense, but failed.

However, in Rio de Janeiro, Roberto Ribeiro started to be involved by samba. Even in the 1960s, he has been present in a radio show called ""A Hora do Trabalhador" ("The Labor Time"). The composer Liette de Souza, sister of composer George Lucas and which would be Roberto's wife, was enchanted with his work and decided to submit it to Império Serrano, a traditional samba school in Rio de Janeiro, in the suburb of Madureira. The mutual passion was installed and Roberto went to attend the social samba events of "green and white of Serrinha" (as the Império Serrana is known). Once the directors of the samba school realized his talent and invited to be the handle of the Império Serrano at the carnival of 1971.

After two years away, Roberto Ribeiro has to handle as the school official, defending the samba school from 1974 to 1981. Among the many songs composed, Roberto Ribeiro had twice samba-enredo winners of the competition. In 1977, the school leads the carnival with beautiful samba "Brasil, Berço dos Imigrantes" ("Brazil, Cradle of Immigrants"), coined in partnership with George Lucas, and in 1979, "Municipal Maravilhoso, 70 Anos de Glórias" ("Wonderful Hall, 70 Years of Glories"), with George Lucas and Edson Passos.

At that same time, his career as a singer grow. He successfully throughout the country with songs like "Tempo Ê" (Zé Luiz and Nelson Rufino), "Acreditar" (Dona Ivone Lara and Délcio Carvalho), "Estrela de Madureira" (Acyr Pimentel and Cardoso), "Liberdade" (Dona Ivone Lara and Délcio Carvalho), "Vazio" (Nelson Rufino), "Todo Menino É Um Rei" (Nelson Rufino and Zé Luiz), perhaps his greatest success, and "Meu Drama" (Silas de Oliveira and J. Ilarindo).

Towards the end of his life, he contracted an ocular disease and eventually went blind. In January 1996, he died after being hit by a car in the neighborhood of Jacarepaguá, Rio de Janeiro.

His life was told in the book, authored by his own wife, Liette Maciel de Souza, with the title "Dez anos de saudade") "Ten years of Nostalgia."

== Career albums ==
- 1972 – Sangue, suor e raça (with Elza Soares)
- 1975 – Molejo
- 1976 – Arrasta povo
- 1977 – Poeira pura
- 1978 – Roberto Ribeiro
- 1979 – Coisas da vida
- 1980 – Fala meu povo!
- 1981 – Massa, raça e emoção
- 1982 – Fantasias
- 1983 – Roberto
- 1985 – De palmares ao tamborim
- 1985 – Corrente de aço
- 1987 – Sorri pra vida
- 1988 – Roberto Ribeiro
