= Larry Dvoskin =

American musician, songwriter, producer

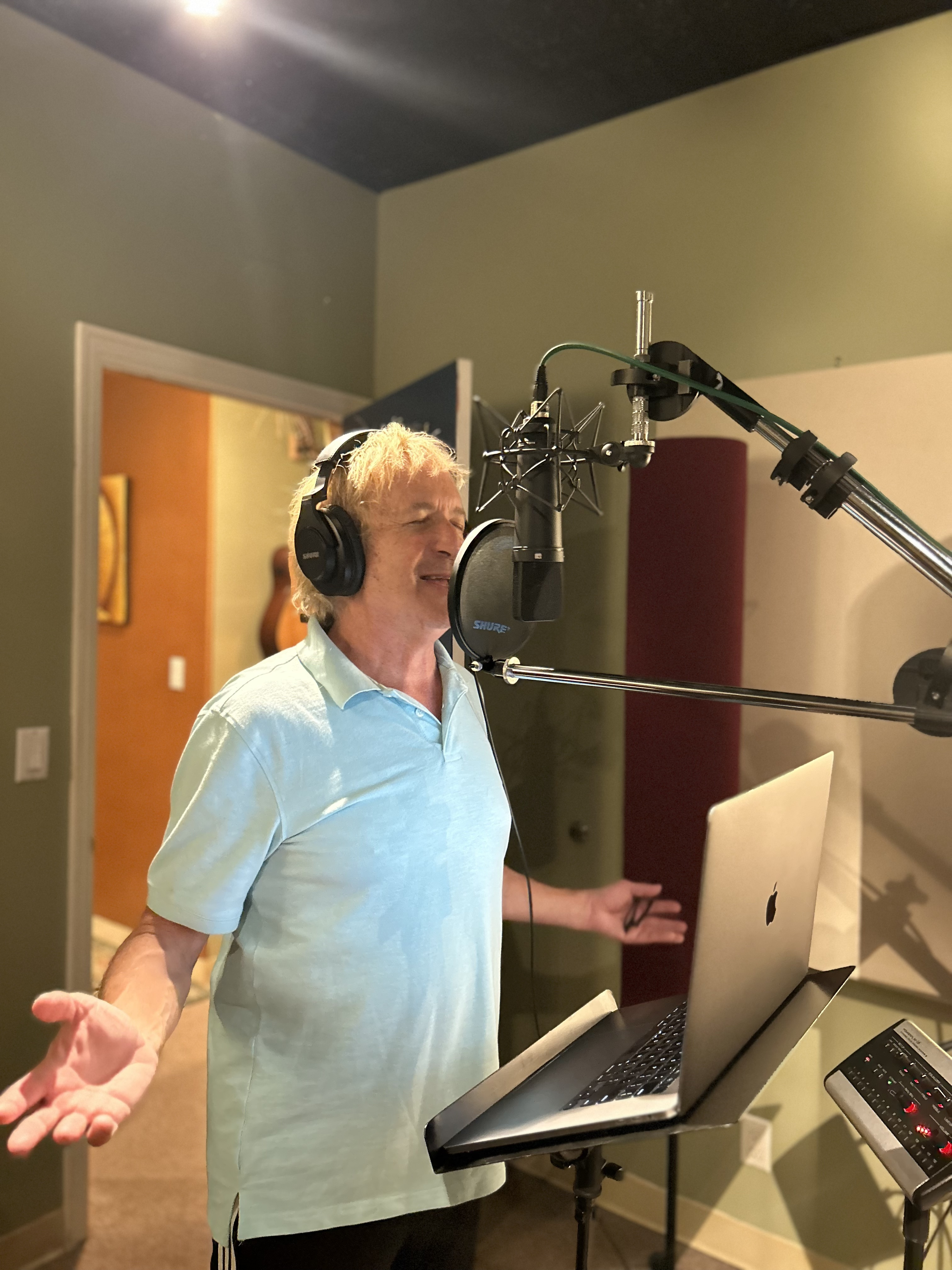
- Larry Dvoskin singing in the studio, 2024

Background information
- Also known as: Larry Dawson
- Born: Laurence Josiah Dvoskin
- Genres: Rock, pop, singer-songwriter, dance, psychedelia
- Occupations: Musician, songwriter, music producer, educator, public speaker, music technology consultant, author
- Instruments: Piano, synthesizer, guitar, vocals
- Years active: 1972–present
- Labels: RCA, Capitol, EMI, Arista, Sony, Warner-Chappell Music Publishing, Sony Music Publishing
- Website: www.larrydvoskin.com

Larry Dvoskin is an American musician, songwriter, arranger, producer, professor and entrepreneur. He is best known in the industry as the songwriting partner of The Beach Boys' Al Jardine. The founder of Do What You Love Media, Miracle Music Inc and Cool Guy Music Inc.

== Career ==
Larry Dvoskin has a long history of working with notable artists across various genres. In September 2024, Dvoskin collaborated with Al Jardine, co-founder of The Beach Boys, on the release of WISH, a tribute single honoring Brian Wilson. The single received positive feedback from fans and was featured on the homepage of Rolling Stone magazine's website.

Dvoskin has worked with a wide range of artists, including Robert Plant, Sammy Hagar, Sean Lennon, Bad Company, Robin Zander of Cheap Trick, Joe Lynn Turner, Meredith Brooks, Uli Jon Roth, Zeno, Desmond Child, The Muppets, Annabella Lwin, Paul O’Neill with the Trans-Siberian Orchestra and Savatage, Beach Boys co-founder Al Jardine, MGMT, and Neal Schon of Journey.

In addition to his collaborations with other musicians, Dvoskin released his single "Life is Strange" in 2020, which became a Top-20 hit.

=== Discography ===
| Year | Artist/Album/Single | Label | Details |
|---|---|---|---|
| 1977 | "Electric God" (Broadway play about Jimi Hendrix) | Stormy Forest | Musician |
| 1978 | Fandango "Last Kiss" | RCA Records | Keyboards, Co-Writer |
| 1979 | Fandango "One Night Stand" | RCA Records | Keyboards, Co-Writer |
| 1979 | Sandy Farina | MCA Records | Telephone (single), Co-Writer |
| 1980 | Fandango "Cadillac" | RCA Records | Keyboards |
| 1985 | "Uli Jon Roth of The Scorpions, Beyond the Astral Skies " | EMI Records | Musician, Keyboards, Vocals. |
| 1985 | Freddie Mercury, Brian May & friends- EMI Tour Gala | EMI Records | Musician, keyboards |
| 1986 | Zeno (debut album) | EMI Records | Musician, Keyboards, Vocals. |
| 1986 | Savatage “Fight for The Rock" | Atlantic Records | Musician, Keyboards |
| 1989 | The Muppets- Jim Henson | Jim Henson Company | Co-writer of "Neptune's Heptune" |
| 1990 | Trouble Tribe (Debut album) | Chrysalis Records | Co-writer- "Angel with a Devil's Kiss" |
| 1990 | Robert Plant | Atlantic Records | Co-writer "Fire Like The Thunder" with Robert Plant, Phil Johnstone. |
| 1990-1992 | Famous Music | Paramount/Gulf & Western | Exclusive songwriter/publishing deal. |
| 1991 | Glass Tiger “Simple Mission” | Capitol Records | Co-writer- "Animal Heart, Blinded" 4× Platinum certification (Canadian Music Recording Association) CMRRA |
| 1991 | Bad Company (single) “Walk Through Fire” | Atco/Atlantic Records | Additional Production & remixing. Certified 2× Platinum in USA by the RIAA. |
| 1991 | Robin Zander | Epic Records | Co-writer "I Can't Go On,"Radio Lover" "House of Love" |
| 1992 | Bad Company “Here Comes Trouble” | Atco/Atlantic Records | Co-writer "My Only One" |
| 1992 | Deborah Blando “A Different Story” | Epic Records | Co-writer "Innocence" #1 hit in Brazil. |
| 1993 | Annabella L’win (single) | Sony Records | Co-writer of "Car Sex" |
| 1993-1995 | Warner- Chappell Music | Warner Music Group | Exclusive songwriter/publishing deal. |
| 1995 | "4PM (For Positive Music)" | London/Polygram Records | Co-writer of "Naturally" |
| 1977- 1992 | Richie Havens | Stormy Forest | Live Musician |
| 1997-1998 | Meredith Brooks “Blurring the Edges” (album & single) | Capitol Records | Co-writer "Stop" (single), "Somedays," "Wash my Hands." Album certified multi-platinum by the RIAA. Best new artist Grammy nomination. |
| 1998 | "Lilith Fair" (album) Various artists | Arista Records | Co-writer "Wash my Hands" Certified 2× platinum in USA by the RIAA. |
| 1999 | Sammy Hagar “Red Voodoo” | MCA Records | Co-writer "The Love" "Returning of The Wish" |
| 1999 | Larry D."Beside Me" (debut album) | The Orchard Records | Songwriter, musician, artist, producer. |
| 1999 | Meredith Brooks “Deconstruction” | Capitol Records | Co-writer "Cosmic Woo-Woo" |
| 2000 | Sammy Hagar "Ten 13" Album | MCA Records | Co-writer "Deeper Kinda Love" |
| 2001 | Kim Sozzi “Feelin’ Me” (single) | Edel/Sony Records | Co-writer. Nominated for "Best Dance Song"Grammy |
| 2002 | David Charvet | Mercury/Universal Records France | Co-writer "All I Want." Certified gold album in France |
| 2002 | David Bowie (Let's Dance- redo) | "Larry Dvoskin - Unreleased" | Executive Producer, remixer |
| 2003 | Glass Tiger “No Turning Back” Greatest Hits package | Capitol Records | Co-writer Animal Heart, Blinded. |
| 2005 | "The Heights (Film Soundtrack)" Merchant Ivory/Sony Films | Tommy Boy Records | Producer, co-writer "Dreaming" (single) |
| 2006 | Sunstorm (Deep Purple vocalist Joe Lynn Turner) | Frontier Records | Co-writer "Love's Gone" |
| 2010 | "We Are the World 25 for Haiti"(Various artists) | Columbia Records | Musician, chorus vocalist. |
| 2009-2010 | Life is Strange” Larry Dvoskin solo album | Cool Guy Records/Tunecore | Co-writer, musician, artist, producer |
| 2011 | Simon Kirke "Filling The Void" solo album (Bad Company) | Megaforce Records | Co-writer, musician, producer "I Want You Back" |
| 2012 | Al Jardine “Postcard from California” | Robo/Universal Records | Co-writer, producer, musician on "Waves of Love." Co-producer of Alec Baldwin narration of "Tidepool Interlude." |
| 2014 | Sammy Hagar & Vic Johnson Lite Roast (acoustic album) | Mailboat Records | Co-writer of "The Love" "Deeper Kinda Love" |
| 2015 | "Imagine- Every Voice Counts" Al Jardine & Friends | UNICEF/UN | Producer, musician, singer with The Beach Boys co-founder Al Jardine on "Imagine- Every Voice Counts." Oct 9th, 2015- John Lennon's 75th birthday in Central Park. |
| 2020 | Larry Dvoskin “Life is Strange” (single & video) | Cool Guy Records | Co-writer, producer, artist, musician. |
| 2021 | California Music “Add Some Music” charity album by members of The Beach Boys. | Omnivore Records | Co-writer, producer, musician, vocals on "Jenny Clover" |
| 2021 | Al Jardine "Waves of Love 2.0" and "Jenny Clover" (CD single) | Miracle Music Inc. | Co-writer, producer, musician, record label. |
| 2022 | David Bowie (Let's Dance- redo) | "Larry Dvoskin - Unreleased" | Producer, musician, vocalist, mixer. |
| 2024 | We Need You Nikki Right Now | Do What You Love Media | Producer |

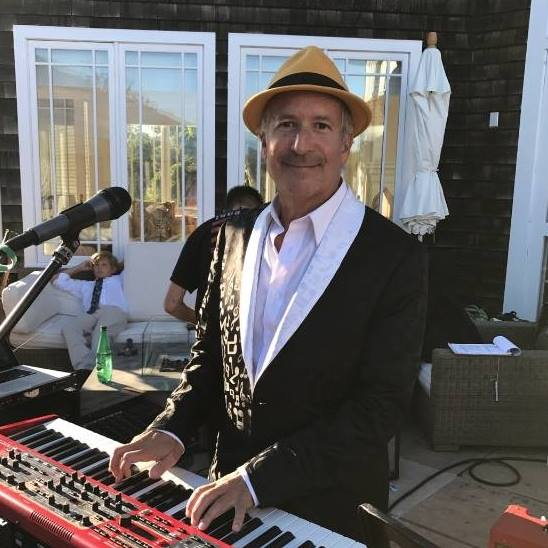
Larry Dvoskin

== Teaching ==
Dvoskin has worked as a program instructor for New York University's High School Academy Songwriting Camp.

== Philanthropy ==
As a response to the COVID-19 pandemic, Dvoskin and Al Jardine teamed up on “Waves of Love 2.0” and “Jenny Clover” in benefit to the World Central Kitchen which provides food to doctors, nurses and other essential front-line workers.

In 2010, Dvoskin performed on a charity single We Are the World 25 for Haiti as part of an initiative to help benefit the people of Hait in the aftermath of the country's most severe earthquake in over 200 years.
