= Cazuza =

Brazilian singer-songwriter (1958–1990)

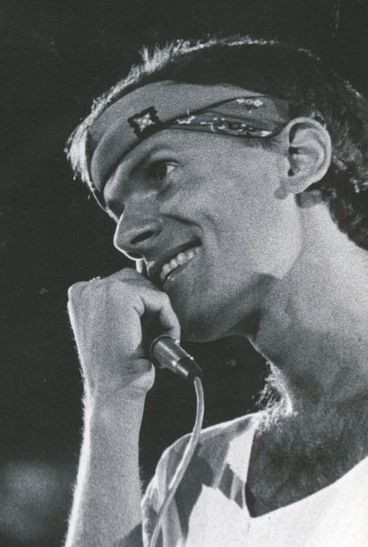

Background information
- Born: April 4, 1958; Rio de Janeiro, Brazil
- Died: July 7, 1990 (aged 32) Rio de Janeiro, Brazil
- Genres: Rock; MPB
- Occupations: Singer; musician
- Instruments: Vocals; guitar
- Years active: 1978–1990
- Formerly of: Barão Vermelho
- Website: www.cazuza.com.br

Agenor de Miranda Araújo Neto, better known as Cazuza (Portuguese pronunciation: [kaˈzuzɐ]; April 4, 1958 – July 7, 1990), was a Brazilian singer-songwriter, born in Rio de Janeiro. Along with Raul Seixas, Renato Russo and Os Mutantes, Cazuza, both while fronting Barão Vermelho and at solo career, is considered one of the best exponents of Brazilian rock music. In his 9-year career, he sold more than 5 million albums and achieved 11 number one singles and 18 Top 10 singles in Brazil.

== Biography ==
=== Early life and influences ===
Son of the record producer João Araújo and the amateur singer Maria Lúcia Araújo, Cazuza always had close contact with music. Influenced since early childhood by the strong values of Brazilian music, he had a special preference for the sad, dramatic overtones of Cartola, Lupicinio Rodrigues, Dolores Duran, and Maysa. He began to write lyrics and poems around 1965. In late 1974, a vacation in London, England, acquainted him with the music of Led Zeppelin, Janis Joplin and The Rolling Stones, and he soon became a great fan. Cazuza enrolled in college in 1978, but abandoned the course of journalism three weeks later to work with his father at Som Livre. He moved later to San Francisco, where he came in contact with Beat literature, becoming highly influenced by it.

=== Barão Vermelho ===
In 1980 he returned to Rio, where he worked with the theatrical group Asdrúbal Trouxe o Trombone (Asdrúbal Brought the Trombone). There he was noticed by the novice singer/composer Léo Jaime, who introduced him to a beginning rock band that needed a vocalist, the Barão Vermelho (Red Baron). With this very successful eighties Brazilian rock band, who had their greatest success with "Bete Balanço", a song that was part of the soundtrack of a film, Cazuza began his career as a singer. In 1985, Cazuza took part in Rock in Rio with Barão Vermelho, and around this time, Caetano Veloso claimed he was the greatest Brazilian poet of his generation. It was also in this same year that Cazuza was infected with the HIV virus, precipitating his desire to leave the band to obtain a greater freedom in composition and expression, both musically and lyrically.

=== Solo career ===
After he left the band, Cazuza's music began to diversify, incorporating elements of the blues in songs such as "Blues da Piedade" (Blues of Compassion), "Só as mães são felizes" (Only Mothers Are Happy) and "Balada da Esplanada" (Ballad of the Esplanade), which was based on a poem of the same name by Oswald de Andrade; showcasing increasingly intimate lyrics, like those in "Só se for a Dois" (Just the two of us), as well as opening itself up to influences from Brazilian pop music with interpretations of Cartola's "O Mundo é um Moinho" (The World is a Windmill), Raul Seixas's "Cavalos Calados" (Silent Horses) and Caetano Veloso's "Esse Cara" (This Guy).

Cazuza's solo career proved to be more successful than that of his former group. "Exagerado" (Exaggerated), "O Tempo não Pára" (Time Doesn't Stop), and "Ideologia" (Ideology) were his greatest hits and proved to be a great influence on subsequent Brazilian musicians.

Cazuza co-wrote the song "Preciso Dizer que Te Amo" with Bebel Gilberto which was released in 1986 on her self-titled EP. The song was also featured posthumously in the 1996 AIDS benefit album Red Hot + Rio produced by the Red Hot Organization in a duet with Bebel Gilberto.

=== Final years ===
In 1989, he admitted publicly for the first time that he had AIDS and released his last album in life: Burguesia. Cazuza was openly bisexual but was not active in the LGBT movement. However, his openness about being a person with AIDS helped to change public perceptions and attitudes about HIV/AIDS prevention and treatment.

=== Death ===
Cazuza died in Rio de Janeiro on July 7, 1990, at the age of 32, due to a septic shock caused by AIDS. He was buried at the Cemitério São João Batista in Botafogo, Rio de Janeiro. Cazuza's mother set up the Viva Cazuza Society (Sociedade Viva Cazuza), a charity which sponsors AIDS prevention and provides a home for HIV-positive children.

== Other media ==
A biopic starring Daniel de Oliveira and directed by Sandra Werneck called Cazuza: O Tempo não Para ("Cazuza: Time Doesn't Stop") was released in 2004.

In 2014, the biographic musical Cazuza – Pro Dia Nascer Feliz opened in São Paulo. It featured songs from Cazuza's solo career as well as from his time as frontman of Barão Vermelho. The musical starring Emílio Dantas was directed by João Fonseca and toured Brazil for two years.

Cazuza was portrayed by Jullio Reis in the 2025 Brazilian film Latin Blood: The Ballad of Ney Matogrosso, a biopic about Ney Matogrosso.

Cazuza is also depicted in the 2025 Globoplay documentary series Cazuza Além da Música, directed by Patrícia Guimarães.

== Discography ==
=== With Barão Vermelho ===
- 1982: Barão Vermelho 120,000 – Gold
- 1983: Barão Vermelho 2 180,000 – Gold
- 1984: Bete Balanço (Original Soundtrack)
- 1984: Maior Abandonado 800,000 – Platinum
- 1992: Barão Vermelho Ao Vivo

=== Solo ===
- 1985: Exagerado 750,000 – Platinum 2x
- 1987: Só Se For a Dois 600,000 – Platinum
- 1988: Ideologia 2,000,000 – Diamond
- 1988: O tempo não pára 1,800,000 – Diamond
- 1989: Burguesia 850,000 – Platinum 2x
- 1991: Por aí 600,000 – Platinum
- 2005: O Poeta Está Vivo – Ao Vivo no Teatro Ipanema 1987 250,000 – Platinum

== Films ==
- Bete Balanço, 1984
- Um Trem para as Estrelas, 1988
- Cazuza - O Tempo Não Pára, 2004 (biopic)
