= Frejat =

Brazilian musician, composer and singer

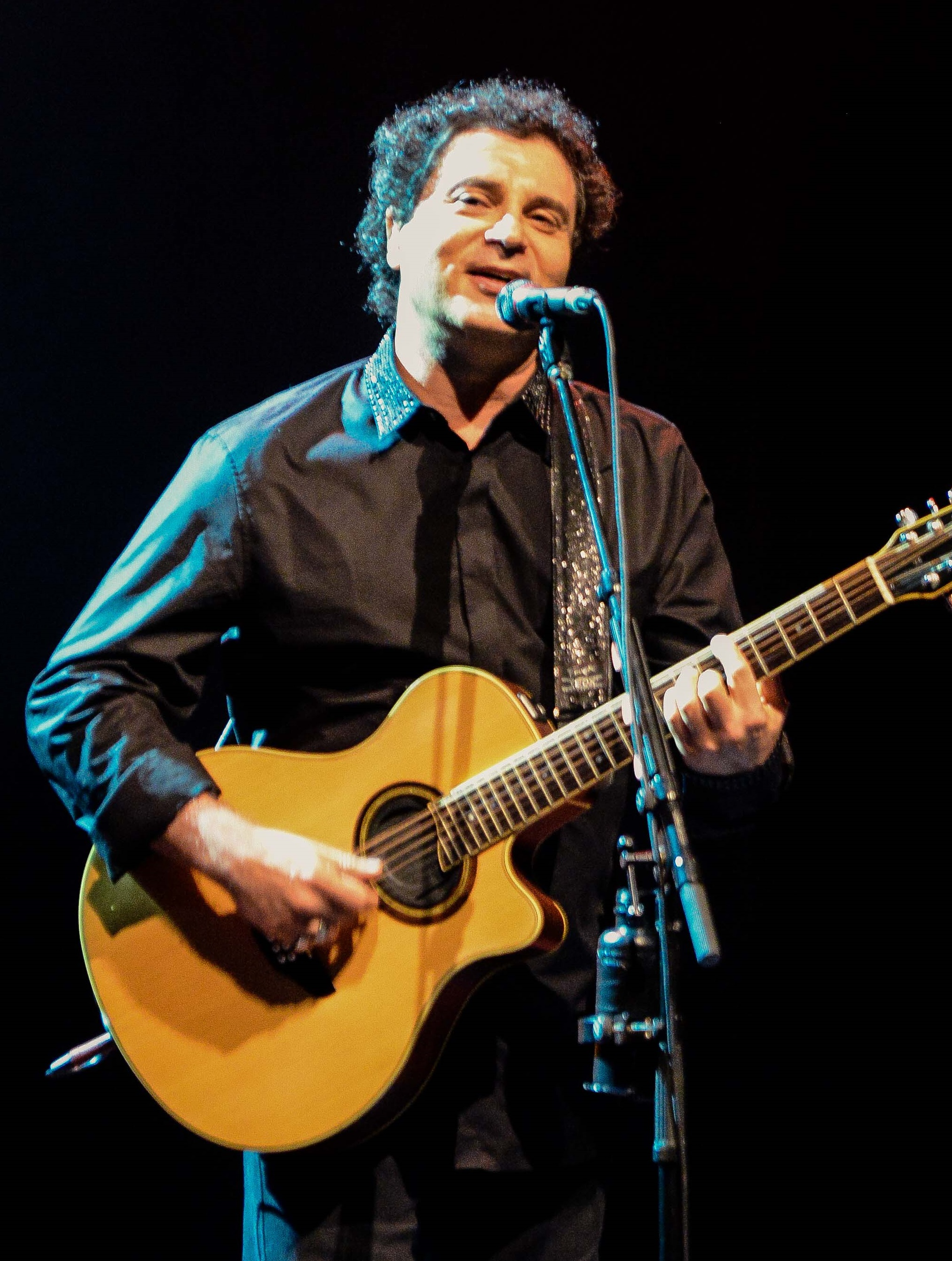
Frejat in March 2018

Roberto Frejat, better known as Frejat (born May 21, 1962) is a musician, composer, singer and co-founder of the band Barão Vermelho.

Frejat, who was born in Rio de Janeiro, is considered one of the most important people in the Brazilian Rock scene. He co-founded the band Barão Vermelho in 1981 playing the guitar and writing songs, then four years later he replaced Cazuza as lead vocalist in the band. He was in Barão Vermelho for 20 years before starting a solo career. He released two solo albums (in 2001 and 2003) before getting back together with Barão Vermelho. In January 2007 he played his last show with Barão Vermelho before they disbanded and is once again pursuing a solo career.

Several prominent artists have recorded cover versions of his compositions including: Caetano Veloso, Gal Costa, Cazuza, Cássia Eller and Ney Matogrosso.

== Discography ==
=== Solo ===
==== Studio albums ====
- (2001) Amor pra Recomeçar
- (2003) Sobre Nós Dois e o Resto do Mundo
- (2008) Intimidade Entre Estranhos
- (2020) Ao Redor do Precipício

=== Barão Vermelho ===
==== Studio albums ====
- (1982) Barão Vermelho
- (1983) Barão Vermelho 2
- (1984) Maior Abandonado
- (1986) Declare Guerra
- (1987) Rock'n Geral
- (1988) Carnaval
- (1989) Barão ao Vivo
- (1990) Na Calada da Noite
- (1992) Supermercados da Vida
- (1994) Carne Crua
- (1996) Álbum
- (1998) Puro Êxtase
- (2004) Barão Vermelho

==== Live albums ====
- (1989) Barão ao Vivo
- (1999) Balada MTV: Barão Vermelho
- (2005) MTV ao Vivo: Barão Vermelho
