= List of Discoteca Básica 500 Greatest Brazilian Music Records =

The 500 greatest Brazilian music records list was chosen through a vote conducted by the Discoteca Básica podcast. The top 10 were revealed in May 2022, and the book with the complete list was published in December of the same year.

== Voting ==
The voting was led by journalist Ricardo Alexandre, creator of the Discoteca Básica podcast, who consulted 162 experts from various fields, including journalists, YouTubers, podcasters, musicians, store owners, and producers. These included journalists like Nelson Motta, Jotabê Medeiros, Mauro Ferreira, and Sergio Martins, as well as producers and musicians such as Pupillo, Kassin, Leoni, Lampadinha, and André Abujamra. Each expert recommended 50 albums. It was the largest and most comprehensive LPs and CDs-related voting ever conducted in Brazil.

The final result was published in a book, financed through crowdfunding, in December 2022. The book's graphic design was done by Fernando Pires, former art editor of the magazine Bizz.

At the time of the list's publication, Discoteca Básica was considered the largest music podcast in Brazil, with nearly 1.5 million downloads in its first three seasons and ranking in the Top 10 of the category on all major streaming platforms in Brazil.

== List ==
The 500 greatest Brazilian albums of all time are displayed in the following chart.

Number	Title	Year	Artists
1	Clube da Esquina	1972	Milton Nascimento and Lô Borges
2	Acabou Chorare	1972	Novos Baianos
3	Chega de Saudade	1959	João Gilberto
4	Secos & Molhados	1973	Secos & Molhados
5	Construção	1971	Chico Buarque
6	A Tábua de Esmeralda	1974	Jorge Ben Jor
7	Tropicalia ou Panis et Circencis	1968	Caetano Veloso, Gilberto Gil, Gal Costa, Tom Zé, Os Mutantes, Nara Leão, Torquato Neto, Capinam, Rogério Duprat
8	Transa	1972	Caetano Veloso
9	Sobrevivendo no Inferno	1997	Racionais MC's
10	Elis & Tom	1974	Elis Regina and Tom Jobim
11	Cartola	1976	Cartola
12	Cabeça Dinossauro	1986	Titãs
13	Os Afro-Sambas	1966	Baden Powell and Vinicius de Moraes
14	Os Mutantes	1968	Os Mutantes
15	Fruto Proibido	1975	Rita Lee e Tutti Frutti
16	Alucinação	1976	Belchior
17	Da Lama ao Caos	1994	Chico Science and Nação Zumbi
18	Krig-ha, Bandolo!	1973	Raul Seixas
19	Carlos, Erasmo	1971	Erasmo Carlos
20	Tim Maia	1970	Tim Maia
21	Pérola Negra	1973	Luiz Melodia
22	Gal a Todo Vapor	1971	Gal Costa
23	Expresso 2222	1972	Gilberto Gil
24	Selvagem?	1986	Os Paralamas do Sucesso
25	Coisas	1965	Moacir Santos
26	Dois	1986	Legião Urbana
27	Tim Maia Racional, Vol. 1	1975	Tim Maia
28	Canções Praieiras	1954	Dorival Caymmi
29	Loki?	1975	Arnaldo Baptista
30	Samba Esquema Novo	1963	Jorge Ben Jor
31	Roberto Carlos	1971	Roberto Carlos
32	Falso Brilhante	1976	Elis Regina
33	A Divina Comédia ou Ando Meio Desligado	1970	Os Mutantes
34	Refazenda	1975	Gilberto Gil
35	Cartola	1974	Cartola
36	Estudando o Samba	1976	Tom Zé
37	Roots	1996	Sepultura
38	Maria Fumaça	1977	Banda Black Rio
39	Mutantes	1969	Os Mutantes
40	A História do Nordeste na voz de Luiz Gonzaga	1955	Luiz Gonzaga
41	Getz/Gilberto	1964	Stan Getz and João Gilberto
42	África Brasil	1976	Jorge Ben Jor
43	Beleléu, Leléu, Eu	1980	Itamar Assumpção
44	Refavela	1977	Gilberto Gil
45	A Mulher do Fim do Mundo	2015	Elza Soares
46	Clara Crocodilo	1980	Arrigo Barnabé
47	Afrociberdelia	1996	Chico Science and Nação Zumbi
48	Roberto Carlos em Ritmo de Aventura	1967	Roberto Carlos
49	Gal Costa	1969	Gal Costa
50	Caymmi e Seu Violão	1959	Dorival Caymmi
51	Minas	1975	Milton Nascimento
52	Usuário	1995	Planet Hemp
53	As Aventuras da Blitz	1982	Blitz
54	Caetano Veloso	1968	Caetano Veloso
55	Rita Lee	1980	Rita Lee
56	O Passo do Lui	1984	Os Paralamas do Sucesso
57	Bloco do Eu Sozinho	2001	Los Hermanos
58	Realce	1979	Gilberto Gil
59	Gal	1969	Gal Costa
60	Ventura	2003	Los Hermanos
61	Amoroso	1977	João Gilberto
62	Gilberto Gil	1968	Gilberto Gil
63	Tim Maia Racional, Vol. 2	1975	Tim Maia
64	The Composer of Desafinado, Plays	1963	Tom Jobim
65	Nó na Orelha	2011	Criolo
66	Verde Anil Amarelo Cor de Rosa e Carvão	1994	Marisa Monte
67	Nós Vamos Invadir sua Praia	1985	Ultraje a Rigor
68	Cinema Transcendental	1979	Caetano Veloso
69	Canção do Amor Demais	1958	Elizeth Cardoso
70	Zé Ramalho	1978	Zé Ramalho
71	João Gilberto	1973	João Gilberto
72	Angela Ro Ro	1979	Angela Ro Ro
73	Meus Caros Amigos	1976	Chico Buarque
74	Lado B Lado A	1999	O Rappa
75	Nervos de Aço	1973	Paulinho da Viola
76	Tempos Modernos	1982	Lulu Santos
77	Quem é Quem	1973	João Donato
78	Revoluções por Minuto	1985	RPM
79	Wave	1967	Tom Jobim
80	Cuban Soul:18 Kilates	1976	Cassiano
81	Legião Urbana	1985	Legião Urbana
82	Ogum Xangô	1975	Gilberto Gil and Jorge Ben Jor
83	Tim Maia	1971	Tim Maia
84	Todos os Olhos	1973	Tom Zé
85	À Procura da Batida Perfeita	2003	Marcelo D2
86	Revolver	1975	Walter Franco
87	A Dança da Solidão	1972	Paulinho da Viola
88	Jards Macalé	1972	Jards Macalé
89	Eu Quero É Botar meu Bloco na Rua	1973	Sérgio Sampaio
90	Raimundos	1994	Raimundos
91	Jardim Elétrico	1971	Os Mutantes
92	Caça à Raposa	1975	João Bosco
93	Guilherme Arantes	1976	Guilherme Arantes
94	Rap é Compromisso	2001	Sabotage
95	Álibi	1978	Maria Bethânia
96	Robson Jorge & Lincoln Olivetti	1982	Robson Jorge and Lincoln Olivetti
97	Matita Perê	1973	Tom Jobim
98	Os Tincoãs	1973	Os Tincoãs
99	Canta Canta, Minha Gente	1974	Martinho da Vila
100	Tribalistas	2002	Tribalistas
101	Chaos A.D.	1993	Sepultura
102	Circense	1980	Egberto Gismonti
103	Lô Borges	1972	Lô Borges
104	AmarElo	2019	Emicida
105	Vivendo e Não Aprendendo	1986	Ira!
106	Gita	1974	Raul Seixas
107	Milagre dos Peixes	1973	Milton Nascimento
108	Maior Abandonado	1984	Barão Vermelho
109	É Proibido Fumar	1964	Roberto Carlos
110	O Tempo Não Para	1988	Cazuza
111	Foi um Rio Que Passou em Minha Vida	1970	Paulinho da Viola
112	A Página do Relâmpago Elétrico	1977	Beto Guedes
113	Nara	1964	Nara Leão
114	Brasil	1989	Ratos de Porão
115	Nelson Cavaquinho	1973	Nelson Cavaquinho
116	Elis	1972	Elis Regina
117	Rita Lee	1979	Rita Lee
118	A Sétima Efervescência	1996	Júpiter Maçã
119	Ideologia	1988	Cazuza
120	Na Rua, Na Chuva, Na Fazenda	1988	Hyldon
121	Caetano Veloso	1969	Caetano Veloso
122	Samba Esquema Noise	1994	Mundo Livre S/A
123	Mais	1991	Marisa Monte
124	Duas Cidades	2016	BaianaSystem
125	Calango	1994	Skank
126	O Concreto Já Rachou	1986	Plebe Rude
127	Sua Majestade – o Rei do Ritmo	1960	Jackson do Pandeiro
128	Aracy de Almeida Apresenta Sambas de Noel Rosa	1954	Aracy de Almeida
129	Luz	1982	Djavan
130	Acústico MTV	2001	Cássia Eller
131	Som, Sangue e Raça	1971	Dom Salvador and Abolição
132	Chico Buarque	1978	Chico Buarque
133	Essa Tal de Gang 90 & Absurdettes	1983	Gang 90 & Absurdettes
134	Mamonas Assassinas	1995	Mamonas Assassinas
135	Olho de Peixe	1993	Lenine and Marcos Suzano
136	Urubu	1976	Tom Jobim
137	Slaves Mass	1977	Hermeto Pascoal
138	Barão Vermelho	1982	Barão Vermelho
139	O Canto da Cidade	1992	Daniela Mercury
140	Paêbirú	1976	Lula Côrtes e Zé Ramalho
141	O Inimitável	1968	Roberto Carlos
142	Previsão do Tempo	1973	Marcos Valle
143	Adoniran Barbosa	1974	Adoniran Barbosa
144	Molhado de Suor	1974	Alceu Valença
145	As Quatro Estações	1989	Legião Urbana
146	Gente da Antiga	1968	Pixinguinha, Clementina de Jesus, and João da Baiana
147	Psicoacústica	1988	Ira!
148	Roberto Carlos	1969	Roberto Carlos
149	Admirável Chip Novo	2003	Pitty
150	O Samba Poconé	1996	Skank
151	Geraes	1976	Milton Nascimento
152	Doces Bárbaros	1976	Doces Bárbaros (Maria Bethânia, Gilberto Gil, Caetano Veloso, and Gal Costa)
153	Imyra, Tayra, Ipy, Taiguara	1976	Taiguara
154	Gilberto Gil	1969	Gilberto Gil
155	Novo Aeon	1975	Raul Seixas
156	Cosmotron	2003	Skank
157	Espelho Cristalino	1978	Alceu Valença
158	MM	1989	Marisa Monte
159	Crucificados pelo Sistema	1984	Ratos de Porão
160	Pela Paz em Todo Mundo	1986	Cólera
161	Tropix	2016	Céu
162	De Pé no Chão	1978	Beth Carvalho
163	Vivo!	1976	Alceu Valença
164	Rádio Pirata Ao Vivo	1986	RPM
165	Tim Maia	1973	Tim Maia
166	Com Você... Meu Mundo Ficaria Completo	1999	Cássia Eller
167	Feminina	1980	Joyce
168	Que País É Este 1978/1987	1987	Legião Urbana
169	Preço Curto, Prazo Longo	1999	Charlie Brown Jr.
170	Di Melo	1975	Di Melo
171	D.J. Malboro Apresenta Funk Brasil	1989	various artists
172	Elza Soares, Baterista: Wilson das Neves	1968	Elza Soares and Wilson das Neves
173	Mutantes e Seus Cometas no País do Baurets	1972	Os Mutantes
174	O Amor, o Sorriso e a Flor	1960	João Gilberto
175	Arthur Verocai	1972	Arthur Verocai
176	O Grande Circo Místico (trilha sonora)	1983	Chico Buarque and Edu Lobo
177	A Peleja do Diabo com o Dono do Céu	1979	Zé Ramalho
178	66	2012	O Terno
179	Claridade	1975	Clara Nunes
180	Jorge Ben	1969	Jorge Ben Jor
181	Vida Bandida	1987	Lobão
182	Novos Baianos	1974	Novos Baianos
183	Quarteto Novo	1967	Quarteto Novo
184	Joia	1975	Caetano Veloso
185	Último Romântico	1985	Lulu Santos
186	Drama - Anjo Exterminado	1972	Maria Bethânia
187	Opinião de Nara	1964	Nara Leão
188	Criaturas da Noite	1975	O Terço
189	Araçá Azul	1973	Caetano Veloso
190	Mudança de Comportamento	1985	Ira!
191	Terra	1973	Sá, Rodrix e Guarabyra
192	Francis Albert Sinatra & Antonio Carlos Jobim	1967	Frank Sinatra and Tom Jobim
193	Transpiração Contínua Prolongada	1997	Charlie Brown Jr.
194	Õ Blésq Blom	1989	Titãs
195	Pânico em SP	1986	Inocentes
196	Snegs	1974	Som Nosso de Cada Dia
197	Qualquer Coisa	1975	Caetano Veloso
198	Manera Fru Fru, Manera: O Último Pau de Arara	1973	Fagner
199	Estúpido Cupido	1959	Celly Campello
200	Passado, Presente, Futuro	1972	Sá, Rodrix e Guarabyra
201	O Adeus de Fellini	1985	Fellini
202	Grito Suburbano	1982	Olho Seco, Inocentes, and Cólera
203	Jovem Guarda	1965	Roberto Carlos
204	Fullgás	1984	Marina Lima
205	São Paulo 1554/Hoje	1976	Joelho de Porco
206	Violeta de Outono	1987	Violeta de Outono
207	Lugar Comum	1975	João Donato
208	Krishnanda	1968	Pedro Santos
209	Dança das Cabeças	1977	Egberto Gismonti
210	Som Imaginário	1970	Som Imaginário
211	Cadê as Armas?	1986	As Mercenárias
212	Clementina de Jesus	1966	Clementina de Jesus
213	Matança do Porco	1973	Som Imaginário
214	Sociedade da Grã-Ordem Kavernista Apresenta Sessão das 10	1971	Raul Seixas, Sérgio Sampaio, Miriam Batucada, and Edy Star
215	Rappa Mundi	1996	O Rappa
216	A Bad Donato	1970	João Donato
217	20 Palavras ao redor do Sol	1979	Cátia de França
218	50 Anos de Chão	1988	Luiz Gonzaga
219	A Misteriosa Luta do Reino de Parassempre Contra o Império de Nuncamais	1969	Ronnie Von
220	Alceu Valença e Geraldo Azevedo	1972	Alceu Valença, and Geraldo Azevedo
221	Ou Não	1973	Walter Franco
222	Prelude	1973	Eumir Deodato
223	Na Pressão	1999	Lenine
224	The Astrud Gilberto album	1965	Astrud Gilberto
225	Garra	1971	Marcos Valle
226	Egito Madagascar	1987	Olodum
227	Tudo Foi Feito pelo Sol	1974	Os Mutantes
228	Tente Mudar o Amanhã	1985	Cólera
229	Aos Vivos	1995	Chico César
230	Ave Sangria	1974	Ave Sangria
231	Stone Flower	1971	Tom Jobim
232	A Banda Tropicalista do Duprat	1968	Rogério Duprat
233	Somos todos iguais nesta noite	1977	Ivan Lins
234	Estrangeiro	1989	Caetano Veloso
235	Barulhinho Bom - Uma Viagem Musical	1996	Marisa Monte
236	Uma Tarde na Fruteira	2008	Júpiter Maçã
237	Elis	1974	Elis Regina
238	A Máquina Voadora	1970	Ronnie Von
239	Seu Espião	1984	Kid Abelha
240	O Ritmo do Momento	1983	Lulu Santos
241	Voo de Coração	1983	Ritchie
242	Jesus Não Tem Dentes no País dos Banguelas	1987	Titãs
243	Nada como um Dia após o Outro Dia	2002	Racionais MC's
244	I Acto	1973	Zé Rodrix
245	Zabumbê-bum-á	1979	Hermeto Pascoal
246	Academia de Danças	1974	Egberto Gismonti
247	Alvorecer	1974	Clara Nunes
248	Cê	2006	Caetano Veloso
249	Água do Céu - Pássaro	1975	Ney Matogrosso
250	Corações Futuristas	1976	Egberto Gismonti and Academia de Danças
251	A Voz, o Violão, a Música de Djavan	1976	Djavan
252	Tanto Tempo	2000	Bebel Gilberto
253	Carnaval na Obra	1998	Mundo Livre S/A
254	Um Violão em Primeiro Plano	1971	Rosinha de Valença
255	Tem Que Acontecer	1976	Sérgio Sampaio
256	Secos & Molhados	1974	Secos & Molhados
257	Ao Vivo no Teatro João Caetano	1968	Elizeth Cardoso, Jacob do Bandolim, Zimbo Trio, and Conjunto Época de Ouro
258	Terra dos Pássaros	1980	Toninho Horta and Orquestra Fantasma
259	Disco Club	1978	Tim Maia
260	Cena de Cinema	1982	Lobão
261	Maravilhas Contemporâneas	1976	Luiz Melodia
262	Edu Lobo	1973	Edu Lobo
263	Televisão de Cachorro	1998	Pato Fu
264	A Revolta dos Dândis	1987	Engenheiros do Hawaii
265	É Ferro na Boneca	1970	Novos Baianos
266	Eu Vou p'ra Maracangalha	1957	Dorival Caymmi
267	Noel Rosa Pela Primeira Vez	2000	Noel Rosa
268	Bicho de Sete Cabeças	1993	Itamar Assumpção
269	Adoniran Barbosa	1975	Adoniran Barbosa
270	Maskavo Roots	1994	Maskavo Roots
271	Sampa Midnight - Isso Não Vai Ficar Assim	1985	Itamar Assumpção
272	Show Opinião	1965	Nara Leão, Zé Keti and João do Vale
273	O Canto dos Escravos	1982	Clementina de Jesus, Geraldo Filme and Tia Doca
274	Passarim	1987	Tom Jobim
275	Karnak	1995	Karnak
276	A Invasão do Sagaz Homem Fumaça	2000	Planet Hemp
277	Boca Livre	1979	Boca Livre
278	Cauby! Cauby!	1980	Cauby Peixoto
279	Mudei de Ideia	1971	Antônio Carlos e Jocáfi
280	Do Romance ao Galope Nordestino	1974	Quinteto Armorial
281	Cowboy do Asfalto	1990	Chitãozinho & Xororó
282	Ao Vivo (Montreux Jazz)	1979	Hermeto Pascoal
283	Cantando no Banheiro	1983	Eduardo Dussek
284	Cantar	1974	Gal Costa
285	Capital Inicial	1986	Capital Inicial
286	Se Acaso Você Chegasse	1960	Elza Soares
287	Lavô Tá Novo	1995	Raimundos
288	Sobre Todas as Forças	1994	Cidade Negra
289	Eu e Memê, Memê e Eu	1995	Lulu Santos
290	Ney Matogrosso	1981	Ney Matogrosso
291	Raio X Brasil	1993	Racionais MC's
292	O Terço	1970	O Terço
293	A Voz do Samba	1975	Alcione
294	Orós	1977	Fagner
295	Saúde	1981	Rita Lee and Roberto de Carvalho
296	Bicho	1977	Caetano Veloso
297	A Nova Dimensão do Samba	1964	Wilson Simonal
298	Almanaque	1981	Chico Buarque
299	Gal Tropical	1979	Gal Costa
300	Zeca Pagodinho	1986	Zeca Pagodinho
301	Manual ou Guia Livre de Dissolução dos Sonhos	2015	Boogarins
302	Cavalo de Pau	1982	Alceu Valença
303	Muito - Dentro da Estrela Azulada	1978	Caetano Veloso
304	Supercarioca	1988	Picassos Falsos
305	Do Cóccix até o Pescoço	2002	Elza Soares
306	Acústico MTV	1997	Titãs
307	Recomeçar	2017	Tim Bernardes
308	Catavento e Girassol	1996	Leila Pinheiro
309	As Canções Que Você Fez pra Mim	1993	Maria Bethânia
310	Velô	1984	Caetano Veloso
311	Orfeu da Conceição	1956	Tom Jobim and Vinicius de Moraes
312	Certa Manhã Acordei de Sonhos Intranquilos	2009	Otto
313	Cansei de Ser Sexy	2005	Cansei de Ser Sexy
314	Galos de Briga	1976	João Bosco
315	Imagem e Som	1971	Cassiano
316	Os Cães Ladram mas a Caravana Não Pára	1997	Planet Hemp
317	Ao Vivo em Tatuí	1992	Renato Teixeira, Pena Branca & Xavantinho
318	Maria Rita	2003	Maria Rita
319	Lar de Maravilhas	1975	Casa das Máquinas
320	Vibrações	1967	Jacob do Bandolim and his Group Época de Ouro
321	Convite para Ouvir Maysa	1956	Maysa
322	Severino	1994	Os Paralamas do Sucesso
323	Arise	1991	Sepultura
324	Feito em Casa	1977	Antonio Adolfo
325	Gol de Quem?	1995	Pato Fu
326	Índia	1973	Gal Costa
327	A Volta do Boêmio	1967	Nelson Gonçalves
328	Jackson do Pandeiro	1959	Jackson do Pandeiro
329	Babylon by Gus - Vol. I: O Ano do Macaco	2004	Black Alien
330	Tecnicolor	2000	Os Mutantes
331	Samba pra Burro	1998	Otto
332	Os Saltimbancos	1977	Chico Buarque
333	Caetano e Chico Juntos e Ao Vivo	1972	Caetano Veloso and Chico Buarque
334	Som Nosso	1977	Som Nosso de Cada Dia
335	Olorum	2020	Mateus Aleluia
336	Edison Machado é Samba Novo	1964	Edison Machado
337	Fala Mangueira!	1968	Cartola, Carlos Cachaça, Clementina de Jesus, Nelson Cavaquinho, and Odete Amaral
338	Sonhos e Memórias 1941-1972	1972	Erasmo Carlos
339	5 Companheiros	1958	Pixinguinha e os Chorões Daquele Tempo
340	Sambas de Caymmi	1955	Dorival Caymmi
341	Corra o Risco	1978	Olivia Byington
342	A Pescaria	1965	Erasmo Carlos
343	Novos Baianos F.C.	1973	Novos Baianos
344	Sinto Muito	2018	Duda Beat
345	Sobre Todas as Coisas	1991	Zizi Possi
346	Angels Cry	1993	Angra
347	Acústico MTV	2000	Capital Inicial
348	Sonho 70	1970	Egberto Gismonti
349	Corredor Polonês	1987	Patife Band
350	Toni Tornado	1971	Tony Tornado
351	Alumbramento	1980	Djavan
352	O Menino Que Queria Ser Deus	2018	Djonga and Coyote Beatz
353	Brasil	1981	João Gilberto, Caetano Veloso, Gilberto Gil e Maria Bethânia
354	Bicho de 7 Cabeças	1979	Geraldo Azevedo
355	O Futuro é Vortex	1986	Os Replicantes
356	Azimüth	1975	Azymuth
357	Ofertório	2018	Caetano Veloso, Moreno Veloso, Zeca Veloso, and Tom Veloso
358	A Música de Edu Lobo por Edu Lobo	1965	Edu Lobo
359	Alerta Geral	1978	Alcione
360	Ouro Negro	2001	Mario Adnet, Zé Nogueira, and Banda Ouro Negro
361	Tom Zé	1968	Tom Zé
362	Raça Humana	1984	Gilberto Gil
363	João Voz e Violão	2000	João Gilberto
364	Herb Alpert presents Sergio Mendes & Brazil 66	1966	Sérgio Mendes and Brasil 66
365	Sorriso Negro	1981	Dona Ivone Lara
366	Brasileirinho	2003	Maria Bethânia
367	Às Próprias Custas S.A	1983	Itamar Assumpção
368	De Volta ao Começo	1980	Gonzaguinha
369	Por Favor, Sucesso	1969	Liverpool
370	Moto Perpétuo	1974	Moto Perpétuo
371	Samba É no Fundo de Quintal	1980	Fundo de Quintal
372	Caetano Veloso	1971	Caetano Veloso
373	Feito pra Acabar	2010	Marcelo Jeneci
374	Little Electric Chicken Heart	2019	Ana Frango Elétrico
375	Cinema Mudo	1983	Os Paralamas do Sucesso
376	DeFalla	1987	DeFalla
377	Deus É Mulher	2018	Elza Soares
378	Voz e Suor	1983	Nana Caymmi and César Camargo Mariano
379	O Futuro Não Demora	2019	BaianaSystem
380	Música e Ciência	1988	Os Mulheres Negras
381	Pergunte a Quem Conhece	1989	Thaíde & DJ Hum
382	Ramilonga - A Estética do Frio	1997	Vitor Ramil
383	Educação Sentimental	1985	Kid Abelha
384	Lírou Quêiol en de Méd Bârds	1994	Little Quail and The Mad Birds
385	Amor Louco	1990	Fellini
386	Alô Malandragem, Maloca o Flagrante!	1986	Bezerra da Silva
387	Djavan ao Vivo	1999	Djavan
388	V	1991	Legião Urbana
389	Caymmi	1972	Dorival Caymmi
390	A Via-Láctea	1979	Lô Borges
391	Força Bruta	1970	Jorge Ben Jor
392	Ronnie Von	1969	Ronnie Von
393	Paulinho da Viola (1971 - disco 1) e Paulinho da Viola (1971 - disco 2)	1971	Paulinho da Viola
394	A Barca do Sol	1974	A Barca do Sol
395	Mel	1979	Maria Bethânia
396	Unplugged	1994	Gilberto Gil
397	Gal Canta Caymmi	1976	Gal Costa
398	Aprender a nadar	1974	Jards Macalé
399	Schizophrenia	1987	Sepultura
400	João Gilberto in Tokyo	2004	João Gilberto
401	Titãs	1984	Titãs
402	Antes do Fim	1986	Dorsal Atlântica
403	...Das Barrancas do Rio Gavião	1973	Elomar
404	Longe Demais das Capitais	1986	Engenheiros do Hawaii
405	Sobre Crianças, Quadris, Pesadelos e Lições de Casa...	2015	Emicida
406	Cantoria	1984	Elomar, Geraldo Azevedo, Vital Farias, and Xangai
407	O Dia em Que Faremos Contato	1997	Lenine
408	Rap Brasil	1995	Various artists
409	Johnny Alf	1965	Johnny Alf
410	Guilherme Lamounier	1973	Guilherme Lamounier
411	Amor de Índio	1978	Beto Guedes
412	Quanta	1997	Gilberto Gil
413	Bebadosamba	1996	Paulinho da Viola
414	Ben	1972	Jorge Ben Jor
415	Circuladô	1991	Caetano Veloso
416	O Filho de José e Maria	1977	Odair José
417	Brazilian Nuggets: Back from the Jungle, Volume 1	2011	Vários artistas
418	Radioatividade	1983	Blitz
419	Tropicália 2	1993	Caetano Veloso and Gilberto Gil
420	Hoje É o Primeiro Dia do Resto da Sua Vida	1972	Rita Lee
421	Manual Prático para Festas, Bailes e Afins - Vol. 1	1997	Ed Motta
422	Diletantismo	1983	Rumo
423	A Arca de Noé	1980	Vinicius de Moraes
424	Você Ainda Não Ouviu Nada!	1964	Sérgio Mendes and Bossa Rio
425	Mora na Filosofia dos Sambas de Monsueto	1962	Monsueto
426	Você Me Acende	1966	Erasmo Carlos
427	Build Up	1970	Rita Lee
428	Tom Zé	1972	Tom Zé
429	A Maestrina	2000	Chiquinha Gonzaga
430	Feijão com Arroz	1996	Daniela Mercury
431	Edu & Tom, Tom & Edu	1981	Edu Lobo and Tom Jobim
432	Efêmera	2010	Tulipa Ruiz
433	Camisa de Vênus	1983	Camisa de Vênus
434	Yamandú	2001	Yamandu Costa
435	Jorge Mautner	1974	Jorge Mautner
436	Sessão da Tarde	1985	Leo Jaime
437	São Paulo Confessions	1999	Suba
438	Deixa a Vida Me Levar	2002	Zeca Pagodinho
439	Trem Azul	1982	Elis Regina
440	Foi no Mês Que Vem	2013	Vitor Ramil
441	Quadra	2020	Sepultura
442	Alegria, Alegria Vol. 2 ou Quem Não Tem Swing Morre com a Boca Cheia de Formiga	1968	Wilson Simonal
443	Espelho	1977	João Nogueira
444	Dois Amigos, Um Século de Música	2015	Caetano Veloso and Gilberto Gil
445	Samba Minha Verdade, Minha Raiz	1978	Dona Ivone Lara
446	A Cor do Som	1977	A Cor do Som
447	Som Quente É o das Neves	1969	Wilson das Neves
448	Orlandivo	1977	Orlandivo
449	Cabeça de Nego	1986	João Bosco
450	Músicas para Churrasco, Vol. 1	2011	Seu Jorge
451	Entradas e Bandeiras	1976	Rita Lee and Tutti Frutti
452	Odair José	1973	Odair José
453	Vagarosa	2009	Céu
454	Coisa de Louco II	1995	Graforréia Xilarmônica
455	Metá Metá	2011	Metá Metá
456	...Em Pleno Verão	1970	Elis Regina
457	Omindá	2018	André Abujamra
458	Apresentamos Nosso Cassiano	1973	Cassiano
459	Eis o "Ôme"	1969	Noriel Vilela
460	Roberto Carlos	1970	Roberto Carlos
461	Acústico MTV	2002	Kid Abelha
462	Coração Selvagem	1977	Belchior
463	Tornado Muito Nervoso 2	2002	Various artists
464	A Fábrica do Poema	1994	Adriana Calcanhotto
465	As Próximas Horas Serão Muito Boas	2004	Cachorro Grande
466	Verde Que Te Quero Rosa	1977	Cartola
467	Orquestra Afro-Brasileira	1968	Orquestra Afro-Brasileira
468	Wilson Simonal Tem "Algo Mais"	1963	Wilson Simonal
469	Jackson do Pandeiro	1955	Jackson do Pandeiro
470	Boogie Naipe	2016	Mano Brown
471	Cássia Eller	1994	Cássia Eller
472	Roberto Carlos	1972	Roberto Carlos
473	Éter	2015	Scalene
474	Lilás	1984	Djavan
475	Brasil Mestiço	1980	Clara Nunes
476	Arthur Moreira Lima Interpreta Ernesto Nazareth	1975	Arthur Moreira Lima
477	Lá Vem o Brasil Descendo a Ladeira	1979	Moraes Moreira
478	Passarinho Urbano	1976	Joyce
479	Clube da Esquina 2	1978	Milton Nascimento
480	Frevo Mulher	1979	Amelinha
481	A Bossa Negra	1960	Elza Soares
482	Kleiton & Kledir	1981	Kleiton & Kledir
483	Despertar	1985	Guilherme Arantes
484	Não Fale com Paredes	1972	Módulo 1000
485	O Romance do Pavão Mysteriozo	1974	Ednardo
486	Atrás do Porto Tem uma Cidade	1974	Rita Lee e Tutti Frutti
487	Modo Livre	1974	Ivan Lins
488	MetaL MetaL	2012	Metá Metá
489	Nadadenovo	2004	Mombojó
490	Um Banda Um	1982	Gilberto Gil
491	Memórias Cantando	1976	Paulinho da Viola
492	São Paulo - Brasil	1977	Cesar Mariano & Cia
493	Imunidade Musical	2005	Charlie Brown Jr.
494	Legal	1970	Gal Costa
495	Saudade do Brasil	1980	Elis Regina
496	Emílio Santiago	1975	Emílio Santiago
497	Respire Fundo	1978	Walter Franco
498	Luar (A Gente Precisa Ver o Luar)	1981	Gilberto Gil
499	Matriz	2019	Pitty
500	Virgem	1987	Marina Lima

== List of voters ==
- Abelardo Mendes Jr.
- Agui Rocca
- Airton Leonardo de Oliveira Manoel
- Alessandra Braz
- Alessandro Andreola
- Alex Antunes
- Alexandre Kassin
- Alexandre Petillo
- Ana Maria Bahiana
- Ana Oliveira
- Ananda Zambi
- André Abujamra
- André Fiori
- Apollo 9
- Ariel Fagundes
- Ariston "Sal" Junior
- Astronauta Pinguim
- Ayrton Mugnaini Jr.
- Barral Lima
- Beatriz Helena Ramos Amaral
- Bento Araújo
- Beto Xavier
- Bruno Bock
- Bruno Capelas
- Bruno Cavalcanti
- Bruno Hiago
- Camila Fresca
- Camilo Rocha
- Carlos Albuquerque
- Carlos Marcelo
- Célio Albuquerque
- Celso Fonseca
- Celso Marcilio
- Chinaina
- Chris Fuscaldo
- Ciro David
- Coy Freitas
- Cristiano Bastos
- Cyz Mendes
- Dado Villa-Lobos
- Daniel Setti
- Danilo Casaletti
- Dante Longo Filho
- Didi Effe
- Didi Wagner
- Digão
- DJ Paulão
- Edgard Piccoli
- Edmundo Clairefont
- Eduardo Baptistão
- Emerson Gasperin
- Érika Martins
- Fabiano Calixto
- Fábio Bianchini
- Fabio Golfetti
- Felipe Ernani
- Felipe Rodarte
- Fernando Rosa
- Gabe Fortunato
- Gabriel Thomaz
- Giu Biondi
- Guilherme Bryan
- Guilherme Guedes
- Gustavo Bertoni
- Gustavo das Chagas
- Helio Flanders
- Henrique Machado
- Henrique Portugal
- Igor Miranda
- Igor Muller
- Indianara Gomes
- Isabela Yu
- Jamari França
- João Augusto
- João Ferreira
- João Paulo Gomiero
- João Augusto Lemos
- José Emilio Rondeau
- José Flávio Júnior
- José Julio do Espírito Santo
- José Norberto Flesch
- Jota Wagner
- Jotabê Medeiros
- Kamille Viola
- Lamps Lampadinha
- Leandro Pereira
- Leandro Saueia
- Leandro Souto Maior
- Leonardo Lichote
- Leonardo Oliveira
- Leonardo Vinhas
- Leoni
- Lô Borges
- Luan Gomes
- Luciana Xavier
- Luis Guimarães
- Luisa Micheletti
- Luiz Antonio Mello
- Luiz Calanca
- Luiz Felipe Carneiro
- Luiz Fernando Vieira
- Luiz Hygino
- Luiz Pimentel
- Marcelo Costa
- Marcelo Ferla
- Marcelo Froes
- Marcelo Gross
- Marcelo Toller
- Marco Bezzi
- Marcos Hermes
- Marcos Lauro
- Marcos Pinheiro
- Marcus Preto
- Maria Luisa Rodrigues
- Mariana Mafra
- Marko Mello
- Martin Mendonça
- Mateus Mondini
- Mauricio Gaia
- Mauro Ferreira
- Nelson Motta
- Octávio Schwenck Amorelli
- Otávio Rodrigues
- Pablo Miyazawa
- Paulo Thiago de Mello
- Pedro Alexandre Sanches
- Pedro Antunes
- Pedro Bial
- Pedro Chavedar
- Pupillo Oliveira
- Rafael Cortes
- Rafael d'Aquino Mafra
- Rafael Kent
- Rafael Ramos
- Ramon Vieira
- Regis Tadeu
- Renato Vieira
- Ricardo Alexandre
- Ricardo Schott
- Roberta Campos
- Roberta Martinelli
- Roberto Hais
- Roberto Maia
- Rodrigo Carneiro
- Rodrigo Faour
- Rodrigo Merheb
- Rodrigo Ortega
- Rodrigo Pinto
- Roger Lerina
- Sérgio Jomori
- Sérgio Martins
- Sidney Molina
- Silvio Essinger
- Tatiana B. Librelato
- Thomas Pappon
- Vera Magalhães
- Victor Mascarenhas
- Victor Persico de Oliveira Pinho
- William Floyd
- Zé Antonio Algodoal

== See also ==
- List of Rolling Stone Brasil 100 Greatest Brazilian Music Records (released in 2007)
