= 1982 in Latin music =

This is a list of notable events in Latin music (music from the Spanish- and Portuguese-speaking areas of Latin America, Latin Europe, and the United States) that took place in 1982.

== Events ==
- The first edition of the Juguemos a Cantar festival is launched in Mexico. It consisted of a competition between young singers below the age of 13, with the intent to seek out young talent; indeed, many of the children that performed on the three editions of the festival would go on to have successful music careers as adults.
- February 25: Claire Fischer wins the Grammy Award for Best Latin Recording at the 24th Annual Grammy Awards for "Guajira Pa' Me Jeva".
- November 27 – The 11th OTI Festival, held at the Coliseo Amauta in Lima, Peru, is won by the song "Puedes contar conmigo", written by Luis Gerardo Tovar and Carlos Moreán, and performed by Grupo Unicornio representing Venezuela.

== Notable singles ==
- Sandra Mihanovich: "Puerto Pollensa" (#1 in Argentina)
- Camilo Sesto": "Amor, no me ignores" (#1 in Mexico)
- Amanda Miguel: "Él me mintió" (#1 in Mexico)
- Amanda Miguel: "Mi buen corazón" (#1 in Mexico)
- Luis Miguel: "1+1=2 enamorados" (#1 in Mexico)
- Yuri: "La maldita primavera" (#1 in Argentina, Costa Rica, Mexico, Spain and Venezuela)
- Menudo: "Fuego" (#1 in Mexico)
- Paloma San Basilio: "Juntos" (#1 in Spain)
- Mecano: ""Me Colé en una Fiesta" (#1 in Spain)
- Alaska y Los Pegamoides: "Bailando" (#1 in Spain)
- Claudia Mori: "No Sucederá Más" (#1 in Spain)
- Julio Iglesias: "Nathalie" (#2 in Argentina)
- Mocedades: "Amor de Hombre" (#1 in Spain)
- Silvestre: "Ana, No Te Enamores de Mi" (#1 in Argentina)

== Album releases ==
- Lorenzo Antonio: Lorenzo Antonio
- Ramón Ayala y Los Bravos del Norte:
  - Mi Golondrina una Botella
  - Una Carta
- Ray Baretto: Rhythm of Life
- Rubén Blades and Willie Colón: The Last Fight
- Rita Lee and Roberto de Carvalho: Rita Lee & Roberto de Carvalho
- Bonny Cepeda: Arrasando Con Todo
- Willie Colón: Corazón Guerrero
- Tony Croatto: Jibaro
- Aida Cuevas: Canta Lo Nuevo de Juan Gabriel
- Guillermo Dávila: Guillermo Dávila
- Dulce: Heridas
- Rocío Dúrcal: Canta lo romántico de Juan Gabriel
- Vicente Fernández: ...Es la Diferencia
- José Feliciano: Escenas de Amor
- Julio Iglesias: Momentos
- Menudo
  - Por Amor
  - Una Aventura Llamada Menudo
- Los Bukis: Yo Te Necesito
- Machito: Machito and His Salsa Big Band '82
- Silvio Rodríguez: Unicornio
- José Luis Perales: Entre el agua y el fuego
- Perla: Confidencias
- Pimpinela: Pimpinela
- Camilo Sesto: Con Ganas
- Fernando Villalona: El Mayimbe
- Wilkins: Aventura
- Ednita Nazario: Ednita
- José José: Mi Vida
- Milly y los Vecinos: ¡Acabando!
- Lupita D'Alessio: Vieras Cuantas Ganas Tengo
- Lupita D'Alessio: Borraré Tu Nombre
- Pecos Kanvas: Fiel
- Juan Gabriel: Cosas de Enamorados
- Wilfrido Vargas and Sandy Reyes: Wilfrido Vargas and Sandy Reyes
- Bobby Valentín: Presenta A Él — Cano Estremera
- Johnny Ventura: El Sueño
- Nano Cabrera: Este Pueblo Tiene Sabor
- El Gran Combo de Puerto Rico: Nuestro Aniversario
- Los Invasores de Nuevo León: Aguanta Corazón
- Los Invasores de Nuevo León: Ni Dada La Quiero
- Roberto Torres y su Charanga Vallenata: Vol. III
- Miami Sound Machine: Río
- Elio Roca: Sólo Tu Amor Me Hace Feliz
- Fernando Sallaberry: Menudo Presenta A Fernando
- María Martha Serra Lima: Estilo
- La Mafia: The Magnificent 7
- La Mafia: Honey (Cariño)
- Sandro de América: Fue Sin Querer
- Lucía Méndez: Cerca de ti
- Bacchelli: Culpable
- José Luis Rodríguez: Dueño de nada
- Celia Cruz and La Sonora Matancera: Feliz Encuentro
- La Sonora Ponceña: Determination
- Willy Chirino: Chirinisimo
- Ray Conniff: Amor Amor
- Joan Sebastian: Así de Loco
- Rolando Laserie and Johnny Pacheco: De Película
- Los Tigres del Norte: Carrera Contra La Muerte
- Oscar D'León & Su Orquesta: El Discóbolo
- Marlene: Marlene
- Los Chamos: Siempre Te Amaré
- Los Freddy's: El Tren
- Rodolfo Aicardi: Que Chevere, Vol. 3
- Los Cadetes de Linares
  - Me Voy Amor
  - Un Viejo Amor
- Los Barón de Apodaca: A Cada Rato
- Mazz: Pesado
- Antonio Cabán Vale: Cantos de Altura
- Marvin Santiago: El Hijo del Pueblo
- Willie Rosario: Atizame el Fogón
- Lourdes & Carlos: Lourdes y Carlos
- Daniel Santos: Introducción y El Borracho No Vale
- Rafael Solano: Los Galleros
- Los Tigres Del Norte: Carrera Contra la Muerte
- Los Humildes: X Aniversario
- Lucha Villa: De Parte de Quien
- Soledad Bravo: Caribe
- Chucho Avellanet: Yo Siento... Yo Canto
- Diego Verdaguer: Coco Loco
- Ricchi e Poveri: Me enamoro de ti
- Roberto Carlos: Roberto Carlos' 82/Amiga
- Emmanuel: Tú y yo
- Estela Raval: Tributo a Mis Amigos
- Mazz: Command Performance
- Roberto Pulido: Envidias
- Flaco Jiménez: El Gran
- Rigo Tovar: Rigo En Serenata
- Rigo Tovar: 10 Años Tropicalisimo
- Luis Miguel: Un sol
- Luis Miguel: Directo al corazón
- Luis "Perico" Ortiz: Sabroso
- Miguel Poventud: Eres Todo En Mi
- Jossie Esteban y la Patrulla 15: Jossie Esteban y la Patrulla 15
- Plácido Domingo: Adoro
- Andy Montañez: Solo Boleros
- Leo Dan: Tengan Cuidado
- Roberto Roena: Super Apollo 47:50
- La India de Oriente" Buenos Dias Africa
- Danny Daniel (es): El amor, amor
- Tommy Olivencia & Su Orquesta: Un Triángulo De Triunfo!
- Johnny Pacheco and José Fajardo: Pacheco y Fajardo
- Alfredo "Chocolate" Armenteros: Dice
- Ismael Miranda: Exitos de los 50
- Vicentico Valdés and la Orquesta Bobby Valentin: Vicentico Valdés y la Orquesta Bobby Valentin
- Iva Zanicchi: Yo, por amarte
- Manolo Otero: Cantando
- Raquel Olmedo: La Fuerza De Una Voz Que Impone el Cambio
- Víctor Yturbe: El Siempre Romántico
- Fernando Villalona¡Feliz Cumbe!
- Cuco Valoy & Los Virtuosos: Chevere
- Claudia de Colombia: Paraíso
- Mecano: Mecano
- Blitz: As Aventuras da Blitz
- Miguel Ríos: Rock & Ríos
- Mocedades: Amor De Hombre
- Barón Rojo: Volumen brutal
- Kin-Lalat: Ixim K'in Q'aaQ
- Luis Alberto Spinetta: Kamikaze
- Sonora Dinamita: La Cumbia Nació en Barú
- Mercedes Sosa: Mercedes Sosa en Argentina
- Lucila Campos and Óscar Avilés: Valseando Festejo
- Jaime Roos: Siempre son las cuatro
- Charly García: Yendo de la cama al living
- Lulu Santos: Tempos Modernos
- Robson Jorge and Lincoln Olivetti: Robson Jorge & Lincoln Olivetti
- Djavan: Luz
- Barão Vermelho: Barão Vermelho
- Olho Seco, Inocentes, and Cólera: Grito Suburbano
- Lobão: Cena de Cinema
- Clementina de Jesus, Geraldo Filmek, and Tia Doca: O Canto dos Escravos
- Alceu Valença: Cavalo de Pau
- Elis Regina: Trem Azul
- Gilberto Gil: Um Banda Um

== Births ==
- March 7 – Aarón Díaz, Mexican actor and singer
- November 3 – Raquel del Rosario, Spanish vocalist

== Deaths ==
- January 19 – Elis Regina, Brazilian singer, 36 (overdose)
- May 5 – Cal Tjader, American Latin jazz musician, 56 (heart attack)
- September 12 – Federico Moreno Torroba, Spanish composer and conductor, 91
