= Meus Caros Amigos =

Studio album by Chico Buarque
- Released: 1976
- Genre: MPB
- Length: 34:12
- Label: Phonogram; Philips (LP and CD until 1998) Universal Music (CD from 1999)
- Producer: Sérgio de Carvalho

Chico Buarque chronology
Chico Buarque & Maria Bethânia Ao Vivo (1975)	Meus Caros Amigos (1976)	Os Saltimbancos (1977)

Meus Caros Amigos is the twelfth album by Brazilian singer-songwriter Chico Buarque, released in 1976 as a result of a partnership between Phonogram Inc. and Philips Records.

== Background ==
Chico Buarque's twelfth work, the album features Milton Nascimento on the track O Que Será? (A Flor da Pele) and compositions with Augusto Boal, Ruy Guerra and Francis Hime. The song struggled to pass the censorship imposed by Brazil's military dictatorship, and was only released at the last minute by the regime.

With a strong intersection between Chico's work and other forms of artistic expression, Mulheres de Atenas was written by Chico and Augusto Boal for Boal's play Lisa, a Mulher Libertadora. Vai Trabalhar, Vagabundo was composed by Chico for the film of the same name by director Hugo Carvana. The songs Passaredo and A Noiva da Cidade were written by Chico and Francis Hime for the movie A Noiva da Cidade by Alex Viany. Basta um Dia was written by Chico for the play Gota d'Água, which he co-wrote with Paulo Pontes.

The record labels Phonogram Inc. and Philips Records teamed up to make the recording possible.

== Reception ==
=== Release ===
The album was launched at the Carlos Gomes Theater in central zone of Rio de Janeiro in Long Play format. In 1989, the album was released on CD.

=== Sales ===
According to Jornal do Brasil, a newspaper based in Rio de Janeiro, the album sold 100,000 copies in just one week. The Folha de S. Paulo newspaper reported that in the city of São Paulo, the album was selling more than Roberto Carlos' album over the Christmas period in the city center. Carlos was seen as the biggest commercial success at the time. According to Jornal do Brasil, the album had sold more than 300,000 copies in Brazil by 27 January 1980.

=== Critical reception ===
Spencer Fernando for the newspaper Diário de Pernambuco gave the album a positive review, praising it as one of the "best albums of the year". Fernando adds: "The album closes with the anthological ‘Meu Caro Amigo’ with Francis Hime. A piece of fine irony, with imagination and creativity. [...] Without a doubt: it's the record of the year."

The Correio Braziliense newspaper gave the album a mixed review. For the newspaper, Chico's duet with Milton Nascimento is a "masterpiece" but about the album as a whole, the newspaper comments "the album in terms of musical proposal is not revolutionary. It's simply an evolutionary process for the composer, which in itself is highly important for MPB. [...] Many people must now be having the pleasure of listening to Meus Caros Amigos, which, if it doesn't have any major significance, is at least one more piece of data in the history of MPB."

== Legacy ==
In 2003, MTV Magazine, run by MTV Brasil, brought together 52 journalists, artists and music experts to choose the 100 greatest albums in Brazilian history. The album Meus Caros Amigos came in thirty-second place.

In October 2007, the Brazilian version of Rolling Stone magazine voted the album into forty-first place in its poll of the 100 greatest albums in Brazilian music.

In a poll of the 500 greatest Brazilian albums conducted by the Discoteca Básica podcast, which featured more than 160 music experts, the album was ranked as the 73rd most important album in Brazilian music, making it Chico's second highest-ranking album after Construção.

In 2024, the Universal label released a new, reissued version of the LP, in honor of Chico Buarque's 80th birthday, in an opaque cream version.

== Track listing ==
Track Listing
No.	Title	Writer(s)	Participation	Length
1.	"O Que Será (À Flor da Pele)"	Chico Buarque	Milton Nascimento	2:46
2.	"Mulheres de Atenas"	Chico Buarque, Augusto Boal		4:20
3.	"Olhos Nos Olhos"	Chico Buarque		4:33
4.	"Você Vai Me Seguir"	Chico Buarque, Ruy Guerra		3:15
5.	"Vai Trabalhar Vagabundo"	Chico Buarque		2:15
6.	"Corrente"	Chico Buarque		4:23
7.	"A Noiva da Cidade"	Chico Buarque, Francis Hime		3:48
8.	"Passaredo"	Francis Hime, Chico Buarque		2:09
9.	"Basta Um Dia"	Chico Buarque		2:17
10.	"Meu Caro Amigo"	Chico Buarque, Francis Hime	Altamiro Carrilho, Dino 7 Cordas	4:21
Total length:				34:14

== Personnel ==
The musicians worked on this record:

- Francis Hime – piano, arrangements (tracks 1, 3, 5, 7, 8, 9, 10)
- Luiz Cláudio Ramos– acoustic guitar (tracks 2, 3), viola and arrangements ("Mulheres de Atenas")
- Luizão Maia – bass (tracks 1, 3, 5)
- Antonio Adolfo – piano (tracks 4, 6)
- Dino 7 Cordas – seven-string guitar ("Meu Caro Amigo")
- Altamiro Carrilho – flute ("Meu Caro Amigo")
- Abel Ferreira – clarinet ("Meu Caro Amigo")
- Alceu Maia – cavaquinho ("Meu Caro Amigo")
- Joel Nascimento – mandolin ("Meu Caro Amigo")
- Neco – acoustic guitar ("Meu Caro Amigo")
- Perinho Albuquerque – acoustic guitar, arrangements (tracks 4, 6)
- Arthur Verocai – acoustic guitar (tracks 1, 5, 7, 8)
- Sérgio Barrozo – bass (tracks 2, 7, 8)
- Moacyr Albuquerque – bass (tracks 4, 6)
- Elber Bedack – drums (tracks 1, 5, 7, 8)
- Enéas Costa – drums (tracks 4, 6)
- Áureo de Souza – drums ("Mulheres de Atenas"), percussion (tracks 1, 5, 7, 8)
- Papão – drums ("Olhos Nos Olhos")
- Hermes Contesini – percussion (tracks 1, 5, 8)
- Ariovaldo Contesini – percussion (tracks 1, 2, 5, 8)
- Djalma Corrêa – percussion (tracks 2, 3)
- Milton Nascimento – vocals ("O Que Será? (À Flor da Terra)")
- MPB-4 – backing vocals ("Você Vai Me Seguir")
- Miúcha, Olívia Hime, Bebel Gilberto, Bee de Campos, Telma Costa – backing vocals ("Mulheres de Atenas", "A Noiva da Cidade")
- Celso Woltzenlogel, Jorginho Ferreira, Franklin da Flauta – flutes ("Mulheres de Atenas")
