= Célia =

Brazilian singer (1947–2017)

- Born: Célia Regina Cruz; September 8, 1947; São Paulo, Brazil
- Died: September 29, 2017 (aged 70) São Paulo, Brazil
- Genres: MPB; Soul; Funk; Samba
- Instrument: Vocals
- Years active: 1970–2012
- Labels: Continental; Pointer; Velas; Jam Music; Lua Music; Som Livre; Abril Cultural

Célia Regina Cruz (September 8, 1947 – September 29, 2017), known mononymously as Célia, was a Brazilian singer.

== Career ==
Célia began her musical career on the TV show Um Instante, Maestro! in 1970, debuting her self-titled album, which was produced with Discos Continental. It featured songs from songwriters including Rogério Duprat, Joyce, Lô Borges, Ivan Lins, and Nelson Angelo. Her second album, released in 1972, which was also self-titled, featured songs written by Marcos Valle, Erasmo Carlos, and Tom Jobim. Both albums were arranged by Arthur Verocai, on whose self-titled album she appeared on the track "Seriado".

Célia performed in Italy, France, Brazil, and other countries in Latin America. At one point, she performed in Monaco for Prince Rainier III. She also hosted the TV show Qual é a Música? for some time.

Célia's greatest success in Brazil was for her cover of "Onde Estão Os Tamborins?", or "Where Are The Tamborins?" in English, which was released as a single in 1975. She was also well known for her cover of "Adeus Batucada," or "Farewell Batucada" in English.

Since album repressings by Mr Bongo and Warner Music and the sampling of her recording "David" in "Opaul" by rapper Freddie Dredd, Célia has seen a resurgence of popularity, particularly among younger generations.

== Death ==
Célia died in 2017 due to lung cancer, after being hospitalized for a month.

== Discography ==
=== Albums ===
- Célia (1970)
- Célia (1972)
- Célia (1975)
- Célia (1977)
- Amor (1982)
- Meu Caro (1983)
- Louca De Saudade (1993)
- Pra Fugir Da Saudade – Canções De Paulinho Da Viola (2000)
- Faço No Tempo Soar Minha Sílaba (2007)
- O Lado Oculto Das Canções – Célia 40 Anos (2010)
- Outros Românticos (2012)
- Aquilo Que A Gente Diz (2015)

=== Singles ===
- Adeus Batucada / Blues (1970)
- Nasci Numa Manhã De Carnaval / Sem Palavras (1971)
- A Hora É Essa / Na Boca Do Sol (1972)
- Badalação (Bahia, Volume 2) / Detalhes (1972)
- Detalhes / Em Familia (1973)
- Ponto De Encontro / É Tempo De Matar Saudade (1973)
- Azucri / Tatuagem (1974)
- Onde Estão Os Tamborins / Pomba Branca (1975)
- Guarânia Guarani / Fogo, Por Favor (1981)
- Brasil Canta Na Itália (1984)
- A Hora é Essa / Ei, Você, Psiu! (2016)
- Zózoio Como É Que É / Para Lennon E McCartney (2017)
- Dominus Tecum / Vida De Artista (unknown)
- Badalação (Bahia Vol. 2) / Dez Bilhões De Neurônios (unknown)

=== EPs ===
- No Clarão Da Lua Cheia (1971)
- O Rei Que Não Sabia De Nada (1982)

=== Compilations ===
- 15 Anos (1986)
- Célia (2011)
