= Garra (album) =

Studio album by Marcos Valle
- Released: 1971
- Recorded: 1971
- Genre: MPB • soul • samba • bossa nova
- Length: 33:17
- Label: Odeon
- Producer: Milton Miranda

Marcos Valle chronology
Marcos Valle (1970)	Garra (1971)	Vento Sul (1972)

Garra is an album by Brazilian musician Marcos Valle, in the Música popular brasileira genre, released in 1971 by the Odeon record label.

== Production and release ==
Valle, with his brother, Paulo Sérgio Valle, joined the Odeon Records to produce Garra. It was released in 1971 by Odeon as an LP record. In 2001, a compact disc (CD) version was also released in Japan by Odeon. In the United States, in 2013, a new version was released on LP and another on CD by Light In The Attic Records.

== Critical reception and legacy ==
John Bush, writing for AllMusic called the album "a Baroque masterpiece of easy listening Brazilian pop, … the most entertaining album of [sic] Marco's career, and perhaps the best Brazilian pop album of all time." Bush noted that "nearly every song has a bridge as strong as — or stronger than — the main melody", praising the album and stating that it was a "masterpiece". Journalist Mauro Ferreira, in his blog on G1, stated that the album marks "Valle's embrace of soul music."

Josh Tautz and Felipe Mejia, writing for The Vinyl Factory, praised the album, calling it "a Brazilian pop masterpiece, featuring some first rate studio musicians and arrangers", while calling the title track "gorgeous baroque pop". The album ranked 225th on a list of the 500 greatest Brazilian albums, in a poll of more than 160 music experts conducted by the Discoteca Básica podcast. The album was one of two works by Valle mentioned on the list, along with Previsão do Tempo which ranked 142nd.

== Track listing ==
All lyrics are written by Paulo Sérgio Valle; all music is composed by Marcos Valle, except where noted.

No.	Title	Music	Length
1.	"Jesus Meu Rei" (Jesus My King)		3:12
2.	"Com Mais de 30" (With More Than 30)		2:44
3.	"Garra" (Talon)		2:59
4.	"Black Is Beautiful"		4:18
5.	"Ao Amigo Tom" (To My Friend Tom)	Osmar Milito, M. Valle	2:02
6.	"Paz e Futebol" (Peace and Football)		2:34
7.	"Que Bandeira" (What a Giveaway)	Mariozinho Rocha, M. Valle	3:04
8.	"Wanda Vidal"		2:09
9.	"Minha Voz Virá do Sol da América" (My Voice Will Come from the Sun of the Americas)		4:23
10.	"Vinte e Seis Anos de Vida Normal" (Twenty-Six Years of Normal Life)		2:25
11.	"O Cafona" (The Tacky Guy)		3:27
Total length:			33:17

== Personnel ==
The following musicians worked on the album:

- Marcos Valle: Vocals, Piano
- Robertinho Silva: Drums
- Dom Salvador: Organ, Harpsichord
- Capacete: Electric Bass
- Geraldo Vespar: Guitar, Arrangers
- Marizinha: Vocals on "Black Is Beautiful"
