= Carlos, Erasmo... =

Carlos, Erasmo

Studio album by Erasmo Carlos
- Released: 1971
- Genres: MPB, rock, soul, funk, psychedelia, samba rock
- Language: Portuguese
- Label: Philips
- Producers: Manoel Barenbein, Erasmo Carlos, Nelson Motta

Erasmo Carlos chronology
Erasmo Carlos e os Tremendões (1970)	Carlos, Erasmo (1971)	Sonhos e Memórias (1972)

Carlos, Erasmo is the seventh studio album by Brazilian musician Erasmo Carlos. Released in 1971, it was the singer's first album under the Philips label. It is considered one of the most important albums of his career and a classic of Brazilian rock.

== Background ==
According to cultural journalist André Barcinski, the album Carlos, Erasmo symbolizes a shift in Erasmo Carlos' career, following his success with the Jovem Guarda. After leaving his record label, RGE, he moved to Phillips, seeking new paths for his career.

== Track listing ==
All tracks are written by Erasmo Carlos and Roberto Carlos, except where noted.

Side A

No.	Title	Writer(s)	Length
1.	"De Noite na Cama"	Caetano Veloso	3:21
2.	"Masculino, Feminino (with Marisa Fossa)"	Homero Moutinho Filho	4:38
3.	"É Preciso Dar Um Jeito, Meu Amigo"		3:49
4.	"Dois Animais na Selva Suja da Rua"	Taiguara	3:11
5.	"Gente Aberta"	José Messias	2:23
6.	"Agora Ninguém Chora Mais"	Jorge Ben Jor	2:39

Side B

No.	Title	Writer(s)	Length
7.	"Sodoma e Gomorra"		2:20
8.	"Mundo Deserto"		2:35
9.	"Não Te Quero Santa"	Saulo Nunes, Sergio Fayne, Vítor Martins	2:48
10.	"Ciça, Cecília"		3:38
11.	"Em Busca das Canções Perdidas Nº 2"	Fábio, Paulo Imperial	2:47
12.	"26 Anos de Vida Normal"	Marcos Valle, Paulo Sérgio Valle	2:21
13.	"Maria Joana (with Caribe Steel Band)"		3:49

== Legacy ==
In Rolling Stone Brasil's list of the 100 greatest Brazilian albums, organized by the Brazilian edition of the American magazine, “Carlos, Erasmo” ranked 31st, being the only album by Erasmo on the list.

The list of the 500 greatest Brazilian albums was chosen by a voting process conducted by the podcast Discoteca Básica, with votes from over 160 music experts. “Carlos, Erasmo” came in 19th place, the highest ranking for an Erasmo album on the list. Three other Erasmo albums also appear on the list.

The song "É preciso dar um jeito meu amigo" was included in Walter Salles' film I'm Still Here in 2024, the first Brazilian film to win an Oscar. The movie narrates the struggle of Eunice Paiva during the Brazilian dictatorship and stars Fernanda Torres and Selton Mello. Its inclusion in the film led to an increase in the song's popularity, propelling it to streaming charts in Brazil. Fernanda Torres, who portrayed Eunice Paiva in the film, emphasized the importance of the song in the film's narrative, noting how it captured the essence of resistance during the dictatorship.

Roberto and Erasmo Carlos' collaboration on the song was highlighted by its inclusion in the soundtrack to I'm Sitll Here, illustrating the continued impact of their compositions on Brazilian music. Two years after Erasmo Carlos's death on November 22, 2022, the song re-entered the charts, reaching the third position on Spotify's "50 that went viral - Brazil" list and the second spot on Shazam. This resurgence demonstrates the song's ongoing relevance in Brazilian culture.
