= Miyazawa =

Miyazawa is a Japanese surname. Notable people with the surname include:

- Emma Miyazawa (born 1988), Japanese actress
- Hinata Miyazawa (宮澤 ひなた; born 1999), Japanese women's footballer
- Kazufumi Miyazawa (born 1966), Japanese musician
- Kenji Miyazawa (1896–1933), Japanese poet and author of children's literature
- Kiichi Miyazawa (1919–2007), 78th Prime Minister of Japan
- Pablo Miyazawa, Brazilian journalist
- Rie Miyazawa (born 1973), actress and singer
- Sae Miyazawa (born 1990), former Japanese idol and former member of Japanese girl group AKB48
- Takashi Miyazawa (born 1978), Japanese professional cyclist
- Takeshi Miyazawa (born 1978), Canadian comic book artist
- Yuki Miyazawa (宮澤 夕貴; born 1993), Japanese women's basketball player
- Iori Miyazawa (宮澤 伊織), Japanese author of Otherside Picnic

== Fictional characters ==
- Yukino Miyazawa, the female protagonist of the anime and manga series Kare Kano
- Yukine Miyazawa, a character in the visual novel Clannad
- Alice Miyazawa, minor character in The Trials of Apollo.
