= Late Again =

Late Again may refer to:

- Late Again (album), a studio album by folk trio, Peter, Paul and Mary.
- Late Again (musician), Brazilian-American dream pop musician.
- "Late Again", the opening track of Stealers Wheel's eponymous album.
- "Late Again", a song by Judie Tzuke from the album, Shoot the Moon.
- "Late Again (Gettin' Over You)", a song by Kris Kristofferson from the album, Spooky Lady's Sideshow.
- "Late Again", a song by the Sparkletones.
- "Late Again", an episode from the second season of the British television sitcom, On the Buses.
