= Cartola II =

Studio album by Cartola
- Released: 1976
- Genre: Samba
- Length: 34:45
- Label: Discos Marcus Pereira
- Producer: Juarez Barroso

Cartola chronology
Cartola (1974)	Cartola II (1976)	Verde Que Te Quero Rosa (1977)

Cartola II is the second studio album by the Brazilian composer and samba musician Cartola, released in 1976 by the record label Discos Marcus Pereira.

== Background ==
Produced by Juarez Barroso, Cartola's second studio album, Chegou, was released in 1976. Barroso died a month before the release, making it his last work as a producer. Featuring a selection of the singer's most famous songs, such as "O Mundo é um moinho", "Peito vazio", and "Sei Chorar", the album includes two tracks featuring his daughter, Creusa: "Sala de Recepção" and "Ensaboa".

The album launch took place in the auditorium of the Brazilian Press Association (ABI) in downtown Rio de Janeiro.

== Reception ==
The radio broadcaster and music journalist wrote a positive review in the Rio de Janeiro newspaper Jornal do Brasil, stating that "his new LP, with previously unreleased sambas and tributes to old compositions, is one of the best of the year and deserves the attention of both samba aficionados and those less familiar with the genre". Also in an article published in Jornal do Brasil, José Ramos Tinhorão called the album "flawless," adding that "not only is the repertoire of the highest caliber, but Cartola himself surpasses it, pouring himself into the exquisite lyricism of samba!"

Flávio Marinho, writing for Manchete magazine, praised the album as "a samba whose beauty lies in the simplicity of its conception and the immediate power of its communication".

== Legacy ==
In 2003, Revista MTV, edited by MTV Brazil and published by Editora Abril, ranked the album as the 13th best Brazilian album of all time. In 2007, the Brazilian edition of Rolling Stone magazine published a list of the 100 greatest Brazilian albums, in which this album ranked eighth.

In 2016, the album was reissued in a remastered version on CD, released by Universal Music. The following year, Polysom re-released the album in LP format.

In a poll of the 500 greatest Brazilian albums conducted by the Discoteca Básica podcast, which featured more than 160 music experts, the album was ranked as the 11th most important album in Brazilian music.

== Track listing ==
Side A
No.	Title	Writer(s)	Length
1.	"O Mundo É um Moinho"	Cartola	3:53
2.	"Minha"	Cartola	2:16
3.	"Sala de Recepção" (with: Creusa)	Cartola	3:24
4.	"Não Posso Viver Sem Ela"	Cartola, Bide	2:40
5.	"Preciso Me Encontrar"	Candeia	2:57
6.	"Peito Vazio"	Cartola, Elton Medeiros	2:50
Total length:			18:00

Side B
No.	Title	Writer(s)	Length
1.	"Aconteceu"	Cartola	3:53
2.	"As Rosas não Falam"	Cartola	2:51
3.	"Sei Chorar"	Cartola	2:26
4.	"Ensaboa" (participação: Creusa)	Cartola	3:24
5.	"Senhora Tentação"	Silas de Oliveira	3:03
6.	"Cordas de Aço"	Cartola	2:15
Total length:			17:52

== Personnel ==
The following musicians worked on the album:

- Cartola: vocals;
- Creusa: vocals;
- Dino 7 Cordas: guitar;
- Jayme Thomás Florence: guitar;
- Canhoto do Cavaquinho: cavaquinho;
- Altamiro Carrilho: flute;
- Abel Ferreira: saxophone.

== Certifications ==
Certifications for "Cartola II"
Region	Certification	Certified units/sales
Brazil (Pro-Música Brasil)	Gold	100,000^{‡}
^{‡} Sales+streaming figures based on certification alone.
