= Adolfo Fernández =

Adolfo Fernández may refer to:

- Adolfo Fernández (actor) (1958–2025), Spanish actor
- Adolfo Fernández Bustamante (1898–1957), Mexican screenwriter and film director
- Adolfo Fernández Casanova (1843/1844–1915), Spanish architect, restored the Castle of Almodóvar del Río
- Adolfo Fernández Cavada (1832–1871), Cuban-American soldier and diplomat
- Adolfo Fernández Díaz (born 1993), Spanish footballer
- Adolfo Fernández (pianist) (born 1951), Cuban pianist and journalist
- Adolfo Fernández Sainz (born 1947), Cuban journalist
