= Pedro Sorongo =

Brazilian musician (1919–1993)

- Born: Pedro Mello dos Santos; October 2, 1919; Rio de Janeiro, Brazil
- Died: February 23, 1993 (aged 73); Rio de Janeiro, Brazil
- Occupation: Musician · percussionist · visual artist
- Notable work: Krishnanda (1968)
- Military career
- Allegiance: Brazil
- Branch: Brazilian Expeditionary Force
- Conflicts: World War II
- Musical career
- Instrument: Berimbau · pandeiro · mouth berimbau · xylophone

Pedro Mello dos Santos (October 2, 1919 — February 23, 1993), also known as Pedro Sorongo and Pedro da Lua, was a Brazilian musician, percussionist, and visual artist. He was a virtuoso percussionist, composer, and inventor of percussion instruments such as the electronic bamboo and the mouth berimbau. He performed with renowned artists like Jacob do Bandolim, Baden Powell, Elis Regina, Elza Soares, Sebastião Tapajós, Roberto Ribeiro, Milton Nascimento, Clara Nunes, among others.

== Biography ==
Pedro Mello dos Santos was born on October 2, 1919 in the neighborhood of São Cristóvão, in Rio de Janeiro. After serving with the Brazilian Expeditionary Force in the Italian Campaign and returning from World War II at the end of 1945, he decided to dedicate himself to music. While working as a doorman for Rádio Tupi, he met important figures in the music scene of the time, to whom he would showcase his percussion rhythms as well as his compositions. During the 1950s, he saw his first songs recorded by artists such as Mário Mascarenhas, Orlando Silva, and Michel Daud. Shortly afterward, he was already performing with idols like Jacob do Bandolim, Altamiro Carrilho, and groups such as the Orquestra Tabajara. By the early 1960s, Sorongo was not only a musician recognized for his creativity but also created a rhythm that became his stage name, the sorongo.

The creator of instruments such as the berimboca (the mouth berimbau) and the tamba (a bamboo drum kit created with Hélcio Milito, which gave the Tamba Trio its name), Pedro Santos was not only a percussionist who performed with many major figures in MPB but also a composer and instrument inventor. While Pedro always had his compositions recorded and released by other artists, the exception was his only self-authored work, the album Krishnanda, released in 1968.

Despite his significant contribution to Brazilian music, his album Krishnanda remained obscure until the mid-2000s, when it began to circulate on bootlegs in Europe and as MP3s on the internet. Krishnanda is increasingly regarded as a precursor of afrobeat and a lost masterpiece of Brazilian music, much like the work of Di Melo.
