= Adoro (Plácido Domingo album) =

Studio album by Plácido Domingo
- Released: 1982
- Label: CBS
- Producer: Antonio Fernandez

Adoro is a 1982 album of popular Mexican songs by Plácido Domingo.

== Track listing ==
1. "Adoro" - Armando Manzanero
2. "Un viejo amor" - Adolfo Fernández / Alfonso Esparza Oteo
3. "Serenata tapatia" - Ernesto Cortázar / Manuel Esperón
4. "Adios mariquita Linda" - Marcos A. Jiménez
5. "La negra noche"
6. "Las mañanitas a la Virgen"
7. "El triste" - Roberto Cantoral
8. "Rayando el sol"
9. "Noche plateada" - Pedro Infante
10. "China"
11. "Maria bonita" - Agustin Lara
