= Somos todos iguais nesta noite =

Studio album by Ivan Lins
- Released: May 1977
- Genres: MPB; baroque pop
- Length: 35:20
- Label: Odeon
- Producers: Mariozinho Rocha; Eduardo Souto Neto; Milton Miranda

Somos todos iguais nesta noite (English: "We are all equal tonight") is the sixth studio album by Brazilian musician Ivan Lins, released in May 1977 by Odeon Records.

== Production ==
Somos todos iguais nesta noite is one of several of Lins' albums to incorporate the talents of his long-time songwriting partner, Vitor Martins. This professional partnership would endure between the two musicians until the mid-1990s.

== Artwork ==
The album's artwork was created by Mello Menezes. It depicts a stylized Lins as a magician pulling a pineapple out of a hat, with trapeze artists and a lion in a circus tent alongside him.

== Legacy ==
The album's title track was highlighted in a 1977 article in Veja magazine for its political themes critical of the military dictatorship in Brazil; it would become one of Lins' best-known songs.

Multiple tracks on Somos todos iguais nesta noite have been covered or sampled by other artists. The track "Dona Palmeira" was covered by the American jazz flautist Herbie Mann in 1978, with its first appearance on his album Sunbelt. A Grammy-winning instrumental cover of "Dinorah, Dinorah" appears on the American jazz guitarist George Benson's 1980 album Give Me the Night, produced by Quincy Jones. Japanese music producer and DJ Nujabes sampled "Qualquer dia" on his single "Luv(sic) Part 2" in 2002, and "Choro das águas" on his 2013 posthumous release "Luv(sic) Grand Finale".

In 2022, Somos todos iguais nesta noite was ranked no. 233 in Discoteca Básica's list of the 500 greatest Brazilian music records.

== Track listing ==
All tracks are written by Ivan Lins and Vitor Martins with additional writers listed.

No.	Title	Writer(s)	Length
1.	"Quadras de roda"		3:35
2.	"Um fado"		2:10
3.	"Dinorah, Dinorah"		3:13
4.	"Aparecida"	Maurício Tapajós	4:20
5.	"Velho sermão"	Ronaldo Monteiro de Souza	3:08
6.	"Choro das águas"		2:38
7.	"Somos todos iguais nesta noite (É o circo de novo)"		3:05
8.	"Mãos de afeto"		5:23
9.	"Dona Palmeira"		2:50
10.	"Ituverava"		3:05
11.	"Qualquer dia"		1:45
Total length:			35:20

== Personnel ==
The album's liner notes attribute credits to:

- Ivan Lins — acoustic guitar, piano, vocals, second tenor vocals, countertenor vocals, arrangements
- Lucinha Lins (credited as Lucinha) — percussion, vocals, countertenor vocals, chorus
- Gilson Peranzzetta — piano, electric piano, organ, accordion, synthesizer, arrangements, conductor
- João Cortez — drums, bongos, percussion
- Fred Barbosa — electric bass
- Robertinho Silva (credited as Robertinho) — percussion
- Jorge Ferreira Da Silva (credited as Jorginho) — flute
- Sivuca — accordion
- Everaldo Ferreira (credited as Everaldo) — percussion
- Maurício Einhorn — harmonica
- Ricardo Pontes — flute
- Chico Moreira — Portuguese guitar
- Jaime Araujo — clarinet
- Marko Rupe — clarinet
- Netinho — clarinet
- Abel Ferreira — clarinet
- José Menezes — mandolin
- Tavito — vocal arrangements, viola
- Braz Limonge — oboe
- Zdenek Svab (credited as Swab) — trumpet
- Biju — bass clarinet
- Tavynho Bonfá (credited as Octávio Burnier) — viola, phaser
- Celso Woltzenlogel — flute
- Nicolino Copia (credited as Copinha) — flute
- Flavinho, Zé Luis, Márcio Lott, Mauro, Márcio Proença, Regininha, Soninha — chorus

=== Production credits ===
- Mello Menezes — album art, graphics, photography
- Mariozinho Rocha — director, producer
- Eduardo Souto Neto — executive producer, arrangements, conductor
- Milton Miranda — producer
- Osmar Furtado — mastering engineer
- Roberto Castro — recording engineer
- Nivaldo Duarte — mixing engineer
