= Late Again (musician) =

Brazilian-American pop musician

- Born: Rafael Melo
- Origin: Brooklyn, New York, U.S.
- Genres: Indie pop; Dream pop
- Occupations: Musician; Singer-songwriter
- Years active: 2024–present
- Website: imlateagain.com

Late Again is the musical project of Brazilian musician Rafael Melo. Based in Brooklyn, New York, Late Again blends dream pop with cinematic textures shaped by influences ranging from Brazilian tropicália to indie rock.

== Biography ==
Melo was born and raised in Brazil, and moved to the United States in his mid-twenties, settling in Brooklyn, New York. He made his musical debut in April 2024 with his first single "Flood".

His debut EP Migraine Fever Dream was released in May 2024, featuring a collaboration with Brazilian composer and arranger Arthur Verocai. Later in 2024, he released his second EP Absolutely Almost Sure, described as "blurring the boundaries between pop and alternative" by Billboard Argentina.

In 2025, Late Again released Clearly It's All Staged and toured North America for the first time. JazzTimes described the EP as drawing on Brazilian jazz textures brought into an indie pop setting, and Notion Magazine called it a portrait of belonging and displacement.

His fourth EP, I Dreamt I Was Awake, was released in September 2026.

== Discography ==
=== EPs ===
- Migraine Fever Dream (2024)
- Absolutely Almost Sure (2024)
- Clearly It's All Staged (2025)
- I Dreamt I Was Awake (2026)
