= Perla (singer) =

Paraguayan-Brazilian singer

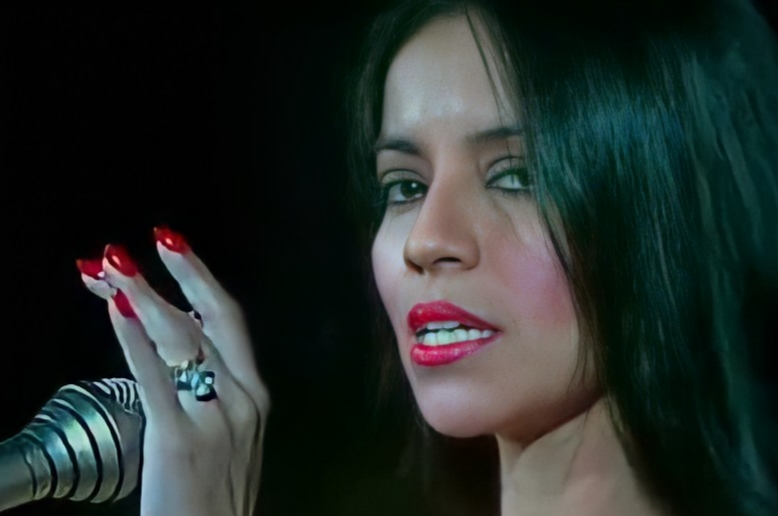
- Perla in 1984

Background information
- Born: Ermelinda Pedroso Rodríguez D'Almeida; 17 March 1952 (age 74); Caacupé, Cordillera, Paraguay
- Genres: Guarania; Bolero
- Occupation: Singer
- Instrument: Vocals
- Years active: 1970–present

Ermelinda Pedroso Rodríguez D'Almeida (born 17 March 1952), known professionally as Perla and also as Perla Paraguaia, is a Paraguayan-born Brazilian singer and songwriter.

She became nationally known in Brazil in the 1970s for a romantic repertoire that included guarania, bolero and Portuguese-language versions of international pop songs. Her 1976 recording of a Portuguese version of ABBA's "Fernando", released on the album Palavras de Amor, became one of her best-known recordings. Brazilian and Paraguayan media have credited Perla with sales of more than ten million records and multiple gold and platinum records during her career.

== Biography ==
Perla was born in Caacupé, Paraguay, into a family of musicians. Before beginning her solo career, she performed with her father and siblings in the family group Las Maravillas del Paraguay. She moved to Brazil in the early 1970s and later settled in Santos. This is where she began performing in nightclubs as "O Bigode do Meu Tio" (The Mustache of My Uncle).

== Career ==
In the mid-1970s, Perla developed a repertoire ranging from guaranias and boleros to Portuguese-language versions of foreign pop songs. In 1976, she gained national recognition in Brazil with her version of "Fernando", which was included on the RCA album Palavras de Amor. During her career, she has sold more than 10 million records and won 10 Gold Records, 2 Platinum and a Double Platinum, among other awards. Through her career she has recorded songs in Spanish, Portuguese, English, and Italian.

In 1979, she released an album featuring disco-influenced arrangements, including a version of "Love Is in the Air". She remained active during the 1980s and 1990s through live performances, television appearances and recordings. "Pequenina", her version of ABBA's "Chiquitita", also became associated with her repertoire.

Her greatest success she obtained with the music theme "Comienza amanecer" (start of dawn), which describes the situation that many women go through their husband's infidelity. This song dates from 1981.

PPerla appeared at the Viña del Mar International Song Festival and served as a juror at its 1984 edition. "Fernando", "Pequenina" and "Comienza a amanecer" have been cited among the songs most closely associated with her career.

She released Especialmente para você in 1999. In 2002, Perla canta ABBA e outros hits, a compilation prepared by music researcher Rodrigo Faour, revisited her recordings of ABBA songs and other international hits.

In 2024, Perla joined Brazilian singer Ana Castela on a recording of "Mercedita" for Castela's project Herança Boiadeira, Vol. 1.

Pearl married a Brazilian, who was her employer and has an adopted daughter named Perlinha, who has attempted her own singing career. Perla also currently has a granddaughter.

Perla has suffered economic problems in her older age. While she lives in a house that she bought with the money she earned, her house is in a state of abandonment, a fact which was demonstrated on an episode of a Paraguayan television show named "Domingo Show" that was dedicated to her.

== Honours ==
In June 2018, the Chamber of Deputies of Paraguay awarded Perla the Orden Nacional al Mérito Comuneros in recognition of her career as a singer and her international prominence.

In November 2025, the Chamber of Deputies presented her with the Premio Emiliano R. Fernández in recognition of her contribution to Paraguayan culture and her career.

== Selected discography ==
- Perla (1975, RCA)
- Palavras de Amor (1976, RCA)
- Perla (1979, RCA)
- Especialmente para você (1999)
- Perla canta ABBA e outros hits (2002)
