= Um Banda Um =

Studio album by Gilberto Gil
- Released: 1982
- Recorded: June–July 1982
- Studio: Rio de Janeiro, Brazil
- Genre: MPB, pop, rock, reggae
- Label: WEA
- Producer: Liminha

Gilberto Gil chronology
'Luar (A Gente Precisa Ver o Luar)' (1981)	Um Banda Um (1982)	'Extra' (1983)

Um Banda Um is a studio album by Brazilian musician Gilberto Gil, released in 1982.

Initially intended for the international market, Gil had recorded some reggae-influenced material in New York. However, upon reviewing the material in Brazil, he was dissatisfied with the results and postponed the project. The album was ultimately recorded in Rio de Janeiro city between June and July 1982, with production handled by Liminha — who also produced Gil's previous album, Luar—and released by Warner.

Despite the American rhythmic influence, at the time of its release Gil described the record as a search for “a universalist sense of Umbanda as a split from the closed cult of religions, whether Candomblé or Catholicism, both monist, each with its own truth; the necessary pantheism of Umbanda, a religion that is not one but ‘all’, mixing Kardecism, Catholicism. ... African polytheism (and Banda Um is a music-synthesis with a panculturalist intention and concept, a song that cultivates the ideas of music, youth, behavior, consumption and various nationalisms).”

The album includes some of Gil's most iconic songs, such as "Drão", "Andar com Fé", and "Esotérico", all of which are heavily influenced by reggae.

== Track listing ==
All tracks are written by All tracks written by Gilberto Gil, except where noted.

No.	Title	Writer(s)	Length
1.	"Banda Um"		4:40
2.	"Afoxé É"		4:05
3.	"Metáfora"		4:20
4.	"Deixar Você"		4:45
5.	"Pula, Caminha"	Marino Pinto, Manezinho Araujo	3:40
6.	"Andar Com Fé"		3:20
7.	"Drão"		3:20
8.	"Esotérico"		4:22
9.	"Menina do Sonho"		4:55
10.	"Ê Menina"	João Donato, Guttemberg Guarabyra	3:50
11.	"Nossa"		2:45
12.	"Afoxé É (first version)" (Bonus track)		4:02
13.	"Deixar Você (first version)" (Bonus track)		4:46
14.	"Esotérico (first version)" (Bonus track)		3:57
15.	"Banda Um (first version)" (Bonus track)		4:30
16.	"Ê Menina (first version)" (Bonus track)		5:28
17.	"Esotérico (re-recording take 01)" (Bonus track)		4:28

== Reception ==
Tárik de Souza, for newspaper Jornal do Brasil, wrote that in Um Banda Um, “Gil dominated the indominable” and added that “poetically, Gil has never been so agile”. Renato Sérgio, for a magazine Manchete, realized that part of the public “was finding the africanist aspects of Gil's career excessive, especially in Um Banda Um."

== Legacy ==
According to journalist and music researcher Ceci Alves, for Google Arts & Culture, in Um Banda Um, Gil reveals his relationship with Umbanda, a religion that, for him, was a kind of antechamber to the Candomblé rites.

Lucas Teixeira, for the cultural portal MonkeyBuzz, writes that “Um Banda Um is a lively celebration by the Bahian of what life has to offer. There's the divine, the mysterious, faith, the various possibilities of love. It's an album by a Gil who isn't afraid to be happy or to show the world that happiness.”

In an election promoted by the podcast Discoteca Básica, which listened to 162 experts and listed the 500 greatest albums in the history of Brazilian music, Um Banda Um was ranked 490th out of the 17 Gil albums on the list.

== See also ==
- AllMusic rated the album. Review on AllMusic
