= Mateus Aleluia =

Brazilian musician and ethnomusicologist (born 1943)

Mateus Aleluia Lima
- Born: September 25, 1943 (age 83); Cachoeira, Bahia, Brazil

Mateus Aleluia Lima (b. 1943) is a Brazilian singer-songwriter and ethnomusicologist.

== Biography ==
Mateus Aleluia was born in Cachoeira on September 25, 1943.

Mateus joined the band Os Tincoãs in 1960 along with other members Heraldo and Dadinho. Heraldo later left the band and was replaced by Badú.

In 1983, Os Tincoãs visited Angola with Martinho da Vila at the invitation of the MPLA. Mateus and Dadinho decided to stay in Angola, but Badú returned to Brazil, thus breaking up the band. Mateus was hired by Angola's State Secretariat for Culture to develop a cultural research project on Pan-African musical heritage, and traveled the country to meet masters of various types of traditional music. Living in Angola for almost 20 years, Mateus also worked as an art teacher. He returned to Brazil in 2002.
