= Vitor Ramil =

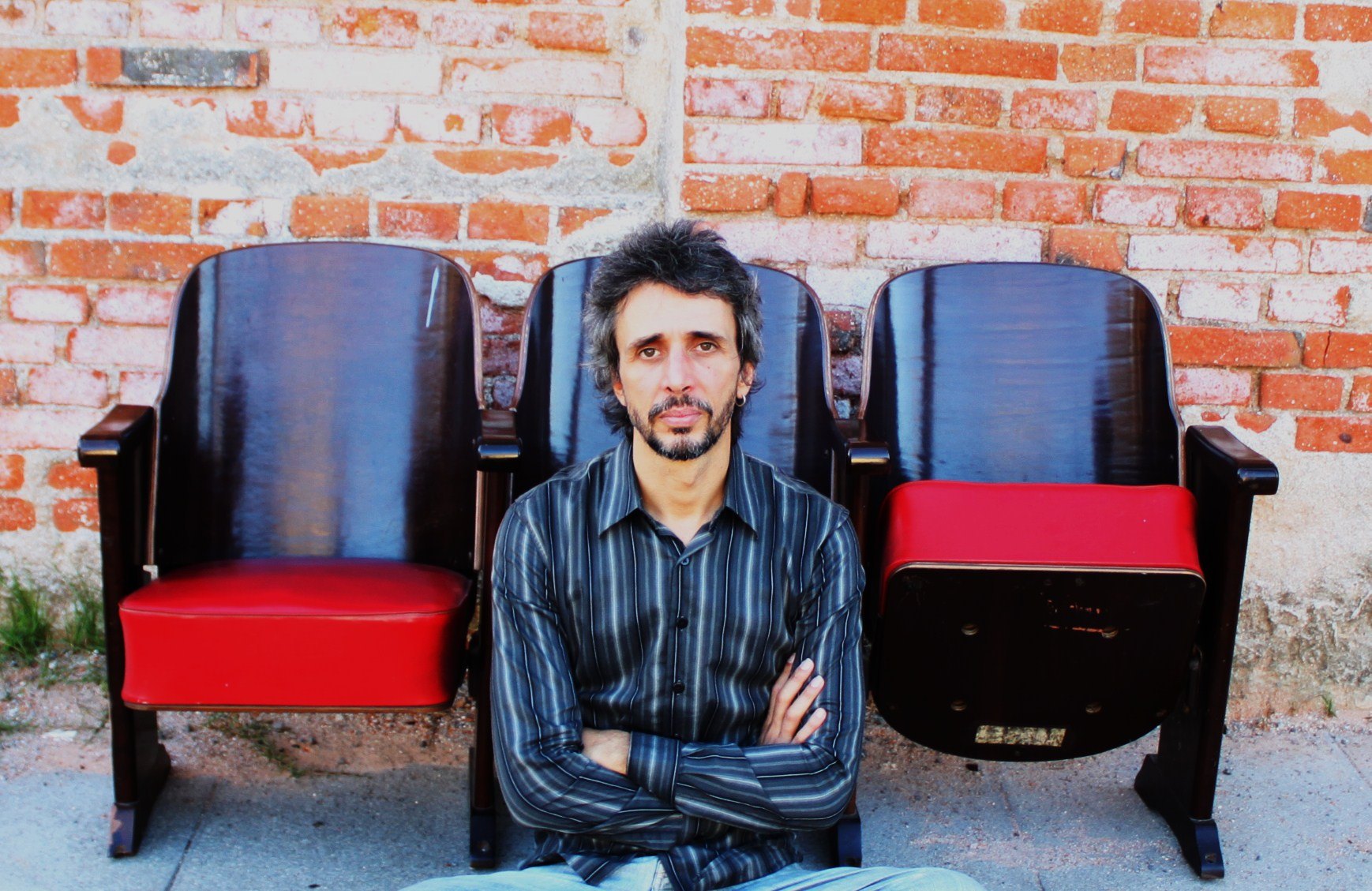
Vitor Ramil

Vitor Ramil (born April 7, 1962, Pelotas, Rio Grande do Sul) is a musician, singer, composer and writer from Brazil.

== Discography ==
- Estrela, Estrela (1981)
- A Paixão de V Segundo Ele Próprio (1984)
- Tango (1987) – re-edited in CD on 1996
- À Beça (1996)
- Ramilonga – A Estética do Frio (1997)
- Tambong (1998)
- Longes (2004)
- Satolep Sambatown (2007) with Marcos Suzano
- Délibáb (2010)
- Foi no Mês que Vem (2013)
- Campos Neutrais (2017)
- Avenida Angélica (2022) (CD e DVD)
- Mantra Concreto (2024)

== Writing works ==
- Pequod (1999) – available in electronic format (in Portuguese)
- A Estética do Frio (2004)
- Satolep (2010)

== Satolep ==
"Satolep" is an anagram for Pelotas, city where the artist was born. In his book "A Estetica do Frio", the author mentions that Satolep is his idealization of his hometown. He uses the word in several songs and writing works.
