= Plebe Rude =

Brazilian musical group

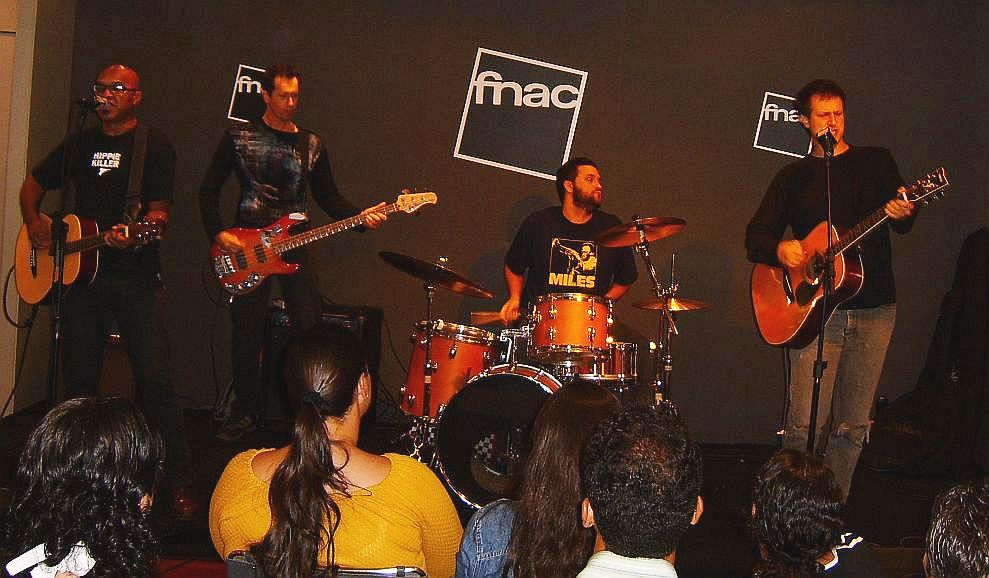
- Plebe Rude in 2006

Background information
- Origin: Brasília, DF, Brazil
- Genres: Punk rock, post-punk, new wave, alternative rock
- Years active: 1981-1994 1999–present
- Labels: EMI, Sony Music, Coqueiro Verde, Substancial Music
- Members: Philippe Seabra; Clemente Nascimento; André X; Marcelo Capucci
- Past members: Jander Bilaphra; Gutje Woortmann; Rodrigo Txotxa
- Website: pleberude.com.br

Plebe Rude is a Brazilian punk rock band formed in Brasília.

== History ==
The band was formed in July 7 1981 by Gutje Woorthmann, André "X" Mueller and Jander "Ameba" Bilaphra, when Phillipe, André and Gutje wrote the song "Pressão Social". The four members had different tastes within the punk genre, but they were united by their admiration for The Clash, in fact they even did a cover under the name "Clash City Rockers".

The band was part of Turma da Colina, with members of other bands from Brasília, like Aborto Elétrico, Blitx 64, Metralhas and others.

Legião Urbana and Plebe Rude performed at a rock festival in Patos de Minas on September 5, 1982, the first concert by the newly formed Legião Urbana, opening for Plebe Rude. After their performances, they were arrested because of their lyrics, Plebe Rude because of the song called "Voto em Branco" and Legião Urbana because of the song "Música Urbana 2", but they were all released.

The band was officially separated in 1994, when Seabra moved to New York City, where he formed Daybreak Gentlemen.

In 1999, the band reunited to perform at the Porão do Rock 99 festival in Brasília.

On July 7, 2021, the date of his 40th birthday, he released the single “68” from the album Evolução - Vol. II.

In March 2023, the album Evolução - Volume II was released, which features 28 songs about human evolution.

== Discography ==
=== Studio albums ===
- 1986 - O Concreto Já Rachou (EMI)
- 1987 - Nunca Fomos Tão Brasileiros (EMI)
- 1988 - Plebe Rude (EMI)
- 1993 - Mais Raiva Do Que Medo (Natasha Records)
- 2006 - R ao Contrário (L&C Editora)
- 2014 - Nação Daltônica (Substancial Music)
- 2019 - Evolução - Vol. I (Independent )
- 2023 - Evolução - Vol. II (Independent )

=== Live/video albums ===
- 2000 - Enquanto a Trégua Não Vem (EMI)
- 2011 - Rachando Concreto: Ao Vivo em Brasília (Coqueiro Verde)
- 2018 - Primórdios 1981 - 1983 (Ao Vivo) (ShowLivre)

=== Compilation albums ===
- 1997 - Portfólio (EMI) - box
- 1998 - Preferência Nacional (EMI)
- 2001 - Para Sempre (EMI)
- 2002 - Identidade (EMI)
- 2003 - 2 em 1 (O Concreto Já Rachou e Nunca Fomos Tão Brasileiros juntos em um único CD) (EMI)
- 2012 - Brasília (EMI)

== Bibliography ==
- Marchetti, Paulo (2001). O Diário da Turma 1976-1986: A História do Rock de Brasília (in Portuguese). Conrad. ISBN 9788587193377.
