= Previsão do Tempo =

Studio album by Marcos Valle
- Released: 1973
- Recorded: 1973
- Studio: Odeon Studios, Rio de Janeiro
- Genre: MPB; funk; samba; jazz
- Length: 36:49
- Language: Portuguese
- Label: Odeon; EMI; Light in the Attic; Polysom

Marcos Valle chronology
| Vento Sul (1972) | Previsão do Tempo (1973) | Marcos Valle (1974) |

Previsão do Tempo (transl. Weather Forecast) is a studio album by Brazilian singer-songwriter Marcos Valle. It was released in 1973 on Odeon and EMI Records. The album features Brazilian jazz-funk trio Azymuth as Valle's backing band.

== Recording and release ==
Marcos Valle recorded Previsão do Tempo at Odeon Studios in Rio de Janeiro in 1973. Many songs on the album contain veiled political commentary, inspired by the ongoing military rule and government censorship of Emílio Garrastazu Médici's regime in Brazil. The album's cover artwork, depicting a bearded Valle underwater, represents the "shortness of breath" of Brazilians under the regime.

The album's track "Os Ossos do Barão" was the theme song of the Brazilian telenovela of the same name, and the track "Mentira" also gained popularity after being featured on the Brazilian telenovela Carinhoso.

In 2013, Previsão do Tempo was reissued in the United States on Light in the Attic. In 2018, the album was again reissued on Polysom, a division of Mr Bongo Records.

== Critical reception ==
Professional ratings
Review scores
| Source | Rating |
|---|---|
| AllMusic | 5/5 stars |
| Rolling Stone | 3.5/4 stars |

Previsão do Tempo received positive reviews from music critics. In a five-star review for AllMusic, John Bush called the album a "masterpiece" consisting of "loose, aqueous, funk-filled jams with synth and electric bass leading the way." Music critic Will Hermes of Rolling Stone called the album a "pop-rock-samba-jazz gem", noting its "wicked rhythmic sense" and "politically coded poetry" and comparing the track "Mentira" to Stevie Wonder's "Superstition". In another positive review for The Austin Chronicle, reviewer Thomas Fawcett wrote, "Previsão oozes sticky synth-laden grooves, none better than the hazy sing-song funk of 'Mentira.'" Ernest Barteldes of Newcity praised Valle's instrumental innovation, writing, "the combination of his Fender Rhodes and José Roberto Bertrami’s Hammond is nothing short of genius."

== Track listing ==
All tracks were written by Marcos Valle and Paulo Sérgio Valle, except where otherwise indicated.

| No. | Title | Writer(s) | Length |
|---|---|---|---|
| 1. | "Flamengo Até Morrer" (Flamengo Until I Die) | | 3:31 |
| 2. | "Nem Paletó, Nem Gravata" (No Jacket, No Tie) | | 3:04 |
| 3. | "Tira a Mão" (Hands Off) | | 2:52 |
| 4. | "Mentira" (Lie) | | 3:43 |
| 5. | "Previsão do Tempo" (Weather Forecast) | Marcos Valle | 3:41 |
| 6. | "Mais do Que Valsa" (More Than a Waltz) | | 2:56 |
| 7. | "Os Ossos do Barão" (The Baron's Bones) | | 2:22 |
| 8. | "Não Tem Nada Não" (It's Nothing) | Eumir Deodato; João Donato; Marcos Valle | 3:15 |
| 9. | "Não Tem Nada Não (II)" | Eumir Deodato; João Donato; Marcos Valle | 1:29 |
| 10. | "Samba Fatal" | | 3:10 |
| 11. | "Tiu-Ba-La-Quiéba" | | 3:31 |
| 12. | "De Repente, Moça Flor" (Suddenly, Flower Girl) | | 3:15 |
| Total length: | | | 36:49 |

== Personnel ==
Adapted from AllMusic and O Globo.

- Marcos Valle – vocals, Rhodes piano, guitar
- José Roberto Bertrami – Hammond organ, Minimoog, ARP synthesizer
- Alex Malheiros – bass, guitar
- Cezar de Mercês – bass
- Sergio Hinds – guitar
- Ivan Conti – drums, percussion
- Vinicius Cantuária – drums
- Paulo Sérgio Valle – composer, production assistant
