= Arthur Verocai (album) =

Studio album by Arthur Verocai
- Released: 1972
- Recorded: 1972; Rio de Janeiro, Brazil
- Genres: Psychedelic rock, folk jazz, Latin jazz, funk, MPB
- Length: 29:01
- Labels: Continental; SLP-10.079

Arthur Verocai chronology
Arthur Verocai (1972)	Saudade Demais (2002)

Arthur Verocai is the debut studio album by Brazilian composer Arthur Verocai, released by Continental Records in 1972.

== Background ==
At the time of release, Verocai had been producing albums for musicians such as Elis Regina, Jorge Ben, and Ivan Lins. Around the time of recording, Verocai often listened to American funk and soul musicians which heavily influenced the sound of the album; some of these artists included Frank Zappa, Miles Davis, Stan Kenton, and Wes Montgomery.

== Reception and legacy ==
Professional ratings
Review scores
Source	Rating
AllMusic	4.5/5 stars

The album was largely ignored by critics and sold very few copies upon its initial release in 1972. The low performance of the album motivated Verocai to rethink his career as a solo musician, deciding to pursue a music career in advertising.

Retrospective assessments of the album have been positive. Jason Ankeny of AllMusic awarded the album 4½ stars. Ankeny described the album as "fuse[ing] Brazilian tropicalia with American funk, yielding a shimmering, dreamlike mosaic of sound that both celebrates and advances the creative spirit." Hip-hop producer Madlib considers the album to be among his favorites stating, "I could listen to this album everyday for the rest of my life".

The album remained relatively unknown for three decades, but made a resurgence in the mid-2000s due to hip-hop acts sampling various songs from the album. Rapper and producer MF Doom sampled the song "Na Boca Do Sol" on the track "Orris Root Powder" in 2005. Hip-hop group Little Brother sampled Caboclo on the song "We Got Now" from their 2005 album The Minstrel Show.

Original copies of the LP have become highly sought after among fans and vinyl collectors since the album's resurgence. The Discogs marketplace reports a median selling price of $2,594.09 USD.

== Track listing ==
All tracks are written by Victor Martins and Arthur Verocai, except where noted.

No.	Title	Writer(s)	Length
1.	"Caboclo"		2:52
2.	"Pelas Sombras"		2:16
3.	"Sylvia"	Verocai	3:02
4.	"Presente Grego"		2:32
5.	"Dedicada A Ela"	Paulinho Tapajós, Verocai	3:33
6.	"Seriado"		1:45
7.	"Na Boca Do Sol"		2:54
8.	"Velho Parente"		2:20
9.	"O Mapa"		2:42
10.	"Karina (Domingo No Grajaú)"		5:16

== Personnel ==
Credits adapted from liner notes.

- Arthur Verocai – arranger, acoustic and electric guitar, producer, vocals (1)
- Aloísio Milanez – acoustic and electric piano
- Luiz Alves – bass
- Robertinho Silva – drums, percussion
- Pascoal Meirelles – drums
- Pedro Santos – percussion
- Oberdan Magalhães – alto sax, flute
- Paulo Moura – alto sax, soprano sax (9)
- Nivaldo Ornelas – tenor sax
- Paulinho Trompete – trumpet, vocals (1, 5, 7, 9)
- Hamilton Pereira da Cruz – trumpet
- Serginho Trombone – trombone
- Luiz Carlos Batera – vocals (1, 2, 5, 7, 9)
- José Carlos – vocals (1, 5, 7, 9)
- Luís Paulo Simas – synthesizer (1)
- Gilda Horta – vocals (4, 8)
- Toninho Horta – vocals (4, 8)
- Toninho Café – vocals (4, 8)
- Carlos Dafé – vocals (4, 8)
- Célia – vocals (6)
- Hélio Delmiro – electric guitar (10)
- Edson Maciel – trombone (10)
