= Luisa Micheletti =

Brazilian television personality

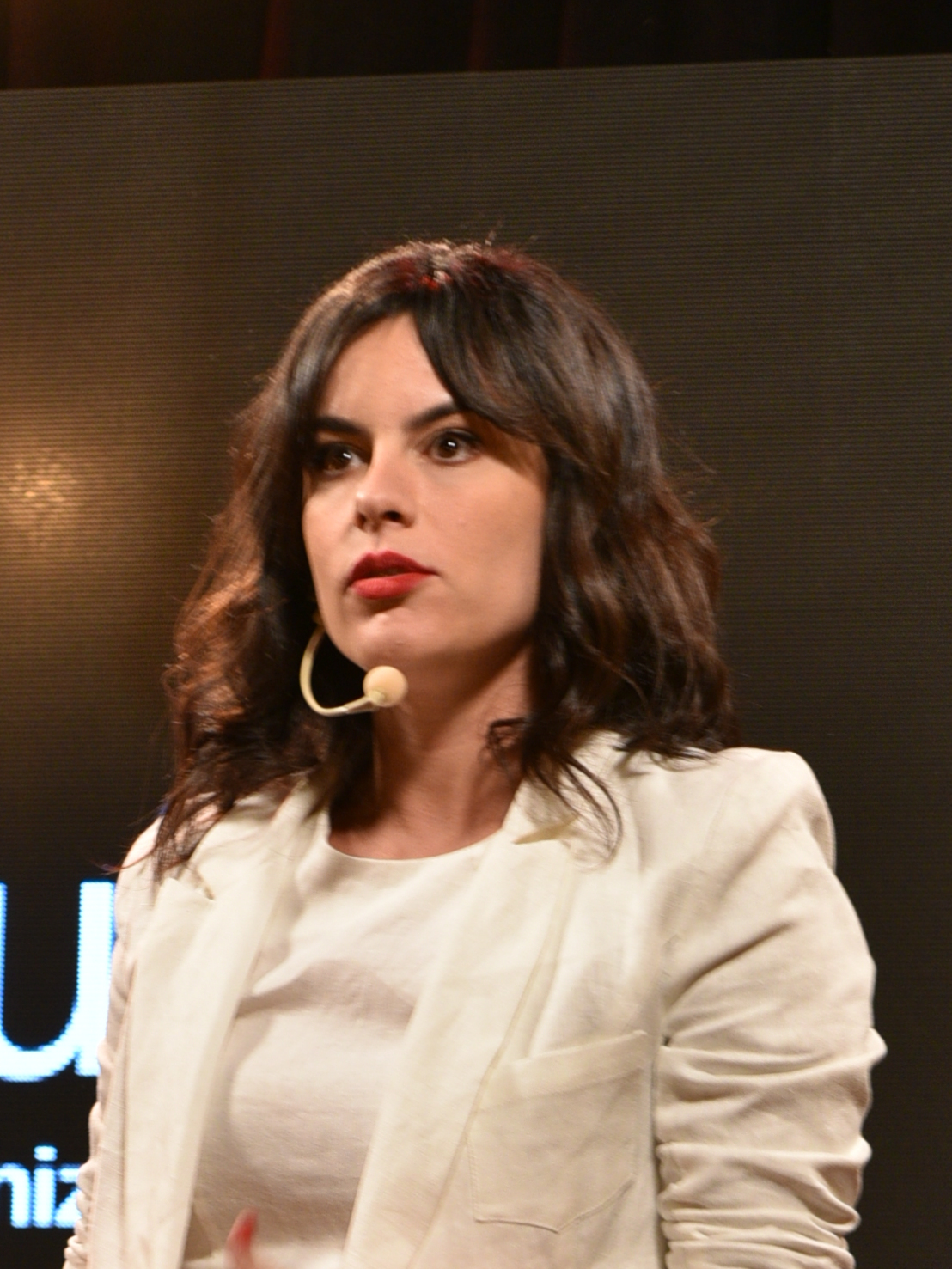
- Luisa Micheletti in September 2020
- Born: June 23, 1983 (age 41); São Paulo, SP, Brazil
- Occupation: Presenter

Luisa Micheletti (born June 23, 1983) is a presenter on MTV Brasil. She is from an Italian-Brazilian family. In the past she has also done other television presenting work.
