= Arthur Verocai =

Brazilian composer and musician (born 1945)

- Born: Arthur Cortes Verocai; June 17, 1945 (age 81); Rio de Janeiro, Brazil
- Genres: Bossa nova; soul; jazz; Latin jazz
- Occupations: Composer; guitarist; record producer
- Instruments: Guitar; piano; vocals
- Years active: 1969–present
- Labels: Continental; Far Out Recordings; WEA International

Arthur Côrtes Verocai (born June 17, 1945) is a Brazilian composer, singer, and producer. He is best known for his 1972 self-titled debut album which garnered a cult following during the 2000s in the United Kingdom and the United States.

== Career ==
Arthur Cortes Verocai was born in Rio de Janeiro on June 17, 1945. In school, he studied civil engineering. After graduating in 1968, he began arranging music under the mentorship of Roberto Menescal for artists like Jorge Ben, Gal Costa, Elis Regina, Ivan Lins, Marcos Valle, Quarteto em Cy, O Terço, Leny Andrade, and Célia.

In 1972, Verocai released his debut self-titled album which he describes as "samba mixed with soul." It contrasted with the music of Tim Maia, who pioneered the sound of Brazilian soul at the time. Verocai's influences for the album were anywhere from jazz musicians like Miles Davis, Bill Evans, and Wes Montgomery to classical artists like Debussy and Heitor Villa-Lobos to American funk and rock musicians like Chicago, Frank Zappa, and Jimmy Webb. Verocai has described himself as "a son of bossa," and was highly influenced by the bossa nova pieces of composers and singers like Tom Jobim and Leny Andrade which can be seen especially on tracks "Velho Parente" and "Que Mapa."

The album was largely ignored in Brazil when it was released which led Verocai to stop composing for 30 years and switch to arranging jingles for advertising instead. However, in the 2000s, the album started to achieve a cult-status, with some original vinyl copies selling for £2,000. In 2009, he performed his 1972 album with a 30-piece orchestra at California State University's Luckman Theater in Los Angeles.

After the resurgence of his 1972 album, Verocai got back to composing, releasing the album Encore in 2007, No Vôo do Urubu in 2016, and collaborations with acts such as BadBadNotGood, Hiatus Kaiyote, and Gal Costa.

He continues to perform live and is set to headline We Out Here Festival in the UK in August 2026.

== Influence ==
Verocai has been cited as an influence by TV on the Radio, Cut Chemist, MF Doom, Madlib, and BadBadNotGood.

His work was sampled by multiple artists such as Ludacris (Do The Right Thang, 2008), Curren$y (Can't Get Out, 2013), Action Bronson (The Spark, 2013) or Marcelo D2.

== Discography ==
=== Studio albums ===
List of studio albums, with selected details
Title	Details
Arthur Verocai	Released: 1972; Label: Continental
Saudade Demais	Released: 2002; Label: Independent release
Encore	Released: October 15, 2007; Label: Far Out Recordings
No Voo do Urubu	Released: 2016; Label: Selo SESC SP

=== Live albums ===
List of live albums, with selected details
Title	Details
Timeless	Released: March 30, 2010; Recorded: March 15, 2009; Label: Mochilla

=== As featured artist ===
- Hiatus Kaiyote – “Get Sun” from Mood Valiant (Australia, 2021); arranger
- Flor – "Sapiens" (Brazil, 2021)
- BadBadNotGood – Talk Memory (Canada, 2021); arranger
- Reina Kawamura (as Hiro Shinosawa from Gakuen Idolmaster) – "Koukei (光景)" (Japan, 2024); instrument arranger
- Late Again – "People Pleasers" from Migraine Fever Dream (United States, 2024); arranger
- Menahan Street Band – "Palace of Illusions" (United States, 2026); arranger
