= O Concreto Já Rachou =

Studio album by Plebe Rude
- Released: February 11, 1986
- Genre: Punk Rock
- Length: 21:32
- Label: EMI
- Producer: Herbert Vianna

Plebe Rude chronology
O Concreto Já Rachou (1986)	Nunca Fomos tão Brasileiros (1987)

O Concreto Já Rachou is the first album recorded by the Brazilian punk rock band Plebe Rude, released on February 11, 1986. A music video was made for the song "Até Quando Esperar".

== Track listing ==
No.	Title	Music	Length
1.	"Até Quando Esperar"	Philippe Seabra, André X, Gutje e Jander Bilaphra
2.	"Proteção"
3.	"Johnny Vai à Guerra (Outra Vez)"
4.	"Minha Renda"
5.	"Sexo e Karatê"	Philippe Seabra, André X, Gutje e Jander Bilaphra
6.	"Seu Jogo"	André X
7.	"Brasília"
Total length:			21:32

== Personnel ==
Plebe Rude

- Philippe Seabra: Vocals and guitar solo
- Jander Bilaphra: Vocals and guitar solo
- André X: Bass
- Gutje Woortman: Drum

Guest Musicians

- Fernanda Abreu: Vocals in "Sexo e Karatê"
- Jaques Morelenbaum: Cello in "Até Quando Esperar"
- Luiz Augusto: Trombone in "Seu Jogo"
- Herbert Vianna: Vocals in "Minha Renda"
- George Israel: Saxophone in "Seu Jogo"
- Henrique Trompete: Trumpet in "Seu Jogo"
