= Os Tincoãs =

Brazilian popular music band

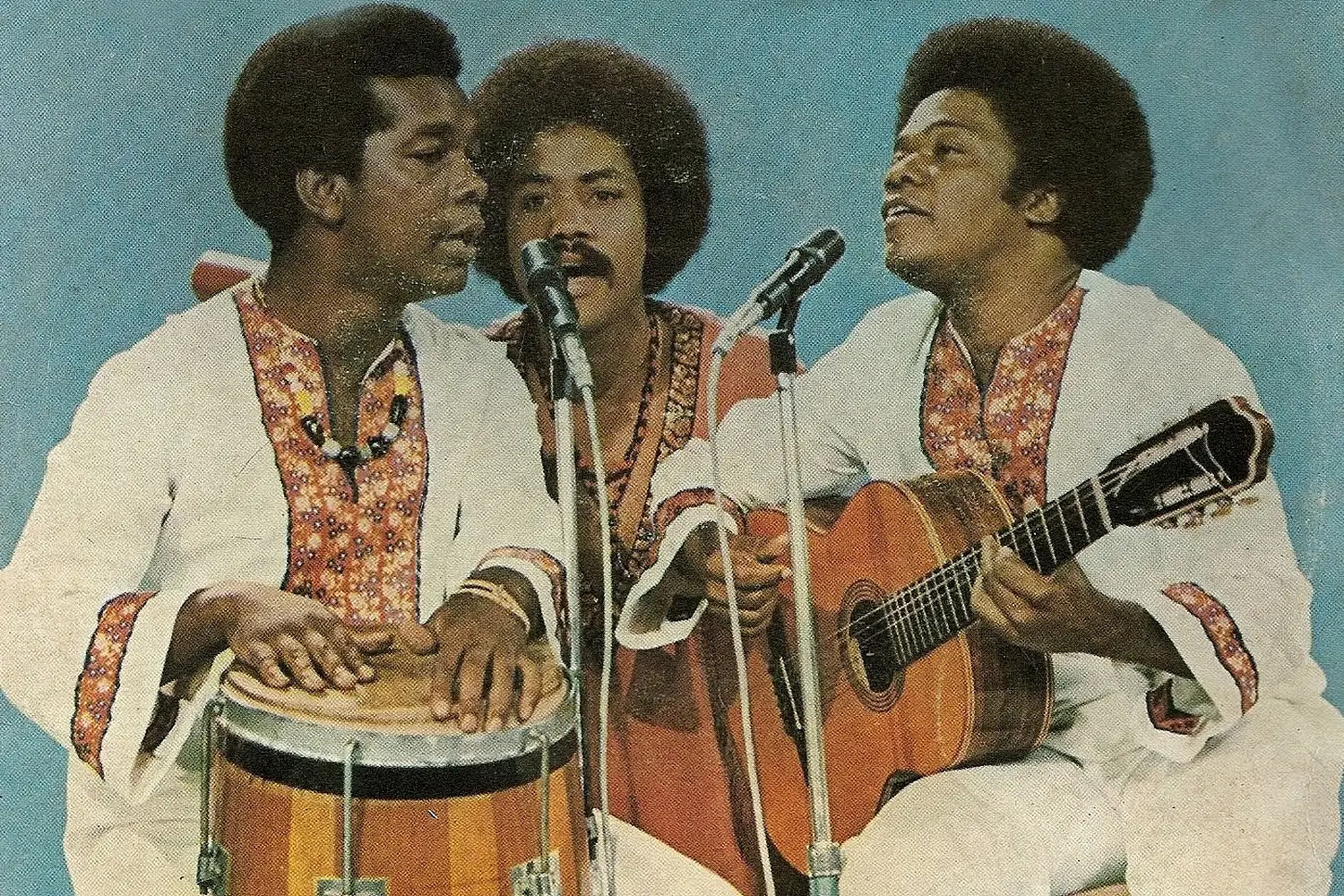
- Os Tincoãs in 1976. From left to right - Mateus Aleluia, Badú, Dadinho.

Background information
- Origin: Cachoeira, Bahia, Brazil
- Genres: MPB
- Years active: 1960–2000
- Past members: Mateus Aleluia, Heraldo, Dadinho and Badú.
- Website: tincoas.com.br

Os Tincoãs were a Brazilian popular music band from Bahia, primarily active in the 1960s and 1970s. They are named after the Tincoã bird, a subspecies of the Squirrel Cuckoo native to Brazil. The music of Os Tincoãs was heavily influenced by Bahia's Candomblé tradition.

Surviving member Mateus Aleluia is still very active in singing and songwriting. In 2017 he released "Fogueira Doce", a new album produced independently.

Badú is also a surviving member, who joined Os Tincoãs in 1975 remaining till 1983. He has been living on Gran Canaria for the last 30 years. Dadinho died in Luanda in 2000, where he had opened a bakery.

In 2023, an album of material recorded 40 years ago, “Canto Coral Afrobrasileiro,” was released. It received an honorable mention by the Associação Paulista de Críticos de Arte in their list of the 50 best Brazilian albums of 2023.

== Discography ==
- 1961 – Meu Último Bolero
- 1973 – Os Tincoãs
- 1975 – O Africanto dos Tincoãs
- 1977 – Os Tincoãs
- 1982 – Os Tincoãs Especial
- 1986 – Dadinho e Mateus
- 2017 – Nós, Os Tincoãs
- 2023 – Canto Coral Afrobrasileiro
