= Robson Jorge & Lincoln Olivetti =

Studio album by Robson Jorge and Lincoln Olivetti
- Released: 16 September 1982
- Genre: MPB; boogie; funk; soul; jazz
- Length: 38:55
- Label: Som Livre

Robson Jorge & Lincoln Olivetti is the sole collaborative album by Brazilian MPB musicians Robson Jorge and Lincoln Olivetti. It was released on 16 September 1982, on Som Livre.

== Background ==
Jorge and Olivetti were frequent collaborators, both prolific instrumentalists, arrangers, and producers who have worked with MPB musicians Tim Maia, Rita Lee, Roberto Carlos, Sandra de Sá, Marcos Valle, and Jorge Ben Jor. Robson Jorge & Lincoln Olivetti was Jorge and Olivetti's only studio album credited to the duo, but in 2021, an unreleased second collaborative album was rumored to exist. In 2023, a posthumous EP titled Déjà Vu was released on Selva Discos, containing five previously unreleased tracks by the duo.

== Legacy ==
Robson Jorge & Lincoln Olivetti has been hailed as a classic of MPB, defining the sound of the genre and influencing the likes of Tim Maia. The album became one of the rarest and most valuable vinyls in Brazil, coveted by record collectors. It is considered an international reference of MPB and has been played and remixed by DJs throughout the world.

Decades after its release, the album has been praised by music critics for its melodic hooks, bright and funky horn arrangements, scat vocals, and boogie grooves.

== Track listing ==
No.	Title	Length
1.	"Jorgea Corisco"	3:52
2.	"No Bom Sentido"	3:28
3.	"Aleluia"	3:54
4.	"Raton"	0:53
5.	"Pret-À-Porter"	3:30
6.	"Squash"	4:00
7.	"Eva"	5:44
8.	"Fá Sustenido"	3:03
9.	"Zé Piolho"	0:46
10.	"Pot-Pourri: Baila Comigo / Festa Brava"	3:29
11.	"Ginga"	3:01
12.	"Alegrias"	3:10
Total length:		38:55
