= Pablo Miyazawa =

Brazilian journalist

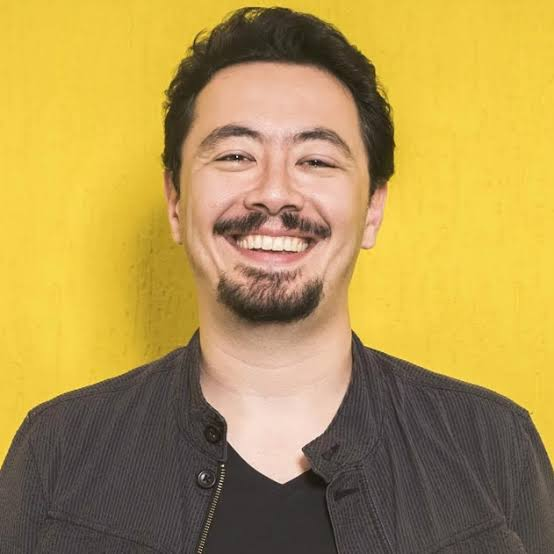
- Born: 02/26/1978; São Paulo
- Occupations: Journalist, Reporter and Writer

Pablo Miyazawa is a Brazilian journalist. He is the editor-in-chief of Rolling Stone Brasil since 2006 and, since 2015, of IGN Brasil, which he also helped to found. He has worked for magazines such as Nintendo World, EGM Brasil, Herói and Pokémon Club; at Conrad Editora, and he maintained his own website Gamer.br at IG between 2006 and 2011. He has published material at Folha de S.Paulo, Superinteressante, Set and MTV.

His career started as a Powerline in Gradiente Entertainment (Brazilian representative of Nintendo) - a "powerline" was a person who provided tips for videogames via telephone. In 2015, he founded the Brazilian IGN, focused on videogames.
