= Di Melo =

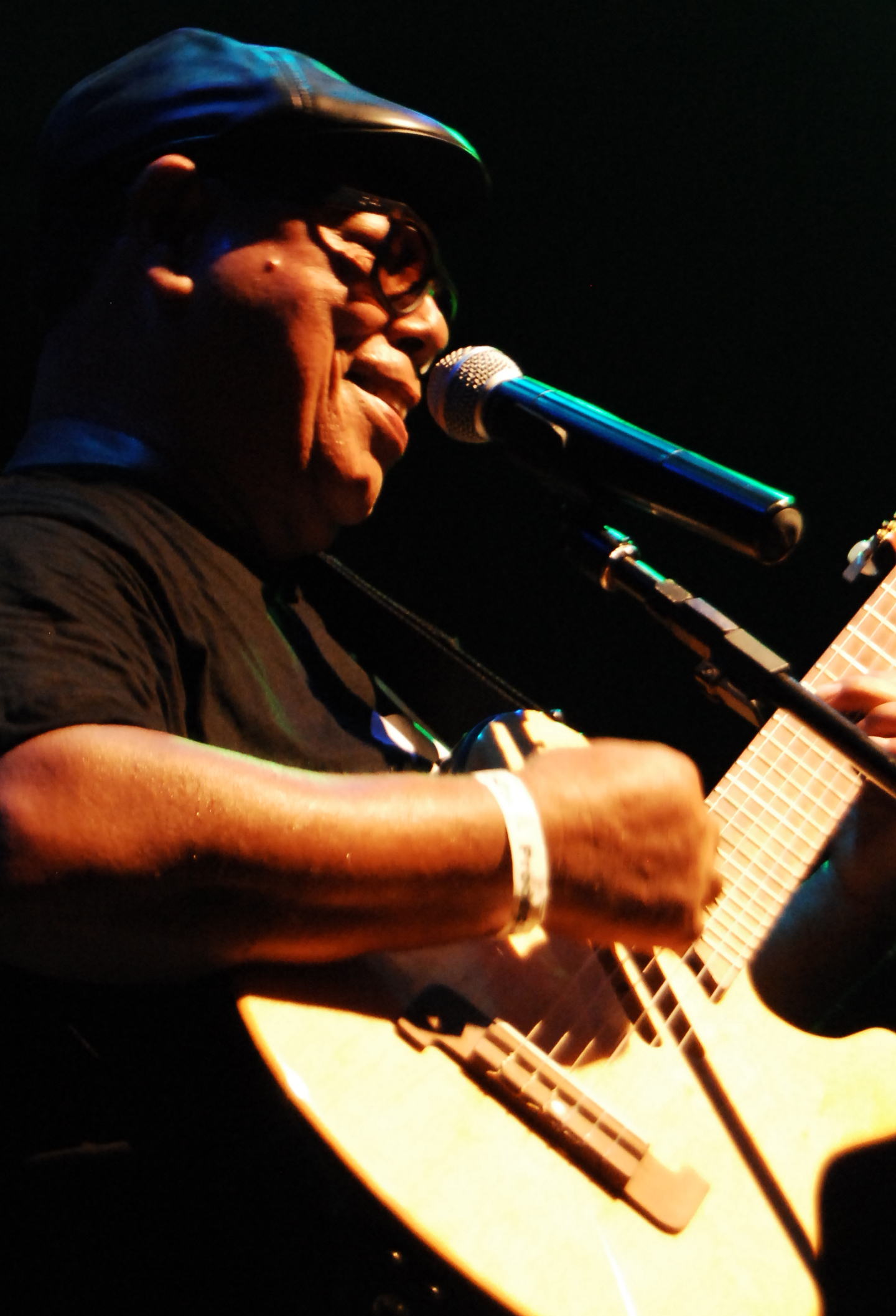
- Di Melo in 2006

Background information
- Born: Roberto de Melo Santos; April 22, 1949 (age 76); Recife, Pernambuco, Brazil
- Genres: MPB; funk; soul; psychedelia
- Occupations: Singer; songwriter
- Years active: 1965–present
- Website: imorriveldimelo.wixsite.com

Roberto de Melo Santos (born 22 April 1949), known professionally as Di Melo, is a Brazilian singer-songwriter. His albums are characterized by a variety of musical genres, frequently mixing soul and funk elements with psychedelia. He released his first album in 1975, at a time when several members of Brazilian black music started their careers.

After giving up public visibility, he went into ostracism, performing in bars and canteens. He started a songwriting partnership with Geraldo Vandré in the 1980s. At the beginning of the following decade, he suffered a serious motorcycle accident, which gave rise to rumors about Melo's supposed death. However, in 1997, one of his songs was included in the compilation Blue Brazil 2, making English DJs rediscover his work.

During the 2000s, he released several independent albums. He was later the subject of two documentaries and a fictional short film. Currently, he also works with paintings, sculptures and poems, having also written two books and acted in a play. In 2011, his first album had an appearance in The Black Eyed Peas' Don't Stop the Party music video.

In 2022, his first album was considered one of the 500 greatest albums in Brazilian music history, in a poll by podcast Discoteca Básica.

== Discography ==
Di Melo's catalogue consist of four official albums and eight independent albums.

=== Official albums ===
- Di Melo (1975)
- Distando Estava (1998)
- Imorrível (2016)
- Atemporal (with Cotonete) (2019)

=== Independent albums ===
- Sons, Sacações, Sambas e Tesões
- Seleção de Sambas
- Multicheiro
- Ah! É de Engravidar o Coração
- Coletânea
- Multicheiro 2
- 32 de Fevereiro
- Sambas, Armações e Tesões
