= Adolfo Fernández (pianist) =

Cuban pianist and journalist

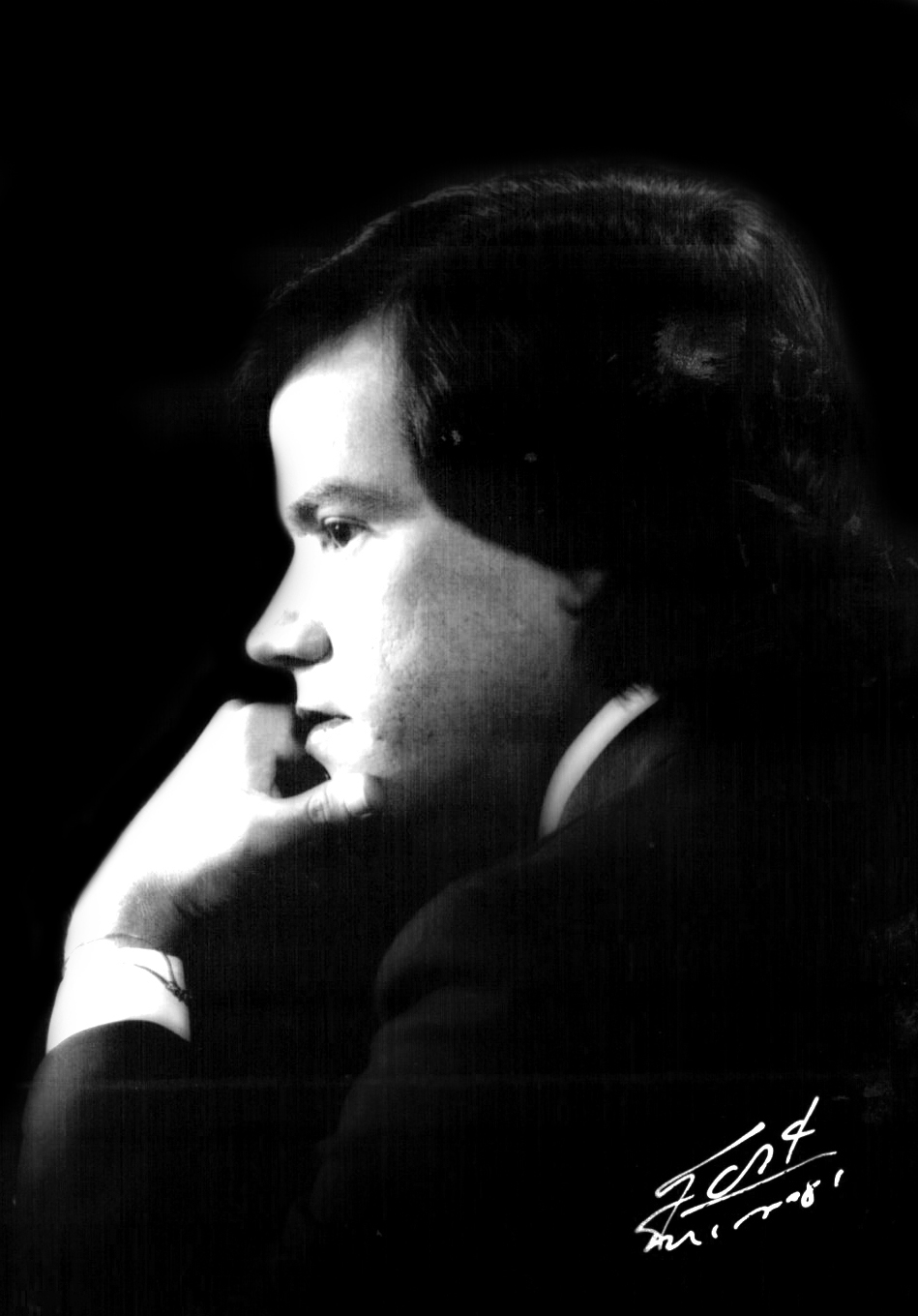

Background information
- Born: 21 May 1951 (age 74); Havana, Cuba
- Occupations: Concert pianist, journalist, advertiser
- Instrument: Piano

Adolfo Fernández (born 21 May 1951) is a Cuban pianist and journalist.

== Biography ==
Adolfo Fernández was born in Havana, Cuba. He studied music at the Carlos Alfredo Peyrellade and Amadeo Roldán Conservatory with the teachers Isabel Martí and Angela Quintana, respectively. Later, he continued his music studies at the National School of Art in Cuba under the leadership of the Mexican professor Ana Martinez. Fernandez continued with courses of composition, counterpoint, Contemporary Harmony, Morphology, Orchestration and Physical Acoustics at the Cuban Institute of Cinematographic Art and Industry (ICAIC), the Cuban composer Leo Brouwer, earned his first doctorate as a concert pianist and a second doctorate as musicologist, both at the University of Havana, he also took lessons with the eminent Australian pianist Roger Woodward, the Cuban pianist Luis González Rojas and the pianist and composer Harold Gramatges.

While living in Cuba, often he played as a soloist with the symphony orchestras of that country. He recorded three discs LPs with the signature EGREM. After his arrival in the United States, Fernandez became a finalist with honors in Lunchtime Lively Arts Series, sponsored by the Miami-Dade Community College; he was honored at the defunct Dupont Plaza Hotel in Miami for their contributions to the dissemination of Latin American and Cuban music, and later commissioned by the City of Miami, he edited a selection of musical works of Cuban master composers from the nineteenth century and recorded an album that mostly collected unpublished works written in Cuba in the 18th and 19th centuries. In 1981 he joined the class of the famous American pedagogue Adele Marcus and received master classes at the Juilliard School of Music in New York.

== Honors and awards ==
In 1981 he recorded for the firm Cuban reencounters his first full-length album in the United States entitled "Contradanzas, Danzas y Danzones" and this same year he was invited by the Organization of American States (OEA) to represent the City of Miami in a musical concert with works of 12 different composers from the American Continent. He travels as a soloist across the continent getting outstanding reviews from critics of major important newspapers.

In 1984 he founded and presides Adolfo's Institute of the Arts, a concept of artistic education that grouped four schools: dance, music, visual arts and drama. With over 300 students in template and a list of 25 teachers, there were plenty of talents that subsequently blunted as distinguished artists and teachers.

He has performed in Mexico, Brazil, Argentina, Guatemala, Panama, France, Italy, Germany, Puerto Rico, Venezuela, Colombia and Spain, among other countries.

Between 1988 and 1990, he worked as a music critic for the newspaper El Nuevo Herald.

In 1991 he was appointed editor of the weekly music seminar ¡Éxito! Sun Sentinel / Chicago Tribune in the city of Miami.

From 1994 to 2001 he directed the advertising department of WEA Latina, a subsidiary of Warner Music Group, Time Warner. There he worked directly with the careers leading figures of the music as Luis Miguel, Alejandro Sanz, Maná, Laura Pausini, Andrea Bocelli, Aventura, Enrique Iglesias, Franco De Vita, Shakira, Gloria Trevi and India.

== Present ==
From 2000 until now, he runs his own company, F & F Media Corp., based in Miami, specializing in artist management, organizing international events and global promotion of the most famous artists from the Latin American business.
