= Paulo Sérgio Valle =

Brazilian composer

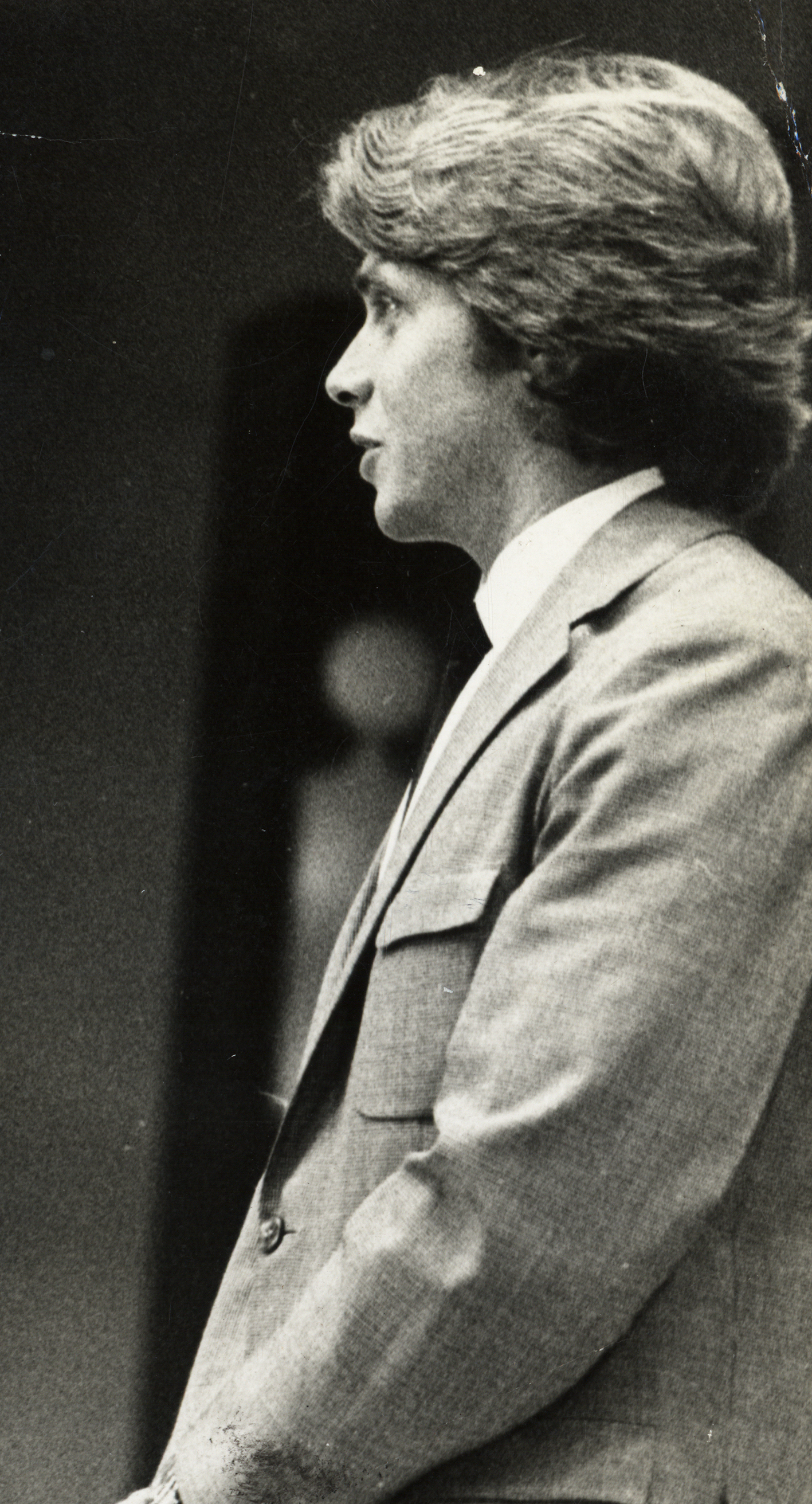

Background information
- Born: Paulo Sérgio Kostenbader Valle; August 6, 1940 (age 85); Rio de Janeiro, Brazil
- Occupations: composer, lyricist
- Years active: 1961-present
- Website: www.paulosergiovalle.com.br

Paulo Sérgio Kostenbader Valle (born August 6, 1940) is a Brazilian composer and lyricist.

== Career ==
Valle started his career as part of the bossa nova trend when, with his brother Marcos Valle, he composed "Samba de Verão", which became one of the three Brazilian songs to become global hits along with "The Girl from Ipanema" and "Aquarela do Brasil."

After this, Valle went on to write lyrics for various other composers, becoming one of the most important lyricists in a number of genres. He also became a successful jingle-writer as well.

Valle is also the lyricist, alongside Nelson Motta, to write the Christmas theme song for Rede Globo, with music by Marcos Valle and arrangements by Hugo Bellard. He also wrote the lyrics to the anthem of Goiás Esporte Clube. His music has been featured in In Time, Austin Powers: The Spy Who Shagged Me, Repo Men, and in the Brazilian telenovela Pigmalião 70. He won the IV Music Olympiad in Athens, Greece with his song "Minha Voz Virá do Sol da América."

== Personal life ==
Valle is the grandson of Eurico de Freitas Vale, ex-governor of Pará from 1929 to 1930.
