= Altamiro Carrilho =

- Birth name: Altamiro Aquino Carrilho
- Born: December 21, 1924; Santo Antônio de Pádua, Rio de Janeiro, Brazil
- Died: August 15, 2012 (aged 87); Rio de Janeiro, RJ, Brazil
- Genres: Choro
- Instrument: Western concert flute
- Years active: 1943 - 2012
- Website: www.altamirocarrilho.com.br/

Altamiro Carrilho (born Altamiro Aquino Carrilho; December 21, 1924 – August 15, 2012) was a Brazilian musician and composer. He is widely regarded as a master flutist and a major representative of the choro genre.

Carrilho died of lung cancer on August 15, 2012, in Rio de Janeiro.

== Discography ==
- Juntos (2002)
- Millenium (2000)
- Flauta Maravilhosa (1996)
- Brasil Musical - Série Música Viva - Altamiro Carrilho e Artur Moreira Lima (1996)
- Instrumental No CCBB- Altamiro Carrilho e Ulisses Rocha (1993)
- Cinqüenta anos de Chorinho (1990)
- Bem Brasil (1983)
- Clássicos em Choro Vol. 2 (1980)
- Clássicos em Choro (1979)
- Altamiro Carrilho (1978)
- Antologia da Flauta (1977)
- Antologia do Chorinho Vol. 2 (1977)
- Antologia da Canção Junina (1976)
- Antologia do Chorinho (1975)
- Pixinguinha, de Novo - Altamiro Carrilho e Carlos Poyares (1975)
- A flauta de prata e o bandolim de ouro - Altamiro Carrilho e Niquinho (1972)
- A furiosa ataca o sucesso (1972)
- Dois bicudos (1966)
- Altamiro Carrilho e sua bandinha no Largo da Matriz (1966)
- A banda é o sucesso (1966)
- Choros imortais nº 2 (1965)
- Uma flauta em serenata (1965)
- Altamiro Carrilho e sua bandinha nas Festas Juninas (1964)
- No mundo encantado das flautas de Altamiro Carrilho (1964)
- Choros imortais (1964)
- Recordar é Viver Nº 2(1963)
- Bossa Nova in Rio (1963)
- Recordar é Viver nº 3 (1963)
- A Bandinha viaja pelo Norte (1962)
- Vai Da Valsa (1961)
- Desfile de Sucessos (1961)
- O melhor para dançar - Flauta e Órgão (1961)
- Era só o que flautava (1960)
- A bordo do Vera Cruz (1960)
- Parada de Sucessos (1960)
- Chorinhos em desfile (1959)
- Dobrados em desfile (1959)
- Boleros em desfile nº 2 (1959)
- Altamiro Carrilho e sua bandinha na TV - nº 2 (1958)
- Homenagem ao Rei Momo (1958)
- Boleros em Desfile (1958)
- Enquanto houver amor (1958)
- Recordar é viver (1958)
- Revivendo Pattápio (1957)
- Altamiro Carrilho e sua flauta azul (1957)
- Ouvindo Altamiro Carrilho (1957)
- Natal (1957)
- Altamiro Carrilho e sua bandinha na TV (1957)
