= Marcos Valle =

Brazilian singer (born 1943)

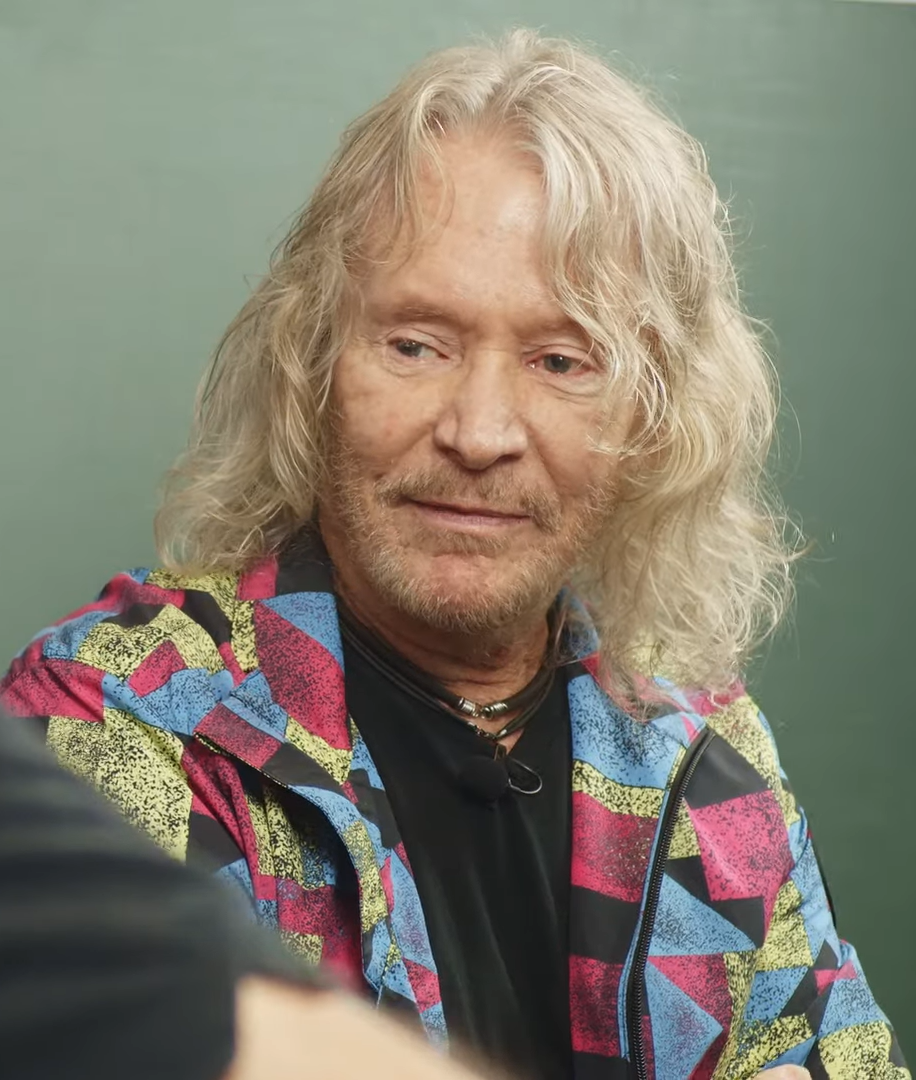
- Valle during an interview in 2019

Background information
- Born: Marcos Kostenbader Valle; September 14, 1943 (age 82); Rio de Janeiro, Brazil
- Genres: Samba, bossa nova, pop, psychedelic rock, soul, jazz, funk, lounge
- Occupations: Singer, musician, songwriter, record producer
- Instruments: Vocals, piano, guitar, harmonica, mandolin
- Years active: 1963–present
- Labels: Odeon, EMI, Far Out

Marcos Kostenbader Valle (born 14 September 1943) is a Brazilian singer-songwriter. He has produced works in many musical styles, including bossa nova, samba, and fusions of rock, soul, jazz, and dance music with Brazilian styles. Valle is credited for popularizing bossa nova in the 1960s.

== Personal life ==
Valle was born as Marcos Kostenbader Valle on 14 September 1943. He and his family lived in an apartment near Copacabana beach. Valle began playing piano at the age of five, studying the instrument and classical music for thirteen years. His parents purchased him a Petrof piano when he was ten years old. Growing up, he became influenced by Marvin Gaye. In 1963, he and his family lived in a house, and Antônio Carlos Jobim had just moved across the street from them. Valle is married to singer Patricia Alví. He was previously married to Anamaria de Carvalho, who served as the inspiration for his hit song "Os Grilos (Crickets Sing For Anamaria)".

== Career ==
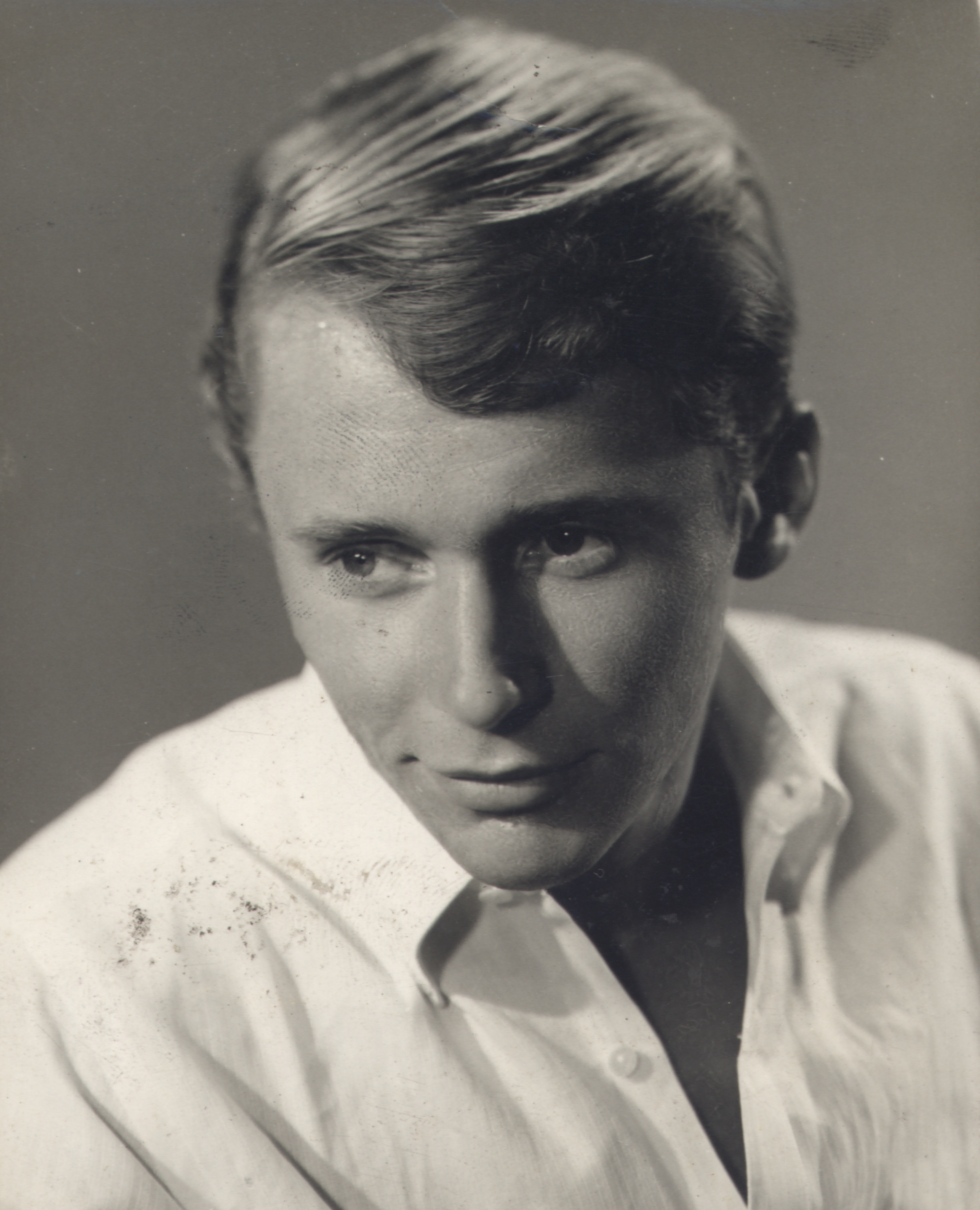
Valle c. 1960s

Valle began his career with the debut album Samba Demais in 1963. His second album O Compositor e o Cantor (1965) contained the hit single "Samba de Verão," known in English as "Summer Samba" or "So Nice." Walter Wanderley's rendition of the track entered the US Top 40 in 1966. Warner Brothers records released an album of instrumentals titled Braziliance! in 1967. Fearing he would be drafted for the Vietnam War, he moved back to Brazil.

During this period, Brazil's military dictatorship had started. He and his brother and lyricist Paulo Sérgio Valle, initially refrained from incorporating politically charged lyrics, but relented once Marcos returned to his country. According to Peter Margasak, Valle's songs "became increasingly gloomy and baroque, though its foundation never ceased to be samba and bossa nova."

Garra was released in 1971. Will Hodgkinson of The Times remarked that the track "Jesus Meu Rei", "sounds so much like Christian devotional pop that you would never guess it's about how much everyone hates Brazil's president." Valle also contributed to the Black Power movement with the track "Black Is Beautiful". Valle also contributed to the soundtrack for Vila Sésamo, a Brazilian version of Sesame Street.

Valle grew displeased with his life in Brazil. He took a break from performing live in 1975 and relocated to Los Angeles. Devoting more of his time as a composer and in recording studios, it would take years for him to regain confidence in performing, "Maybe it was five years [away from live performance] that time", as Valle claimed.

Vontade De Rever Você was released in 1981. With its tracks written alongside Leon Ware and Peter Cetera, and partially recorded with Chicago, Bush said it "offered an excellent example of boogie-funk samba." Valle released his second self-titled album Marcos Valle in 1982. He conceived the album as his way to celebrate Brazil's dissolution of the military government. Its track "Estrelar" was popular in Brazil but especially in Europe. Having written the track with Leon Ware, Valle said, "It's maybe more important than 'Summer Samba'. It was so nice that ['Summer Samba'] was a hit in the world. But 'Estrelar' was important to attract the young people from new generations and new cultures."

After releasing his soul-pop output Tempo da Gente in 1986, he continued his career of composing songs for films and television shows, and collaborating with other artists. The 1990s saw a revival in bossa-nova and an interest in Valle. He released Nova Bossa Nova in 1998. John Bush has seen him embrace "trends in the dance community" at that time, he said that its "production is crunchy and indebted to acid jazz (with even a drum 'n' bass breakbeat or two), while the title track and "Bahia Blue" are just as slick and well-produced as his '80s material."

In 2010, he released Estática, an album which saw him return to a more organic approach, albeit with the use of some analog synthesisers. The record features expansive horn and string arrangements and has been referred to as a "masterpiece" by some.

== Discography ==
- 1963: Samba "Demais" (Odeon)
- 1965: O Compositor e o Cantor (Odeon)
- 1966: Braziliance! (Warner/Odeon)
- 1968: Viola Enluarada (Odeon)
- 1968: Samba '68 (Verve)
- 1969: Mustang côr de Sangue (Odeon)
- 1970: Marcos Valle (Odeon)
- 1971: Garra (Odeon)
- 1972: Vento Sul (Odeon)
- 1973: Previsão do Tempo (Odeon)
- 1974: Marcos Valle (Odeon)
- 1981: Vontade de Rever Você (Som Livre)
- 1983: Marcos Valle (Som Livre)
- 1986: Tempo da Gente (Arca Som)
- 1998: Nova Bossa Nova (Far Out)
- 2001: Escape (Far Out)
- 2001: Bossa Entre Amigos (with Roberto Menescal and Wanda Sá) (Albatroz) – also on DVD
- 2003: Live in Montreal (with Victor Biglione) (Rob) – recorded in 2000
- 2003: Contrasts (Far Out)
- 2005: Jet Samba (Dubas)
- 2008: Conecta: Ao Vivo no Cinematheque (live) (EMI) – also on DVD
- 2009: Página Central (with Celso Fonseca) (Biscoito Fino)
- 2010: Estática (Far Out)
- 2011: Valle Tudo (EMI) – 11-CD box set – recorded 1963–1974
- 2012: Anos 80 (Discobertas) – 3-CD box set – recorded 1981–1986
- 2012: Ensaio (Warner) – recorded in 2001 – also on DVD
- 2013: Ao Vivo (with Stacey Kent) (Sony/BMG)
- 2016: Live at Birdland • New York City / From Tokyo to New York (with Stacey Kent) (Sony/BMG) – 1-CD/2-DVD box set
- 2018: Edu, Dori & Marcos (with Edu Lobo & Dori Caymmi) (Biscoito Fino)
- 2019: Sempre (Far Out)
- 2020: Cinzento (Deck/Polysom)
- 2024: Túnel Acustico

Contributions:

- 1981: vocals on "Something" on Sarah Vaughan's Songs of the Beatles
