= Lanny Gordin =

Brazilian guitarist and composer (1951–2023)

Alexander Gordin (28 November 1951 – 28 November 2023), better known as Lanny Gordin, was a Brazilian guitarist and composer who collaborated with artists such as Gal Costa, Gilberto Gil and Caetano Veloso, among others.

== Biography ==
Alexander Gordin was born in Shanghai, to a Russian father and a Polish mother. He grew up in Israel until age six, when his family moved to Brazil. There, his father owned a nightclub, Stardust, in São Paulo. Gordin played live there for the first time with artists such as Hermeto Pascoal and Heraldo do Monte.

Lanny Gordin's first major works were with artists from Jovem Guarda. One of his recordings from this period is the song "Nem Sim, Nem Não", by Eduardo Araújo, recorded in 1968. Gordin then began to play with artists from Tropicália, recording the albums Gal Costa (1969), Gal (1969), LeGal (1970) and Fatal - A Todo Vapor (1971), with Gal Costa; Caetano Veloso (also known as Album Branco), by Caetano Veloso (1969); Gilberto Gil (1969) and Expresso 2222 (1972), by Gilberto Gil. He also played in Jards Macalé's 1972 self-titled album.

From the end of the 1970s until the 1990s, Gordin lived practically ostracized, mainly due to his mental health (Lanny had developed schizophrenia at a young age) and drug abuse. He had a comeback in 2001, recording his first solo album, "Lanny Gordin", by the label Baratos Afins. From 2002 on, he played with the band Projeto Alfa.

Gordin died in São Paulo on his birthday, 28 November 2023, at the age of 72.

== Discography ==
=== With Rita Lee ===
- Build Up (1970)

=== With Gal Costa ===
- Gal Costa (1969)
- Gal (1969)
- LeGal (1970)
- -Fa-Tal- Gal a Todo Vapor (1972)

=== With Caetano Veloso ===
- Caetano Veloso (1969)
- Araçá Azul (1972)

=== With Gilberto Gil ===
- Gilberto Gil (1969)
- Expresso 2222 (1972)

=== With Chico César ===
- Aos Vivos (1995)

=== Solo ===
- Lanny Gordin (2001)
- Projeto Alfa, volume I e II (2004)
- Duos (2006)
- Lanny duos (2007)

=== With Jards Macalé ===
- Jards Macalé (1972)

=== With Hermeto Pascoal, Olmir Stocker and others ===
- Brazilian Octopus (1970)

=== With Alarde ===
- Amém (song from 2009)

== Bibliography ==
- Barcinski, André (2014). Pavões Misteriosos — 1974-1983: A explosão da música pop no Brasil. São Paulo: Três Estrelas. ISBN 978-85-653-3929-2.
