= Luiz Melodia =

Brazilian musician (1951–2017)

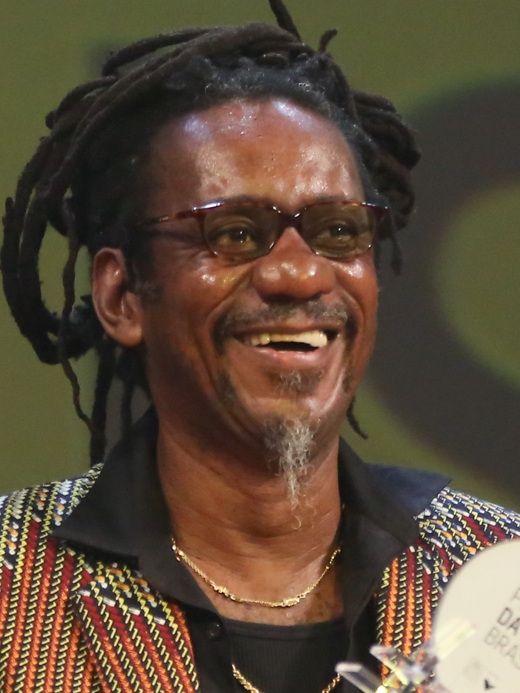
- Melodia, 2015

Background information
- Also known as: Estácio's Poet
- Born: Luiz Carlos dos Santos; 7 January 1951; Rio de Janeiro, Brazil
- Died: 4 August 2017 (aged 66) Rio de Janeiro, Brazil
- Genres: Música popular brasileira, Samba, Soul music
- Occupations: singer-songwriter, actor
- Instruments: acoustic guitar, piano
- Years active: 1963–2017

Luiz Carlos dos Santos (7 January 1951 – 4 August 2017), widely known by his stage name Luiz Melodia, was a Brazilian singer-songwriter whose music was a characteristic crossover of multiple music genres including Música popular brasileira (MPB), rock music, blues, soul music and samba. He has been described as 'one of the most important Brazilian-born musicians.'

Son of samba music dilettante Oswaldo 'Melodia' (whose epithet he took on as a stage name), Melodia grew up on a morro (a slum that stretches over a hillside, typical in Rio de Janeiro) in the Estácio district—often referred to as the 'birthplace [or cradle] of samba'. Melodia's first LP record, Pérola negra (Black Pearl), was released in 1973. He married fellow singer-songwriter and record producer Jane Reis, a Bahia native, in 1977; their only son, rapper Mahal Reis, was born in 1980. Melodia had another son, Iran, from a previous relationship. He has expressed pride in his Black identity.

Over the course of his career, Melodia released several studio albums and performed extensively in both Brazil and Europe. In 1987, he sang in Châteauvallon, France, and Bern, Switzerland. In 1992, he appeared at the III Folcalquier Music Festival, again in France, and, in 2004, at the Montreux Jazz Festival. In 2012, Melodia went on a big band tour throughout Europe, having performed in a number of cities including London, Paris and Berlin. He also played in Denmark, Switzerland and Portugal.

In 2015, Melodia was awarded Best Singer in the 26th Brazilian Music Awards. The 29th edition of the prize saw a posthumous tribute to his life's work, with the likes of Caetano Veloso and Maria Bethânia, among several others, performing famous Melodia songs. He was ranked 45th out of the 100 best Brazilian musicians and 27th out of the 100 best Brazilian voices by Rolling Stone.

Melodia enjoyed listening to Chet Baker, John Coltrane, and Jovem Guarda, a Brazilian pop music movement that originated in the early 1960s. He also worked briefly as an actor, appearing in the Globo soap opera "Bang-Bang."

== Early life ==
Melodia was born Luiz Carlos dos Santos in the Estácio district, Rio de Janeiro, on 7 January 1951. The only son of Oswaldo, a civil servant and amateur samba musician, and Eurídice, a seamstress, he first discovered music through his father, who played at home: "I would fetch his viola, try out a few chords and keep an eye on him. He never let me touch the 4-string viola, which really was a conversation piece, very beautiful. I learned a few things on it, though."

In light of his early affinity with music, Melodia decided to defy his father's wishes for him to finish school and pursue higher education. In 1963, alongside drummer-vocalist Walmir Lucena (aka Mizinho), Melodia started what would become a lifelong musical career. At the time, he took day jobs as a typographer, salesperson, and counter attendant while also working as a nightclub musician. After dropping out of middle school, likely in 1964, Melodia spent his teenage years writing songs (never recorded) and playing Jovem Guarda and bossa nova hits with his newly-formed band Os Instantâneos (The Swift Boys; could be intended as a pun for The Snapshots) alongside friends Manoel, Nazzareno and Mizinho. He was also in another band, Os Filhos do Sol (The Sons of the Sun); they played at parties, often singing in impromptu made-up English to fire up partygoers. Soon, well-connected morro scene habitués, Tropicália-related poet Waly Salomão and journalist Torquato Neto brought Melodia closer to the mainstream music industry. Over this period, he was partnered with vocalist Marquinhos Sathan, who went on to become a relatively successful singer a few years later.

A short lyrics excerpt is extant from his early period: 'Amo o céu e terra / e também o mar / amo a vontade que tenho de amar.' ('I love the sky and the earth / And the sea as well / I love this will to love that I have.')

== Career ==
=== 1970s ===
Thanks to the introductions Salomão and Neto got him, Melodia was able to approach singer Gal Costa with song "Presente cotidiano" (My everyday present), but due to official censorship in force at the time, Costa was prevented from performing it at her regular Copacabana concerts—the song was however recorded by Costa for her 1973 album Índia (Indian) and by Melodia himself in 1978 for album Mico de circo (Circus Monkey). Instead, Melodia offered Costa another song, "Pérola negra" (Black Pearl), which she live-recorded for album -Fa-Tal- Gal a Todo Vapor (Fatal—Gal at Full Steam). The song was an immediate hit.

In 1972, singer Maria Bethânia recorded Melodia's Estácio, holly Estácio (untranslatable; it is a reference to his birthplace Estácio and what seems to be a play on words with 'holy' and/or 'holiday') for her album pt:Drama - Anjo Exterminado (Drama—Exterminated Angel).

In 1973, Melodia, who by then already went by his stage name, released his first studio album Pérola Negra (Black Pearl). The album is described by pt:Rolling Stone Brasil (Brazil's edition of Rolling Stone magazine) as a 'contemporary wonder' (perhaps as an allusion to his second LP record's name; see below) and a 'masterpiece'. The album is consistently ranked as one of the best in Brazilian music history. (It was ranked 32nd out of 100 by Rolling Stone Brasil.) The title track, with its sleek arrangement for brass, double bass, voice and piano, was depicted as a 'tormented love song which stands as a hallmark to Melodia's oeuvre'.

Melodia's public personality was described as insubordinate, irreverent, and restless, thought to be a reflection of his samba scene background. This contributed to his developed reputation as a maudit (accursed) artist among critics, alongside others like Raimundo Fagner and João Bosco. Melodia stated: 'We weren't people that simply obeyed. You could say that we sidestepped the record label's house rules; we simply broke away from situations that weren't convenient. I have always believed in what I do."

In 1975, with song Ébano (Ebony), Melodia reached the finals of Festival Abertura (Start-out Festival), a singing-songwriting contest hosted by television channel Rede Globo. Backing him up on the occasion were members of an incipient Banda Black Rio (Black Rio band), as well as Azymuth's keyboardist Jose Roberto Bertrami.

Melodia's next album, Maravilhas contemporâneas (Contemporary Wonders) (1976), became popular thanks to song Juventude transviada (Deviant Youth), which featured in the soundtrack of Rede Globo's telenovela Pecado Capital (Capital Sin) by author Janete Clair.

Starting in 1977, Melodia became a contributor to Projeto Pixinguinha, sharing the stage with singers Zezé Motta and Marina Lima in tours around Brazil. Mico de Circo, another landmark, was released in 1978.

During the 1970s, Melodia was reported as leading a licentious life, having no papers or a bank account for some time, and carelessly spending all his money earned from performances.

=== 1980s and 1990s ===
Melodia released four albums between 1980 and 1991: Nós (We) (1980), Felino (Feline) (1983), Claro (Of Course) (1985) and Pintando o sete (Fooling Around) (1991). In Pintando o sete, Melodia included a version of hit song pt:Codinome Beija-Flor (I Go by Hummingbird), made legendary by singer Cazuza. In 1991, the song featured in the soundtrack of Dono do mundo (Owner of the World), another Rede Globo telenovela. 1995 saw the release of Relíquias (Mementos). In the same year, Melodia made a guest appearance on album Guitarra brasileira (Brazilian Guitar) by musical partner Renato Piau, being credited on two of the tracks.

In 1997, Melodia released 14 Quilates (14-carat). A year later, in 1998, he was featured on tribute album Balaio do Sampaio (Sampaio's Pouch) by pt:Sérgio Sampaio, who similarly to Melodia was known as a maudit artist. In 1999, he released a live acoustic album (Luiz Melodia: acústico, ao vivo) featuring guitarists pt:Renato Piau and Perinho Santana, which would result in a namesake concert tour the following year.

=== 2000–2008 ===
In 2001, Melodia released Retrato do artista quando coisa (Portrait of the Artist as a Thing), with string and wind arrangements on most tracks. The album sees his son Mahal making an appearance on Lorena. The title track, whose name makes an obvious reference to James Joyce's A Portrait of the Artist as a Young Man is set to verses by Brazilian poet Manoel de Barros. In 2002, Melodia released a CD & DVD box set entitled Luiz Melodia convida – ao vivo (Luiz Melodia and Guests—Live), recorded in Rio de Janeiro, which featured Zeca Pagodinho, Zezé Motta, Luciana Mello, and the legendary Elza Soares, among others. The set featured bonus track Presente cotidiano (My Everyday Present) as a studio-recorded duet with Gal Costa. He performed at pt:Parque dos Patins in 2005 for the project Vivo Na Lagoa (Live in Lagoa). In the same year he featured on album Um pouco de mim – Sergio Natureza e amigos (A Little Bit About Me—Sergio Natureza & Friends), on track Vela no breu (A Candle in the Darkness) by Paulinho da Viola and pt:Sergio Natureza. In 2006, he performed at Teatro Rival, in Rio de Janeiro and was featured on the cover of Carioquice magazine, a publication of the Cravo Albin Institute. He made an appearance that same year alongside pt:Eudes Fraga, Wanda Sá and Claudia Telles on CD Par ou Ímpar by pt:Marcelo Lessa and pt:Paulinho Tapajós, featuring on track Veludo azul (Blue Velvet). Soon afterwards, Melodia brooded the idea of getting involved in a samba project. In mid-2006, he had been invited to give a special performance in commemoration of the 70th anniversary of Teatro Rival. The focal point was samba songs from different periods. His project resulted in a concert and, to some extent, this became the album Estação Melodia (Melodia Station) (2007) and also formed the basis of an MTV Brasil special. In 2008, he was awarded the Prêmio Rival (Rival Award).

=== Later years and release of Zerima (2014) ===
In 2011, Melodia was a guest on fourth solo album by Titãs band member Sérgio Britto Purabossanova (a portmanteau for Pure Bossa Nova), which was released in September that year. In 2013, he held further concerts at Teatro Rival. In the same year, a multi-CD box set was released called Três tons de Luiz Melodia (Three Shades [could be "Tones"] of Luiz Melodia) containing three albums from three different decades: Pérola negra, from 1973; Felino, from 1983; and Pintando o sete, from 1991.

In 2014, during a concert at Teatro Rival, Melodia released his 13th solo album pt:Zerima (an anagram for Marize, his sister's name, who had died two years earlier), recorded at Som Livre studios. Zerima ended a 13-year gap in Melodia's musical career; in it, he reconnects with his samba and bossa nova roots. New compositions included Cheia de Graça (Full of Grace), as well as Dor de carnaval (Carnival Heartache) with special guest singer-songwriter Céu.

Melodia did not feel that his commercial success reflected the true value of his music. In an interview, he stated: 'By the way, other musicians don't get [why I didn't achieve as much fame as I deserved]. Djavan said it once, and so did Caetano Veloso. It's a conundrum to many people. I don't really get it myself'. And: 'I still don't have that privilege [of being duly recognised]. Which is something my music certainly deserved. I may be wrong, but I think I was even cut off more than once: I didn't get that much attention from record labels I signed with. I know my work isn't that voluminous, but I think it should have gotten a lot more attention. It takes a certain budget to promote an artist, for marketing expenses. I never got that, except back then at the beginning.'

== Order of Cultural Merit ==
Melodia was awarded the Ordem do Mérito Cultural (Order of Cultural Merit) in 2011.

== Death ==
Luiz Melodia died on 4 August 2017 at the age of 66 in his hometown of Rio de Janeiro from bone marrow cancer.

== Discography ==
- Pérola Negra (1973)
- Maravilhas contemporâneas (1976)
- Mico de circo (1978)
- Nós (1980)
- Felino (1983)
- Claro (1988)
- Pintando o sete (1991)
- Relíquias (1995)
- 14 Quilates (1997)
- Acústico ao vivo (1999)
- Luiz Melodia convida – DVD (2003)
- Estação Melodia (2007)
- Zerima (2014)
