= Índia =

Studio album by Gal Costa
- Released: 1973
- Studio: Phonogram, Rio de Janeiro; Eldorado, São Paulo
- Genre: MPB
- Length: 38:34
- Label: Philips
- Producer: Guilherme Araújo

Gal Costa chronology
-Fa-Tal- Gal a Todo Vapor (1971)	Índia (1973)	Cantar (1974)

Uncensored cover

Índia is the fourth studio album by Brazilian singer Gal Costa, released on 1973 by Philips Records. Its major hits were "Índia", "Volta" and "Desafinado".

== Music ==
Índia is an MPB album, with influences from tropicália, folk, psychedelic, jazz, funk and rock.

== Artwork ==
The artwork depicts Gal Costa semi-nude with indigenous Brazilian clothing. It was originally censored by the Brazilian military government, but the full artwork was released by Costa in 2015. She stated in her Instagram: "To our delight, including mine".

== Release ==
The album was released on 1973 by Philips Records, and reissued with the original uncensored cover in 2017, by Mr Bongo Records.

== Reception ==
Professional ratings
Retrospective reviews (published after 1973)
Review scores
Source	Rating
AllMusic	5/5 stars
Pitchfork	8.5/10
Uncut	4.5/5 stars

Índia received widespread acclaim by critics.

== Track listing ==
Side one
No.	Title	Writer(s)	Length
1.	"Índia"	José Asunción Flores, Manuel O. Guerrero, José Fortuna	6:59
2.	"Milho Verde"	Zeca Afonso, traditional	4:29
3.	"Presente Cotidiano"	Luiz Melodia	3:03
4.	"Volta"	Lupicínio Rodrigues	3:22

Side two
No.	Title	Writer(s)	Length
5.	"Relance"	Caetano Veloso, Pedro Novis	5:06
6.	"Da Maior Importância"	Caetano Veloso	5:18
7.	"Passarinho"	Tuzé de Abreu	5:35
8.	"Pontos de Luz"	Jards Macalé, Waly Salomão	2:48
9.	"Desafinado"	Tom Jobim, Newton Mendonça	2:40

== Personnel ==
Adapted from AllMusic.

- Guilherme Araújo — production
- Edú Mello e Souza — studio directing
- Luigi Hoffer — technician, mixing
- Marcus Vinicius — technician, mixing
- Ary Carvalhaes — mixing
- Gilberto Gil — musical directing, acoustic guitar, 12-string acoustic guitar
- Antonio Guerreiro — photograph
- Waly Salomão — artwork
- Dominguinhos — accordion
- Toninho Horta — electric guitar
- Luiz Alves — contrabass
- Roberto Silva — drums
- Chico Batera — percussion and special effects
- Rogério Duprat — arrangement
- Arthur Verocai — arrangement ("Pontos de Luz", "Presente Cotidiano")
- Mario Tavares — strings ("Índia")
- Tenório Jr. — organ ("Volta")
- Roberto Menescal — acoustic guitar ("Desafinado")
- Wagner Tiso — organ ("Pontos de Luz" e "Presente Cotidiano")
- Chacal — percussion ("Milho Verde")
