= Gal (1969 album) =

Studio album by Gal Costa
- Released: 1969
- Genre: Tropicália; psychedelic rock
- Length: 35:31
- Label: Philips; Dusty Groove (reissue)
- Producer: Manoel Barenbein

Gal Costa chronology
Gal Costa (1969)	Gal (1969)	Legal (1970)

Professional ratings
Review scores
Source	Rating
Allmusic	5/5 stars

Gal or Gal Costa is the second album by Brazilian singer Gal Costa, released months after the first album Gal Costa. To distinguish it from Costa's previous release, the album is sometimes referred to as Cinema Olympia, the title of its first track. It is considered by the public and critics alike as her most psychedelic and experimental album. The music in the album has been considered unprecedented. Andy Beta of The Pitchfork Review described the album as "the equivalent of Barbra Streisand recording with Boredoms" and "one of the heaviest documents of Tropicália."

== Track listing ==
Side one
No.	Title	Writer(s)	Length
1.	"Cinema Olympia"	Caetano Veloso	3:09
2.	"Tuareg"	Jorge Ben	3:25
3.	"Cultura e Civilização"	Gilberto Gil	4:21
4.	"País Tropical"	Jorge Ben	3:49
5.	"Meu Nome é Gal"	Roberto Carlos, Erasmo Carlos	3:26

Side two
No.	Title	Writer(s)	Length
6.	"Com Medo, Com Pedro"	Gilberto Gil	3:07
7.	"The Empty Boat"	Caetano Veloso	4:07
8.	"Objeto Sim, Objeto Não"	Gilberto Gil	5:10
9.	"Pulsars e Quasars"	Jards Macalé, Capinam	4:58

== Personnel ==
Credits are adapted from the album's liner notes.

- Gal Costa – vocals
- Manoel Barenbein – production
- Dircinho – illustration
- Rogério Duprat – arrangement
- Diogenes Burani Filho – drums
- Freitas – Photography
- Alexander Gordin – guitar, bass
- Rodolpho Grani Júnior - bass
- Dudu Portes – drums
- Jards Macalé – guitar
- Caetano Veloso – liner notes
