= Pérola Negra =

Studio album by Luiz Melodia
- Released: 1973
- Genres: Soul; Samba; Rock
- Length: 28:55
- Label: Philips Records

Luiz Melodia chronology
Pérola Negra (1973)	Maravilhas contemporâneas (1976)

Pérola Negra is the debut studio album by Brazilian musician Luiz Melodia, released in 1973 by Philips Records.

== Background ==
Produced by Péricles Albuquerque, the recording of Luiz Melodia's debut album followed the success of Gal Costa's and Maria Bethânia's 1971 and 1972 recordings of the songs "Pérola Negra" and "Estácio, Holy Estácio", respectively, both composed by Melodia. The album features songs written by Melodia, with guest appearances including Hyldon, Arthur Verocai and Robertinho Silva.

The album blends samba, soul, rock, and urban lyricism.

== Track list ==
All tracks are written by Luiz Melodia.

No.	Title	Writer(s)	Length
1.	"Estácio, Eu e Você"	Luiz Melodia	2:14
2.	"Vale Quanto Pesa"	Luiz Melodia	3:08
3.	"Estácio, Holly Estácio"	Luiz Melodia	2:26
4.	"Pra Aquietar"	Luiz Melodia	2:10
5.	"Abundantemente Morte"	Luiz Melodia	3:25
6.	"Pérola Negra"	Luiz Melodia	2:47
7.	"Magrelinha"	Luiz Melodia	2:06
8.	"Farrapo Humano"	Luiz Melodia	3:06
9.	"Objeto"	Luiz Melodia	2:23
10.	"Forró de Janeiro"	Luiz Melodia	3:10
Total length:			28:55

== Reception ==
Released in 1973, the album was not a commercial success. In 2024, the album was re-released in a remastered vinyl edition.

=== Critical ===
Roberto de Moura, writing for the newspaper Tribuna da Imprensa, gave the album a negative review, stating, "Melodia’s debut LP didn’t turn out as expected, though it wasn’t necessarily a disappointment."

== Legacy ==
In 2007, Rolling Stone Brasil magazine, after compiling a list of the 100 greatest Brazilian albums, ranked the album at 32nd. In 2020, journalist and writer Luiz Felipe Carneiro reviewed the album, stating that it is "well-rounded and flows smoothly from start to finish. It’s an album that’s both traditional and modern at the same time."

In a poll conducted in May 2022, the album ranked 21st a list of the 500 best Brazilian albums, according to a survey of more than 160 music experts conducted by the Discoteca Básica podcast.The 1976 album, Maravilhas Contemporâneas, by Melodia, is also mentioned on the list at number 261.

In 2023, music critic and journalist Mauro Ferreira, in his blog on G1, praised the album and stated, "Luiz Melodia would go on to create other contemporary masterpieces in his discography until he retired from the music scene at age 66 in 2017. But none had the brilliance of Pérola Negra, one of the best debut albums by an artist of all time, both in Brazil and abroad."

== Personnel ==
The following musicians worked on the album:

- Luiz Melodia - Vocals
- Perinho Albuquerque - Acoustic guitar; electric guitar
- Hyldon - Electric guitar
- Renato Piau - Electric guitar
- Rubão Sabino - Bass
- Fernando Leporace - Bass
- Robertinho Silva - Percussion
- Luis Paraguai - Percussion
- Don Lula Nascimento - Drums; percussion
- Antonio Perna Fróes - Piano
- Hugo Bellard - Piano
- Rildo Hora - Harmonica
- Altamiro Carrilho - Flute
- Márcio Montarroyos - Trumpet
- Dominguinhos - Accordion
- Daminhão Experiença - Vocals (on "Forró de Janeiro")
- Arthur Verocai - Arrangements
