= Recanto =

Studio album by Gal Costa
- Released: December 9, 2011
- Genre: Trip hop, MPB, Tropicália, electronic, experimental
- Label: Universal Music (CD – 2011)
- Producer: Caetano Veloso

Gal Costa chronology
Ao Vivo (2006)	Recanto (2011)

Recanto is an album by Brazilian singer Gal Costa, released in 2011. The album was written and produced by Caetano Veloso.

== Track listing ==
1. "Recanto Escuro" (3:51)
2. "Cara do Mundo" (2:52)
3. "Autotune Autoerótico" (3:40)
4. "Tudo Dói" (2:41)
5. "Neguinho" (5:35)
6. "O Menino" (4:28)
7. "Madre Deus" (3:35)
8. "Mansidão" (3:32)
9. "Sexo e Dinheiro" (3:40)
10. "Miami Maculelê" (4:06)
11. "Segunda" (3:49)

== Personnel ==
- Caetano Veloso – Producer
- Moreno Veloso - Engineer, Producer
- Kassin - Producer
