= -Fa-Tal- Gal a Todo Vapor =

Live album by Gal Costa
- Released: 1971
- Genre: MPB, psychedelic rock
- Length: 67:36
- Label: Phillips
- Producer: Roberto Menescal

Gal Costa chronology
| Legal (1970) | -Fa-Tal- Gal a Todo Vapor (1971) | Índia (1973) |

Professional ratings
Review scores
| Source | Rating |
|---|---|
| AllMusic | 4/5 stars |

-Fa-Tal- Gal a Todo Vapor is the first live album by Brazilian singer Gal Costa, released in 1971. It was ranked the 20th best Brazilian album of all time by the Brazilian Rolling Stone magazine.

== Track listing ==
Side one
| No. | Title | Writer(s) | Length |
|---|---|---|---|
| 1. | "Fruta Gogoia" | folk song | 0:39 |
| 2. | "Charles Anjo 45" | Jorge Ben | 0:26 |
| 3. | "Como 2 e 2" | Caetano Veloso | 2:46 |
| 4. | "Coração Vagabundo" | Caetano Veloso | 3:45 |
| 5. | "Falsa Baiana" | Geraldo Pereira | 5:37 |
| 6. | "Antonico" | Ismael Silva | 4:45 |

Side two
| No. | Title | Writer(s) | Length |
|---|---|---|---|
| 7. | "Sua Estupidez" | Roberto Carlos, Erasmo Carlos | 4:04 |
| 8. | "Fruta Gogoia" | folk song | 1:06 |
| 9. | "Vapor Barato" | Jards Macalé, Waly Salomão | 8:38 |

Side three
| No. | Title | Writer(s) | Length |
|---|---|---|---|
| 10. | "Dê um Rolê" | Moraes Moreira, Luiz Galvão | 4:06 |
| 11. | "Pérola Negra" | Luiz Melodia | 4:45 |
| 12. | "Mal Secreto" | Jards Macalé, Waly Salomão | 5:02 |
| 13. | "Como 2 e 2" | Caetano Veloso | 4:32 |

Side four
| No. | Title | Writer(s) | Length |
|---|---|---|---|
| 14. | "Hotel das Estrelas" | Jards Macalé, Duda Machado | 4:30 |
| 15. | "Assum Preto" | Luiz Gonzaga, Humberto Teixeira | 3:49 |
| 16. | "Bota a Mão nas Cadeiras" | folk song | 1:09 |
| 17. | "Maria Bethânia" | Caetano Veloso | 0:45 |
| 18. | "Não Se Esqueça de Mim" (previously titled "Chuva, Suor e Cerveja" by Caetano Veloso) | Caetano Veloso | 1:59 |
| 19. | "Luz do Sol" | Waly Salomão, Carlos Pinto | 5:24 |
