= Água Viva =

Água Viva may refer to:

- Água Viva (album), a 1978 album by Gal Costa
- Água Viva (TV series), a 1980 Brazilian telenovela
- Água Viva (novel), a novel by Clarice Lispector
