= Legal (Gal Costa album) =

Studio album by Gal Costa
- Released: 1970
- Recorded: 1969
- Genre: MPB
- Length: 33:02
- Label: Philips/PolyGram
- Producer: Manoel Barenbein

Gal Costa chronology
Gal (1969)	Legal (1970)	-Fa-Tal- Gal a Todo Vapor (1971)

Professional ratings
Review scores
Source	Rating
Allmusic	4/5 stars

Legal is an album by Brazilian singer-songwriter Gal Costa, released in 1970. The album returns to an accessible style following the experimental previous self-titled album Gal Costa of 1969. Legal is diversely influenced by psychedelic music, blues, and R&B.

The album cover is designed by Brazilian artist Hélio Oiticica.

== Track listing ==
Side one
No.	Title	Writer(s)	Length
1.	"Eu Sou Terrível"	Roberto Carlos, Erasmo Carlos	2:30
2.	"Língua do P"	Gilberto Gil	3:40
3.	"Love, Try and Die"	Gal Costa, Jards Macalé, Lanny Gordin	2:23
4.	"Mini-Mistério"	Gilberto Gil	4:16
5.	"Acauã"	Zé Dantas	2:49

Side two
No.	Title	Writer(s)	Length
6.	"Hotel das Estrelas"	Jards Macalé, Duda Machado	4:22
7.	"Deixa Sangrar (Carnaval 1971)"	Caetano Veloso	2:53
8.	"The Archaic Lonely Star Blues"	Jards Macalé, Duda Machado	3:03
9.	"London, London"	Caetano Veloso	4:00
10.	"Falsa Baiana"	Geraldo Pereira	2:11

== Personnel ==
- Gal Costa - Vocals
- Chiquinho de Moraes - Arrangement, piano
- Jards Macalé - Arrangement
- Lanny Gordin - Arrangement, guitar
- Hélio Oiticica - Artwork
- Claudio Bertrami - Bass
- Norival Ricardo D'Angelo - Drums
- Manoel Barenbein - Production
- Ary Carvalhaes - Recording engineer
- João Pereira - Recording engineer

== Miscellanea ==
"Legal" means "Nice" (or "cool") and it's an analogy to the singer's name, Gal.
