= Crazy He Calls Me =

1949 jazz standard by Carl Sigman and Bob Russell

Song
- Published: 1949 by Massey Music Co.
- Composer: Carl Sigman
- Lyricist: Bob Russell

"Crazy He Calls Me" is a 1949 jazz standard. It was composed by Carl Sigman, with lyrics by Bob Russell.

== Notable recordings ==
There have been many artists who've recorded the song, among them:

- American jazz singer Billie Holiday
- Dinah Washington (with Clifford Brown)
- Natalie Cole
- Anita O'Day
- Claire Martin
- Cassandra Wilson
- Dakota Staton
- Marlena Studer
- Aretha Franklin (1969) on her Soul '69 LP.
- Gal Costa recorded a Portuguese version, "Louca Me Chamam", included in her 1977 Caras E Bocas album, with lyrics by Augusto De Campos
- Linda Ronstadt in What's New (1983)
- Thea Gilmore on her favorites album These Quiet Friends (2025)

As "Crazy She Calls Me", it has also been recorded by:

- Nat King Cole
- Jackie Wilson
- Tony Bennett
- Sam Cooke
- Rod Stewart

== See also ==
- List of jazz standards
