= Domingo (Gal Costa and Caetano Veloso album) =

Studio album by Gal Costa and Caetano Veloso
- Released: 1967
- Recorded: 1967
- Studios: Philips Studios, Rio de Janeiro, Brazil
- Genres: Bossa nova; MPB
- Length: 31:02
- Label: Philips
- Producer: Dori Caymmi

Gal Costa chronology
Domingo (1967)	Gal Costa (1969)

Caetano Veloso chronology
Domingo (1967)	Caetano Veloso (1968)

Domingo (transl. Sunday) is the debut studio album by Gal Costa and Caetano Veloso. It was released on Philips Records in 1967.

== Critical reception ==
Professional ratings
Review scores
Source	Rating
AllMusic	4.5/5 stars

Richard Mortifoglio of AllMusic described the album as "a quiet, post-bossa nova effort characterized by fine singing and some very good songs, some of them penned by Veloso himself." Rob Arcand of Vice wrote, "Caetano Veloso would become an especially strong proponent of the acoustic style of João Gilberto; his 1967 debut album Domingo offered a near-perfect recreation of the soft voice and playing style of the Bahia native, even as his lyrics had more to do with staying strong amid political uncertainty than lazing about on the Ipanema shores."

== Track listing ==
All tracks are written by Caetano Veloso, except where noted.

Side one
No.	Title	Writer(s)	Lead vocals	Length
1.	"Coração Vagabundo"		Gal Costa; Caetano Veloso	2:25
2.	"Onde Eu Nasci Passa um Rio"		Veloso	1:59
3.	"Avarandado"		Costa	2:45
4.	"Um Dia"		Veloso	3:31
5.	"Domingo"		Costa; Veloso	1:25
6.	"Nenhuma Dor"	Veloso; Torquato Neto	Costa	1:33

Side two
No.	Title	Writer(s)	Lead vocals	Length
7.	"Candeias"	Edu Lobo	Costa	3:11
8.	"Remelexo"		Veloso	1:54
9.	"Minha Senhora"	Gilberto Gil; Neto	Costa	4:14
10.	"Quem Me Dera"		Veloso	3:24
11.	"Maria Joana"	Sidney Miller	Costa	1:42
12.	"Zabelê"	Gil; Neto	Costa; Veloso	2:49

== Personnel ==
Credits adapted from liner notes.

- Gal Costa – vocals
- Caetano Veloso – vocals
- Dori Caymmi – arrangement (1, 2), production, acoustic guitar
- Francis Hime – arrangement (3, 4)
- Roberto Menescal – arrangement (5)
