= Expresso 2222 =

Studio album by Gilberto Gil
- Released: 1972
- Genre: Tropicália, MPB
- Length: 34:01
- Label: Philips Records

Gilberto Gil chronology
Barra 69: Caetano e Gil Ao Vivo na Bahia (1972)	Expresso 2222 (1972)	Gilberto Gil Ao Vivo (1974)

Professional ratings
Review scores
Source	Rating
Allmusic	4.5/5 stars
Tom Hull – on the Web	B+

Expresso 2222 is the fifth studio album by Brazilian artist Gilberto Gil, released in June 1972 by Philips Records (currently Universal Music). In October 2007, the magazine Rolling Stone's Brazilian edition published a list of the 100 Greatest Albums of Brazilian Music, in which Expresso 2222 featured at number 26.

The album name is a homage to a train that Gil used to take to head out of his native town in the direction of Salvador, Bahia. The album marks the return of Gil to Brazil after a three-year exile in London.

== Track listing ==
1. "Pipoca Moderna" (Sebastião C. Biano) – 01:57
2. "Back in Bahia" (Gilberto Gil) – 04:35
3. "O Canto da Ema" (João do Valle / Aires Viana / Alventino Cavalcanti) – 06:20
4. "Chiclete com Banana" (Almira Castilho/Gordurinha) – 03:23
5. "Ele e Eu" (Gilberto Gil) – 02:17
6. "Sai do Sereno" (Onildo Almeida) – 03:20
7. "Expresso 2222" (Gilberto Gil) – 02:38
8. "O Sonho Acabou" (Gilberto Gil) – 03:32
9. "Oriente" (Gilberto Gil) – 05:59

CD bonus tracks

1. "Cada Macaco no seu Galho" (Riachão) – 04:23
2. "Vamos Passear no Astral" (Gilberto Gil) – 02:54
3. "Está na Cara, Está na Cura" (Gilberto Gil) – 02:38
