= Gal Costa (album) =

Studio album by Gal Costa
- Released: 1969
- Genres: Tropicália; psychedelic pop; art pop; bossa nova
- Length: 39:12
- Labels: Phillips; Dusty Groove (reissue)
- Producer: Manuel Barenbein

Gal Costa chronology
Domingo (1967)	Gal Costa (1969)	Gal (1969)

Professional ratings
Review scores
Source	Rating
AllMusic	5/5 stars
Encyclopedia of Popular Music	4/5 stars
MusicHound World	4.5/5 stars
Music Story	4.5/5 stars

Gal Costa is the first solo album by the Brazilian singer Gal Costa, released in 1969. It was ranked the 80th best Brazilian album of all time by the Brazilian Rolling Stone magazine.

Considered one of the most representative records of the countercultural Tropicália movement, the album features songwriting by various artists associated with the movement, with whom Costa had previously worked with in the 1968 collaboration album Tropicália: ou Panis et Circencis. These include Caetano Veloso, Gilberto Gil and Torquato Neto.

== Composition ==
The music in the album has been considered unprecedented. It represents a strong departure from the style of Domingo, her debut album recorded with Caetano Veloso, which featured a "set of airy, somewhat standard bossa nova tunes". Writing for Brazilian edition of Rolling Stone, Marcus Petro considered that, despite incorporating new influences from Janis Joplin and James Brown, Costa's music still retained strong bossa nova elements. The sound of Gal Costa has been called "truly psychedelic and very much of its time, but also full of subtlety, as befits the melodic complexity and harmonic freedom" of its songs.

== Track listing ==
Side one
No.	Title	Writer(s)	Length
1.	"Não Identificado"	Caetano Veloso	3:12
2.	"Sebastiana"	Rosil Cavalcanti	2:23
3.	"Lost in the Paradise"	Caetano Veloso	2:52
4.	"Namorinho de Portão"	Tom Zé	2:34
5.	"Saudosismo"	Caetano Veloso	3:10
6.	"Se Você Pensa"	Roberto Carlos, Erasmo Carlos	3:15

Side two
No.	Title	Writer(s)	Length
7.	"Vou Recomeçar"	Roberto Carlos, Erasmo Carlos	3:25
8.	"Divino, Maravilhoso"	Caetano Veloso, Gilberto Gil	4:13
9.	"Que Pena (Ele Já Não Gosta Mais de Mim)"	Jorge Ben	3:33
10.	"Baby"	Caetano Veloso	3:33
11.	"A Coisa Mais Linda Que Existe"	Gilberto Gil, Torquato Neto	4:00
12.	"Deus é o Amor"	Jorge Ben	3:05
