= Caras & Bocas (album) =

Studio album by Gal Costa
- Released: 1977
- Genre: MPB
- Length: 42:13
- Label: Philips, PolyGram, Polydor

Gal Costa chronology
Gal Canta Caymmi (1975)	Caras & Bocas (1977)	Água Viva (1978)

Caras & Bocas (transl. Faces and Mouths) is an album by Brazilian singer Gal Costa released in 1977.

== Track listing ==
1. "Caras e Bocas" (Caetano Veloso, Maria Bethânia) 4:04
2. "Me Recuso" (Rita Lee, Luis Sergio, Lee Marcucci) 4:09
3. "Louca Me Chamam" ("Crazy He Calls Me") (Carl Sigman, Bob Russell; Portuguese Translations by Augusto de Campos) 3:26
4. "Clariô" (Pericles Cavalcanti) 4:57
5. "Minha Estrela É Do Oriente" (Tindoró Dindinha) (Jorge Ben) 2:55
6. "Tigresa" (Veloso) 4:12
7. "Negro Amor" ("It's All Over Now, Baby Blue") (Bob Dylan; Portuguese Translations by Caetano Veloso and Pericles Cavalcanti) 6:16
8. "Meu Doce Amor" (Marina, Duda Machado) 2:36
9. "(In My) Solitude" (Duke Ellington, Irving Mills, Eddie DeLange; Portuguese Translations by Augusto de Campos) 3:12
10. "Um Favor" (Lupicínio Rodrigues) 5:58
