= Caetano Veloso (1968 album) =

Studio album by Caetano Veloso
- Released: 1968
- Genre: Tropicália
- Length: 34:54
- Label: Philips
- Producer: Manuel Barenbein

Caetano Veloso chronology
Domingo (1967)	Caetano Veloso (1968)	Caetano Veloso (1969)

Caetano Veloso is the debut solo album by the artist of the same name, released in Brazil in 1968. He had released Domingo the year before in collaboration with Gal Costa. It was one of the first Tropicália efforts, and features arrangements by Júlio Medaglia, Damiano Cozzella, and Sandino Hohagen, as well as an eclectic assortment of influences, demonstrating the "antropofagia" (artistic cannibalism) of the Tropicália movement. Sounds from psychedelia, rock, pop, Indian music, bossa nova, Bahian music and other genres appear on the album. It includes the hit songs "Alegria, Alegria", "Tropicália", and "Soy loco por ti, América".

== Background ==
Recorded to capitalize on the success of the forward-looking "Alegria, Alegria" at the TV Record Festival, the album mostly continued in the new direction in which Caetano and his fellow tropicalistas (though that term had not yet been employed to describe them) wanted to take Brazilian popular music. Where his debut Domingo had been primarily based on more traditional Brazilian musical styles such as bossa nova, his second album relied heavily on sounds and instrumentation more common to rock and roll and psychedelia.

== Notable songs ==
=== "Tropicália" ===
The album's opener gets its title from the Hélio Oiticica installation of the same name; Caetano's appropriation of the title was the basis for his initial association with the term, which later lent its name to the art movement of which he was a central figure, Tropicalismo. The song's lyrics do not mention the title or refer to it directly. In fact, Caetano had already completed the song's composition when film producer Luiz Carlos Barreto suggested "Tropicália" as its title, seeing similarities between its content and that of the art exhibit. Caetano, who had never heard of Oiticica or his work up to that point, resolved to use the title until he found a better one, which he never did.

The Noel Rosa song "Coisas nossas", with its listing of various elements of Brazilian society, inspired the lyrics to "Tropicália", which similarly list cultural icons, such as the Portuguese-born but Brazilian-raised international superstar Carmen Miranda, a line from the popular Roberto Carlos song "Quero que tudo vá pro inferno", and the Louis Malle film Viva Maria.

The song was voted by the Brazilian edition of Rolling Stone as the 21st greatest Brazilian song.

== Reception ==
Professional ratings
Review scores
Source	Rating
AllMusic	5/5 stars
Pitchfork	9.4/10

Caetano has expressed displeasure with the album, calling it "amateurish and confused", but it is widely regarded as a classic, often showing up on lists of greatest Brazilian albums. It was very popular upon its release in Brazil, and the Brazilian press used the song title "Tropicália" to christen the larger artistic movement it represented "Tropicalismo", to the disdain of Caetano himself. The album was inducted into the Latin Grammy Award Hall of Fame in 2001. The album appears in Robert Dimery's 1001 Albums You Must Hear Before You Die.

== Track listing ==
All tracks are written by Caetano Veloso except where noted.

Side one
No.	Title	Length
1.	"Tropicália"	3:40
2.	"Clarice" (Caetano Veloso, José Carlos Capinam)	5:31
3.	"No Dia em que Eu Vim-Me Embora" (Caetano Veloso, Gilberto Gil)	2:26
4.	"Alegria, Alegria"	2:43
5.	"Onde Andarás?" (Caetano Veloso, Ferreira Gullar)	1:55
6.	"Anunciação" (Caetano Veloso, Rogério Duarte)	2:01

Side two
No.	Title	Length
7.	"Superbacana"	1:28
8.	"Paisagem Útil"	2:35
9.	"Clara (feat. Gal Costa)" (Caetano Veloso, Perinho Albuquerque)	2:43
10.	"Soy loco por ti, América" (Gilberto Gil, José Carlos Capinam)	3:40
11.	"Ave-Maria"	2:06
12.	"Eles" (Caetano Veloso, Gilberto Gil)	4:40

== Personnel ==
- Caetano Veloso – Guitar, vocals, liner notes
- David Drew Zingg – Photography
- Rogerio Duarte - Album cover project idealization
- Liana d'Urso - Album cover illustration and final art
- Paulo Oliveira - Album cover typography art
