= Cantar (album) =

Studio album by Gal Costa
- Released: 1974
- Genre: MPB
- Length: 33:37
- Label: Phillips
- Producer: Caetano Veloso, Perinho Albuquerque

Gal Costa chronology
| Índia (1973) | Cantar (1974) | Gal Canta Caymmi (1976) |

Cantar is the fifth solo album by the Brazilian singer Gal Costa, released in 1974. It was ranked the 91st best Brazilian album of all time by the Brazilian Rolling Stone magazine.

== Track listing ==
Side one
| No. | Title | Writer(s) | Length |
|---|---|---|---|
| 1. | "Barato Total" | Gilberto Gil | 3:48 |
| 2. | "A Rã" | Caetano Veloso, João Donato | 3:52 |
| 3. | "Lua, Lua, Lua, Lua" | Caetano Veloso | 3:02 |
| 4. | "Canção Que Morre no Ar" | Carlos Lyra, Ronaldo Bôscoli | 1:50 |
| 5. | "Flor de Maracujá" | João Donato, Lysias Ênio | 2:56 |

Side two
| No. | Title | Writer(s) | Length |
|---|---|---|---|
| 6. | "Flor do Cerrado" | Caetano Veloso | 3:13 |
| 7. | "Joia" | Caetano Veloso | 3:24 |
| 8. | "Até Quem Sabe" | João Donato, Lysias Ênio | 3:39 |
| 9. | "O Céu e o Som" | Péricles Cavalcanti | 3:00 |
| 10. | "Lágrimas Negras" | Jorge Mautner, Nélson Jacobina | 3:31 |
| 11. | "Chululu" | Mariah Costa | 0:56 |
