= Dusty Groove =

American online record store

Coordinates: 41°54′7.805″N 87°40′4.123″W

- Type: Private
- Industry: Record store
- Founded: April 1996, Chicago, United States
- Founder: Rick Wojcik and JP Schauer
- Headquarters: Chicago, United States
- Area served: Worldwide (ships to US and international destinations)
- Services: New and used music sales
- Owner: Dusty Holdings, LLC (Illinois)
- Website: www.dustygroove.com

Dusty Groove is a Chicago-based online and brick-and-mortar record store specializing in new and vintage jazz, funk, soul, hip-hop, world, rare, collectible, and vinyl records and CDs.

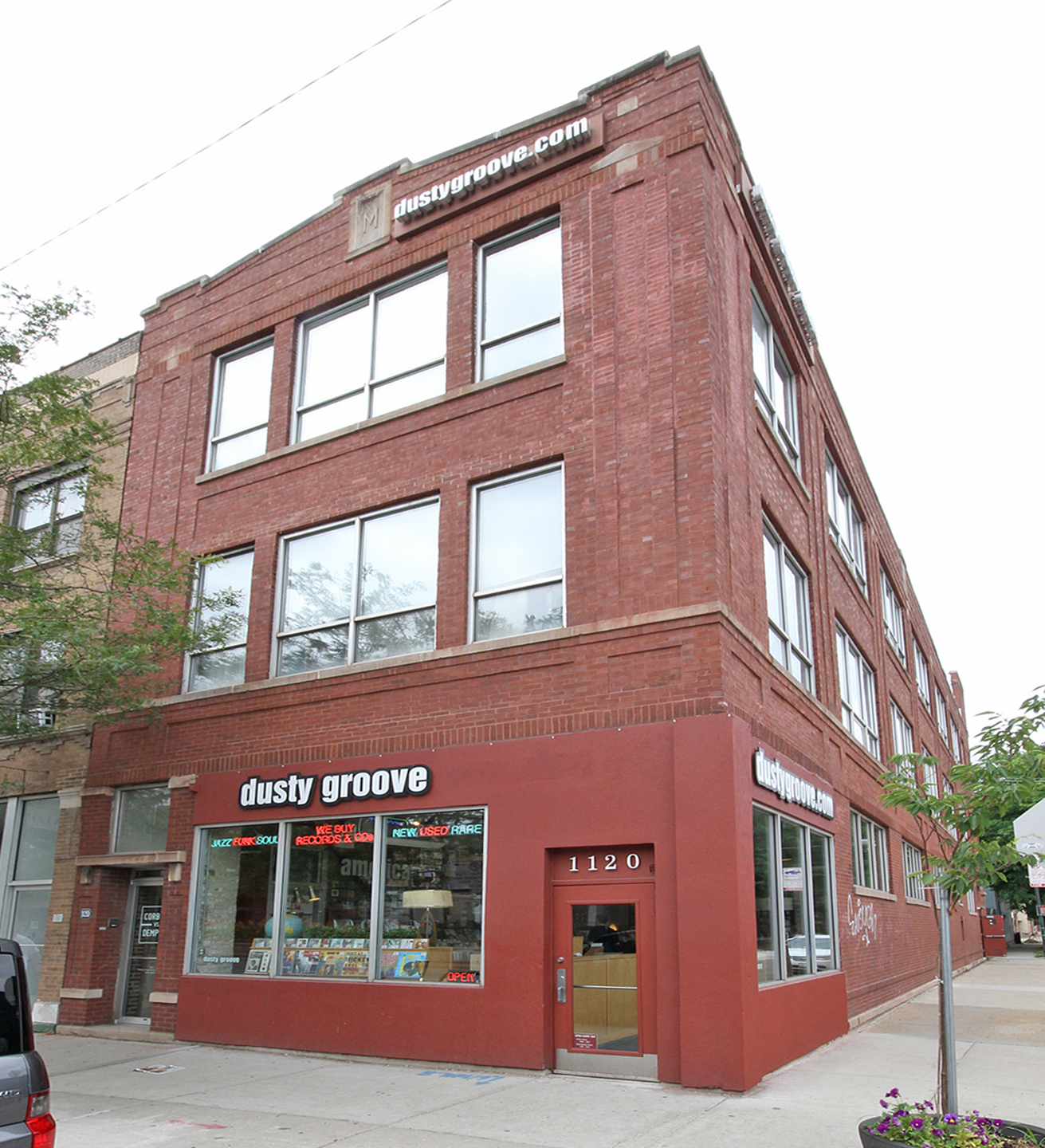
Dusty Groove building at 1120 N Ashland Avenue.

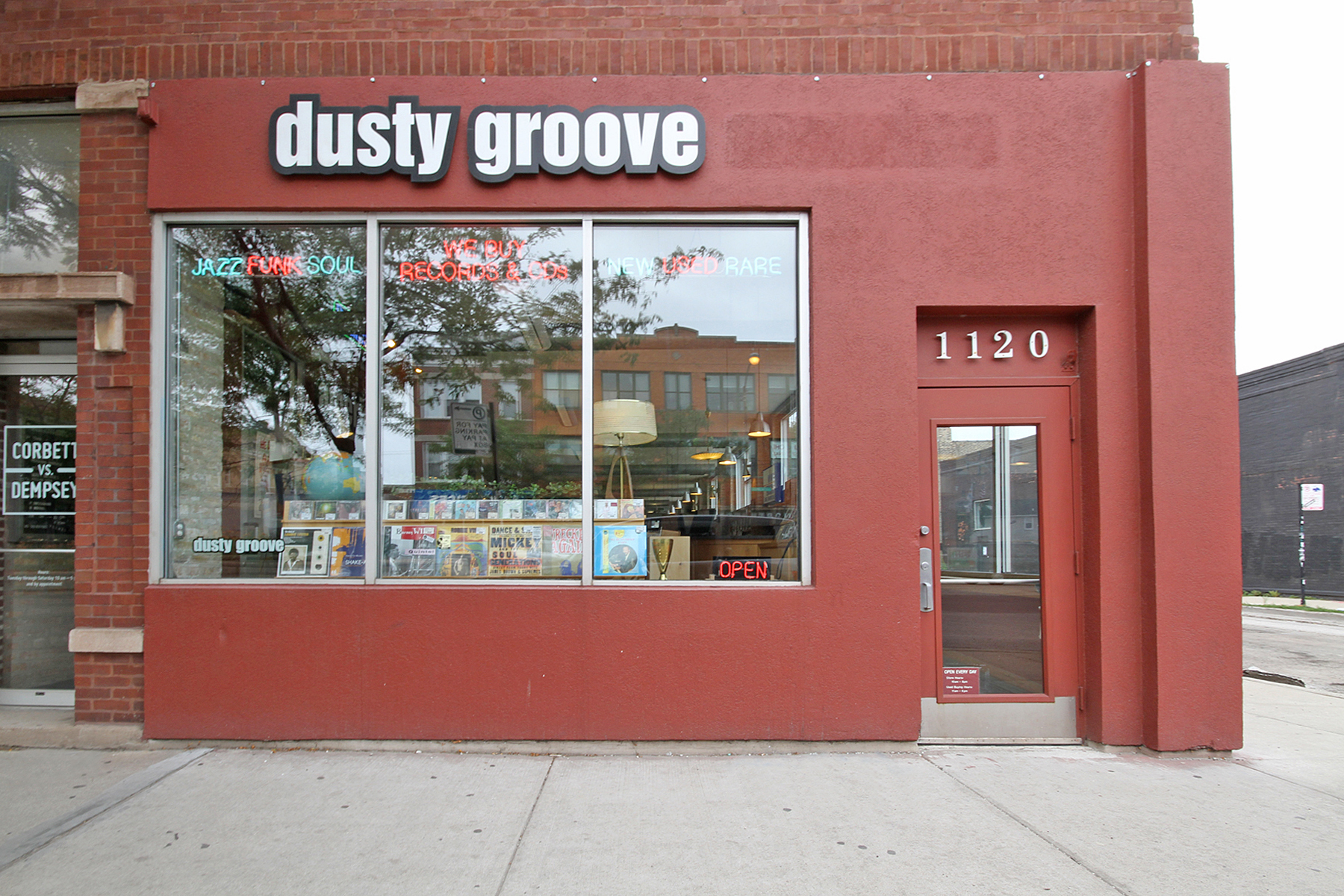
Front entrance to the Dusty Groove Chicago store.

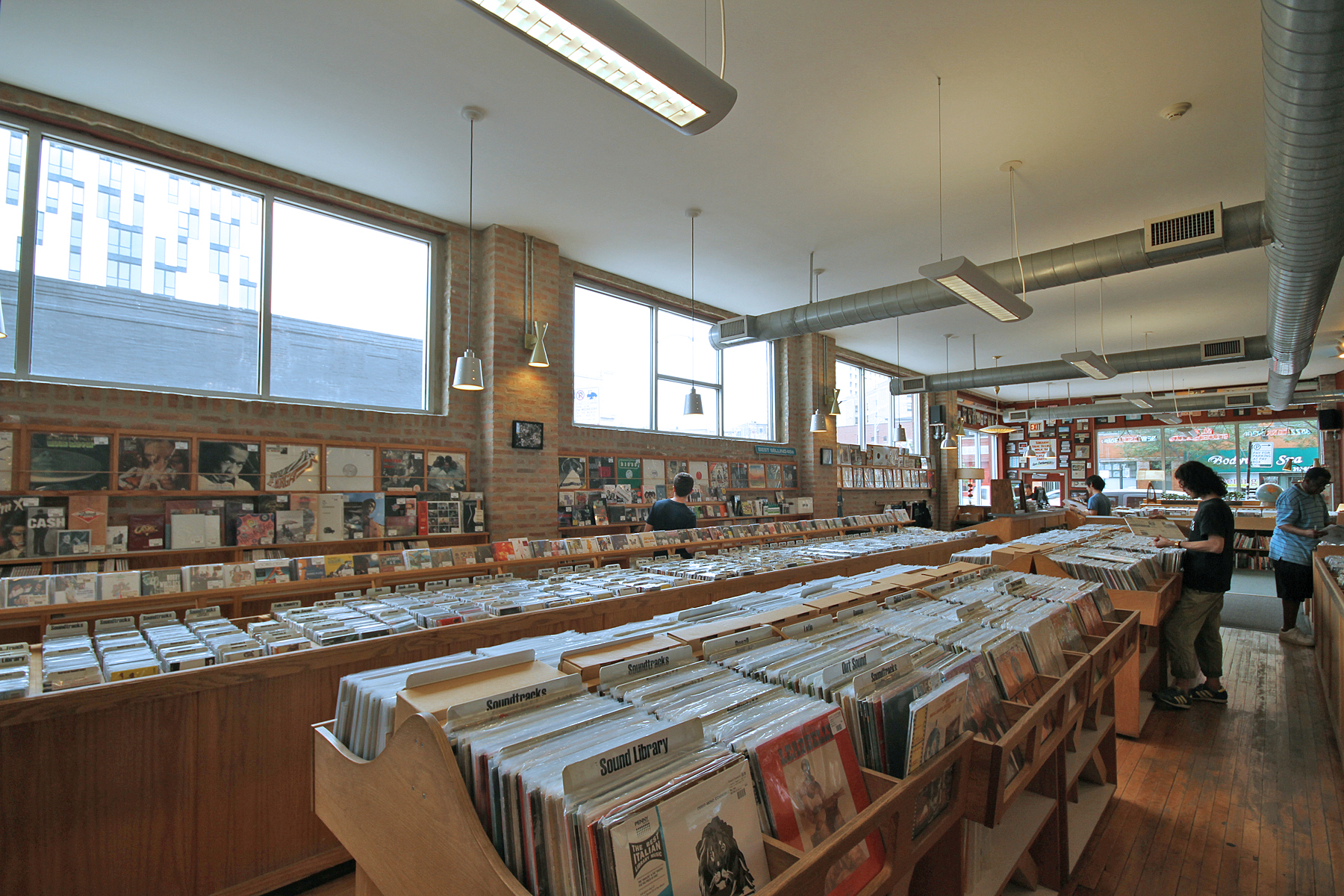
Interior of Dusty Groove on an early weekday.

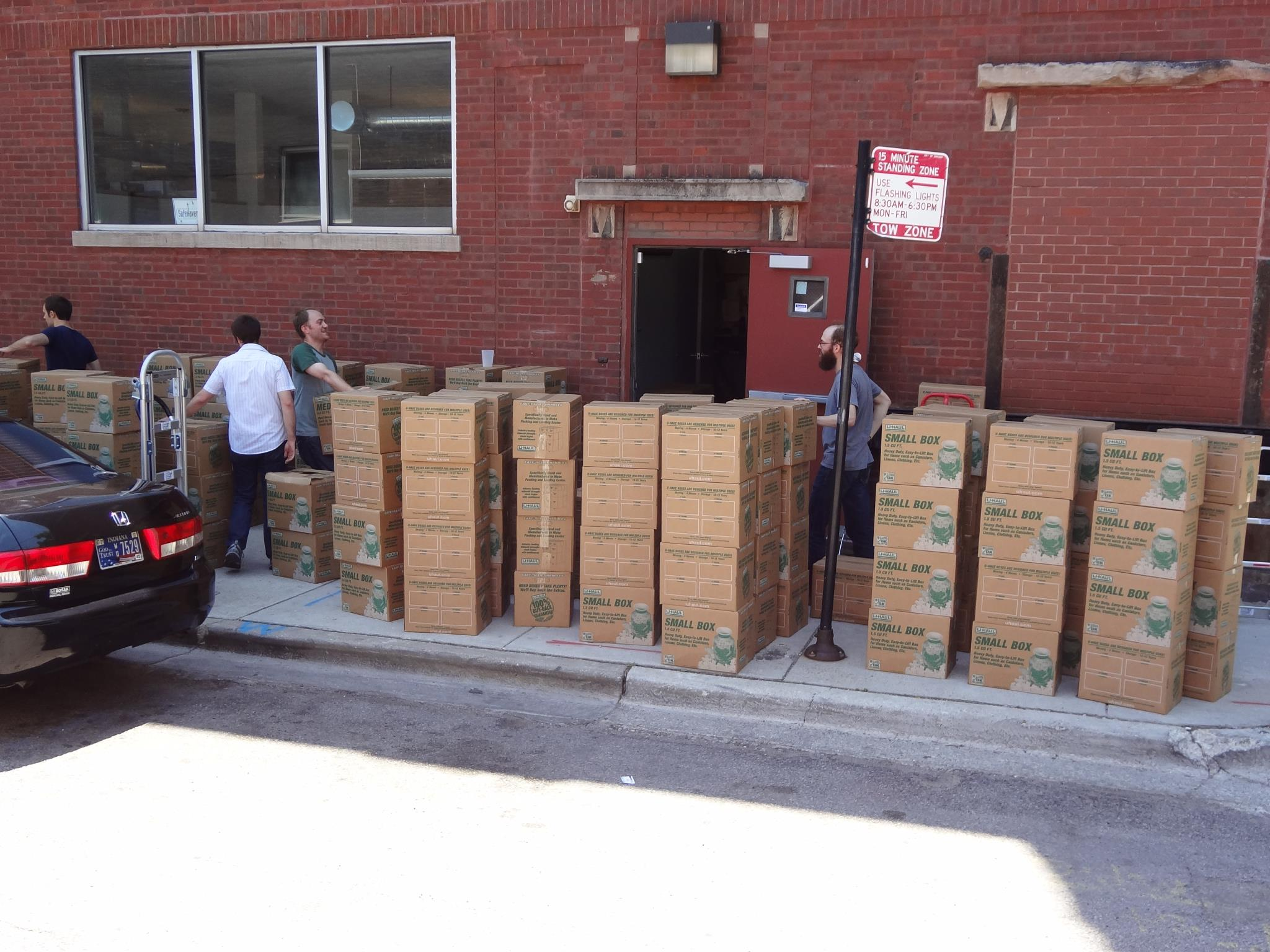
Unloading boxes of records, CDs, 45s, and 78s following the acquisition of WGN Chicago radio station's music library.

== History ==
=== Online record store ===
Founded in 1996 by University of Chicago alumni Rick Wojcik and JP Schauer as an online-only record store, the website dustygroove.com soon attracted the interest of global record collectors. The site has been featured in publications such as The New York Times, Rolling Stone, Billboard, The Wire, Spin, GQ, Esquire, and Vibe.

=== Retail operations ===
Dusty Groove operated its mail-based shipping business an office in the Hyde Park neighborhood of Chicago before moving to a loft in Wicker Park in 1997, adding a brick-and-mortar retail storefront with weekend hours. The store opened for business daily 2001, expanding to a nearby location where it remains. Dusty Groove maintains an extensive warehouse and retail presence with up to 30,000 items in inventory at any given time and several hundred new titles added on a daily basis. Hundreds of orders are shipped every week day from its Wicker Park location to customers around the world, and the store maintains a prominent local presence in Chicago.

=== Record label ===
The "Dusty Groove America" record label was started in 2007, to license rare funk, soul, Latin, jazz, and Brazilian titles from Universal and Sony Music. This permitted the store to produce and distribute reissues or rereleases of almost two dozen CDs, most of which are now rare and long out of print. The label opened their reissue series with the release of Brazilian musician Jorge Ben's 1970 album Fôrça Bruta. The label continued as a partnership with Real Gone Music in 2012.

The store itself was branded as Dusty Groove America until 2012, when it shortened its name to reflect its growing international customer base and to emphasize the parent corporation's official trademark. Coincidentally, the phrase dusty groove has also appeared in the titles of songs by artists as diverse as Kelly Hogan, the New Mastersounds, Mushroom, and Don Caballero.

== Recent activities ==
=== Large acquisitions ===
Dusty Groove is known for procuring large music collections from individuals, organizations, and other record stores. Buyers regularly travel throughout the US and internationally to purchase music. In 2012, the store acquired Chicago-based radio station WGN's vinyl record collection which included upwards of 40,000 titles dating to the 1950s. On numerous occasions the store has bought collections from different institutions and private collectors with units numbering in the several thousands.

=== Special events and open-air markets ===
Dusty Groove participates in Record Store Day annually, and has been featured at the Renegade Craft Fair and other open-air markets and street festivals in the Chicago area. It has sold collectible music at several pop-up locations, usually in neighborhoods where few retail music outlets are established.

In 2016, the store celebrated its twentieth anniversary with a block party.

=== Website revisions ===
In 2013, a website revision was initiated to allow fine-grain search and inspection of product inventory based on genre, format, price, release decade, new vs. used status, and label (in addition to artist name and title). This simulates a virtual "crate digging" experience for dedicated audiophiles and casual record and CD buyers alike. Newly added products are grouped by genre to permit regular customers to quickly scan inventory changes, mirroring a "new arrivals" bin often found in a typical used record store. Dusty Groove's staff writes all product descriptions and scans all album and CD covers, providing a unique combination of written and visual information that is generally unavailable from other retailers or online music catalogs.

== Awards and recognition ==
The business is consistently regarded as one of the best record stores in Chicago by critics and customers alike. In 2010 it was recognized as one of the Best Record Stores in the US by Rolling Stone, and in 2011 by Time, The Wall Street Journal, and Reader's Digest. The store has been cited as being among the leaders in the revival of vinyl record sales.

In 2019, a feature-length documentary about the store and its relationship with the Chicago music community was released.

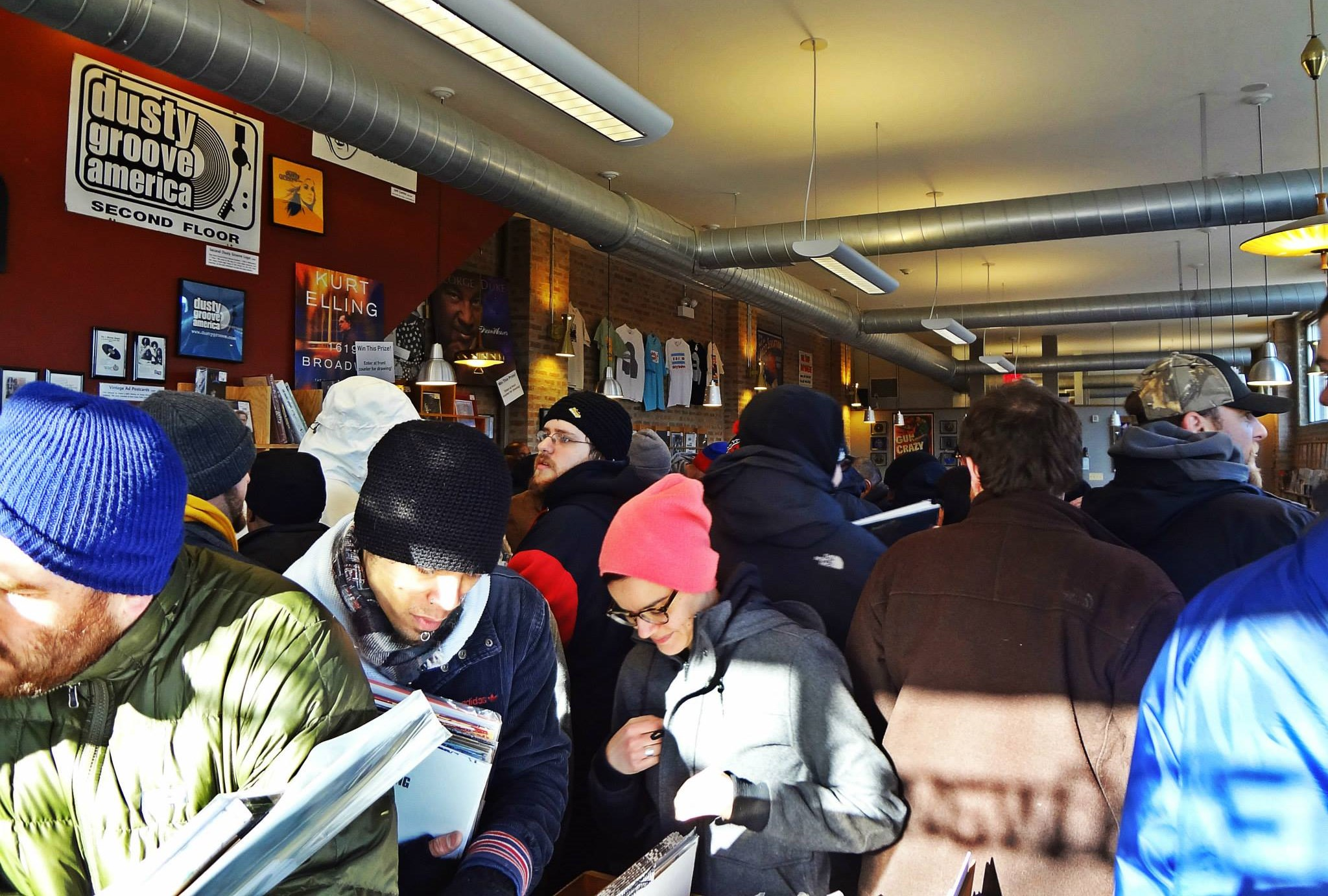
Record Store Day 2014 at Dusty Groove.

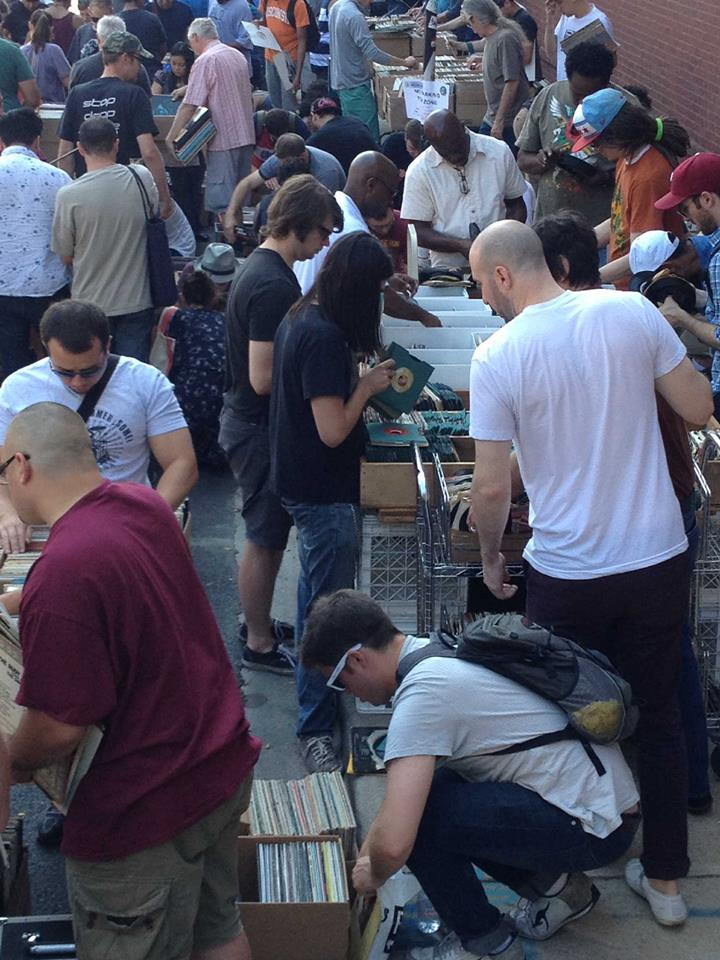
Customers outside the Dusty Groove building during a sidewalk sale.

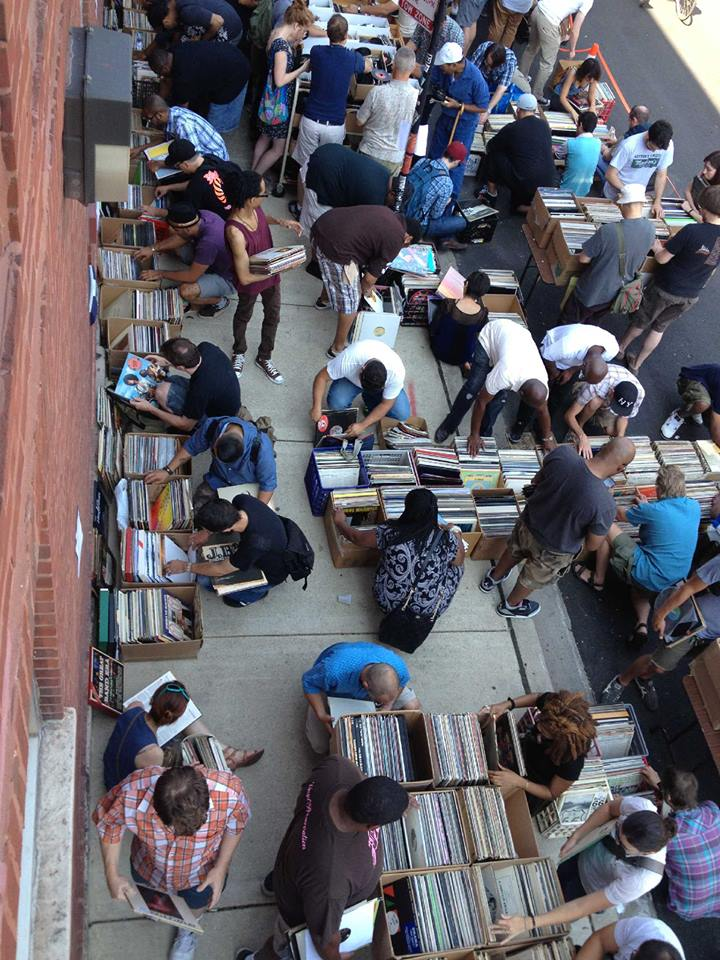
Customers outside the Dusty Groove building during a sidewalk sale.

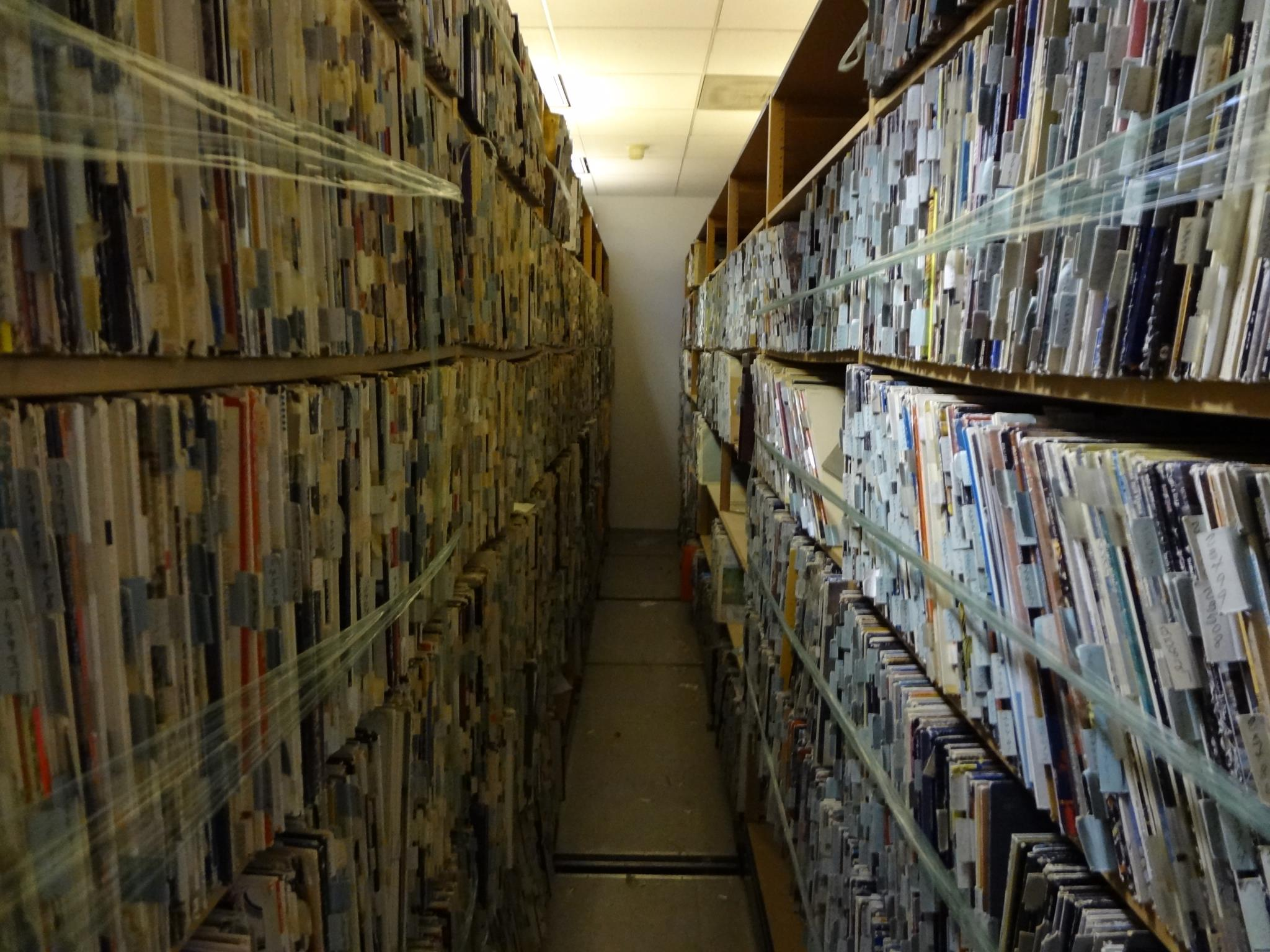
Shelves of vinyl records about to be inspected as part of the WGN Chicago music library acquisition.

== Discography ==
Albums reissued on CD under the Dusty Groove label include:

- Badfoot Brown & the Bunions Bradford Funeral & Marching Band
- The Dells Sing Dionne Warwicke's Greatest Hits
- Força Bruta
- Gal (1969 album)
- Gal Costa
- Gin and Orange
- Jorge Ben
- Jungle Fever
- The Rubaiyat of Dorothy Ashby
- Seasons – Pete Jolly
- Seriously Deep

== See also ==
- Avant-garde jazz
- High fidelity
- High-end audio
- Independent music
- Online music store
- Rare groove
- Record collecting
- WBEZ (Dusty Groove sponsors the program Radio-M)
- WHPK (University of Chicago station where Dusty Groove's founders used to DJ)
