= Araçá Azul =

Studio album by Caetano Veloso
- Released: November 1972; January 1973 (wide release)
- Venue: São Paulo, Brazil
- Studio: Eldorado
- Genre: Experimental; avant-garde folk
- Length: 38:55
- Label: PolyGram; Philips
- Producer: Caetano Veloso

Caetano Veloso chronology
| Caetano e Chico - juntos e ao vivo (1972) | Araçá Azul (1973) | Temporada de Verão - ao vivo na Bahia (1974) |

Araçá Azul (Portuguese for "blue Cattley guava") is the fifth studio album by Caetano Veloso, released in November 1972 by Philips Records. The album was recorded shortly after Veloso returned from his exile in London. Araçá Azul is Veloso's most experimental album to date, influenced in part by the poetics of invention of the Brazilian concrete poetry movement and the experiences in popular music by Walter Franco. It was negatively received by the market upon its release, and is Veloso's lowest-selling album despite receiving critical acclaim.

== Background ==
After an exile of 2 years in London, Veloso recorded Araçá Azul in São Paulo over a single week at Eldorado Studio, the only studio in Brazil equipped with 8-channel recording technology at that time. Veloso reports that he made the record alone, with help from a technician and his assistant, under permission of then president of PolyGram, André Midani. He used experimental techniques to record the album, recording "Épico" in an avenue in São Paulo.

== Music ==
The album is characterized as experimental and avant-garde folk. It also draws influences from samba and psychedelic rock. It is influenced by Walter Franco.

== Artwork ==
The cover art is a photograph of Veloso, taken by photographer and director Ivan Cardoso, and produced by Luciano Figueiredo and Oscar Ramos.

== Release and reception ==
As registered in the first print of the LP, and confirmed by the artist himself and the record company, the album was released in November 1972 and broadly commercialized after January 1973. It was badly received by the general public, adding a mark as the most returned LP from that period.

=== Critical reception ===
Professional ratings
Review scores
| Source | Rating |
|---|---|
| AllMusic | 3/5 stars |

Upon release, Araçá Azul was acclaimed by critics. Antônio do Amaral Rocha of Rolling Stone Brazil placed the album at number 97 in the list of the 100 best Brazilian albums. John Bohannon of PopMatters compared the album to Jean-Luc Godard's film Breathless, stating that both "were made at critical turning points in the histories of their mediums, and both stand as testaments to the innovative approaches of their creators."

Philip Jandovský of AllMusic gave it a less positive review, as he felt the album was too experimental and relying too much on sound effects, but said it was a good record "for a fan of experimental music or for someone in the right mood".

== Track listing ==
Side one
| No. | Title | Length |
|---|---|---|
| 1. | "Viola, Meu Bem" (traditional) | 0:49 |
| 2. | "De Conversa/Cravo e Canela" (Caetano Veloso, Milton Nascimento, Ronaldo Bastos) | 5:44 |
| 3. | "Tu Me Acostumbraste" (Frank Domínguez) | 2:58 |
| 4. | "Gilberto Misterioso" (Veloso, Sousândrade) | 4:50 |
| 5. | "De Palavra em Palavra" (Veloso) | 1:20 |
| 6. | "De Cara/Eu Quero Essa Mulher" (Veloso, Monsueto, Lanny Gordin, José Batista) | 4:14 |

Side two
| No. | Title | Length |
|---|---|---|
| 7. | "Sugar Cane Fields Forever" (Veloso, Sousândrade) | 10:15 |
| 8. | "Júlia/Moreno" (Veloso) | 3:19 |
| 9. | "Épico" (Veloso) | 4:06 |
| 10. | "Araçá Azul" (Veloso) | 1:20 |

=== Notes ===
Adapted from Discogs.

- "De Conversa/Cravo e Canela" is listed as "Cravo e Canela" in the inner sleeve.
- "Gilberto Misterioso" is listed as "Gil Misterioso" in the inner sleeve.
- "De Cara/Quero Essa Mulher" is listed as "Quero Essa Mulher Assim Mesmo" in the inner sleeve.
- "Araçá Azul" is listed as "Araçá Blue" in the inner sleeve.

== Personnel ==
Adapted from Discogs.

- Antonio Perna — piano (track 7)
- Caetano Veloso — producing
- Edith de Oliveira — vocals (tracks 1, 7)
- Ivan Cardoso — photograph
- Lanny — guitar (track 6)
- Luciano Oliveira — pandeiro (tracks 1, 7)
- Luciano Figueiredo — artwork
- Marcus Vinicius — technician
- Moacyr Albuquerque — bass (tracks 6, 7, 8)
- Milton Nascimento — cowriting
- Oscar Ramos — artwork
- Ronaldo Bastos — cowriting
- Rogério Duprat — arranging
- Tusé de Abreu — flute (track 7)
- Tuti Moreno — percussion, drums, vibraphone (tracks 4, 6, 7, 8)
