= Torquato Neto =

Brazilian poet, journalist and songwriter

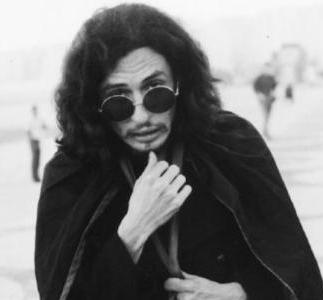
- Neto as Nosferatu during the shooting of the 1970 film Nosferatu no Brasil
- Born: Torquato Pereira de Araújo Neto; 9 November 1944; Teresina, Piauí, Brazil
- Died: 10 November 1972 (aged 28); Rio de Janeiro, Guanabara, Brazil
- Occupations: Poet, journalist, songwriter

Torquato Pereira de Araújo Neto (November 9, 1944 – November 10, 1972) was a Brazilian journalist, poet and songwriter. He is perhaps best known as a lyricist for the Tropicália counterculture movement, which later expanded its influence to Música popular brasileira. He worked with Gal Costa, Gilberto Gil, Edu Lobo and Waly Salomão. He died by suicide at the age of 28.

Neto was the son of a public prosecutor and a primary schoolteacher from Teresina, the capital of the northeastern Brazilian state of Piauí. At the age of 16, he moved to Salvador, Bahia, to attend secondary school at the Colégio Nossa Senhora da Vitória, where he was a classmate of Gilberto Gil. While there, he also worked as an assistant on Glauber Rocha's first feature film, Barravento.

Neto became actively involved in the cultural scene in Salvador, where he met Caetano Veloso, Gal Costa, and Maria Bethânia. In 1962, he moved to Rio de Janeiro to study journalism at university but never graduated. He wrote columns on culture for several publications there. Torquato acted as a cultural agent and polemical defender of the artistic avant-garde, including Tropicalia, Cinema Marginal, and Concretism. He was friends with several major figures of these movements, including the musicians mentioned above, the poets Décio Pignatari and Augusto and Haroldo de Campos, filmmaker Ivan Cardoso, and artist Hélio Oiticica. At this time, Neto came to be seen as a figure in Tropicalism, having written the breviary "Tropicalismo para principiantes" ("Tropicalism for Beginners"), in which he argued for the necessity of creating a genuinely Brazilian "pop": "Accept completely all that the life of the tropics can give, without preconceptions of aesthetic order, without consideration of tackiness or bad taste, solely living the tropical and the new universe it contains, still unknown." Neto was also an important lyricist of iconic songs of the tropicalist movement.

At the end of the 1960s, after the exile of his friends Gil and Caetano under the military dictatorship, he traveled to Europe and the United States with his wife Ana Maria and lived in London for a brief period. On returning to Brazil in the early 1970s, Neto began to isolate himself, feeling alienated by both the military regime and the "ideological patrols" of the left. He went through a series of hospitalizations for alcoholism and broke several friendships. Neto died by suicide the day after his 28th birthday, in 1972.
