= Água Viva (album) =

Studio album by Gal Costa
- Released: 1978
- Studio: Phonogram Studios
- Genre: Latin, MPB
- Label: Philips
- Producer: Perinho Albuquerque, Leina Grillo (co-producer)

Gal Costa chronology
Caras e Bocas (1977)	Água Viva (1978)	Gal Tropical (1979)

Água Viva is an album by Brazilian singer Gal Costa, released in 1978. The album contains hits such as "Paula e Bebeto", which was included in the soundtrack of the Brazilian TV series, Malu Mulher.

== Track listing ==
1. "Olhos Verdes" (Vicente Paiva) – 3:12
2. "Folhetim" (Chico Buarque) – 3:30
3. "De Onde Vem O Baião" (Gilberto Gil) – 3:09
4. "O Bem Do Mar" (Dorival Caymmi) – 1:42
5. "Mãe" (Caetano Veloso) – 3:34
6. "Vida de Artista" (Sueli Costa, Abel Silva) – 3:25
7. "Paula E Bebeto" (Milton Nascimento, Caetano Veloso) – 2:07
8. "A Mulher" (Caetano Veloso) – 1:55
9. "Pois É" (Chico Buarque, Tom Jobim) – 1:49
10. "Qual É, Baiana?" (Caetano Veloso, Moacyr Albuquerque) – 2:58
11. "Cadê" (Ruy Guerra, Milton Nascimento) – 3:26
12. "O Gosto Do Amor" (Gonzaguinha) – 4:02

== Personnel ==
- Perinho Albuquerque – Producer
- Ary Carvalhaes and Paulinho Chocolate – Engineer
- Luigi Hoffer – Mixing
- Aldo Luiz – Layout Design
- Guilherme Pereira – Management
