= Waly Salomão =

Brazilian poet (1943–2003)

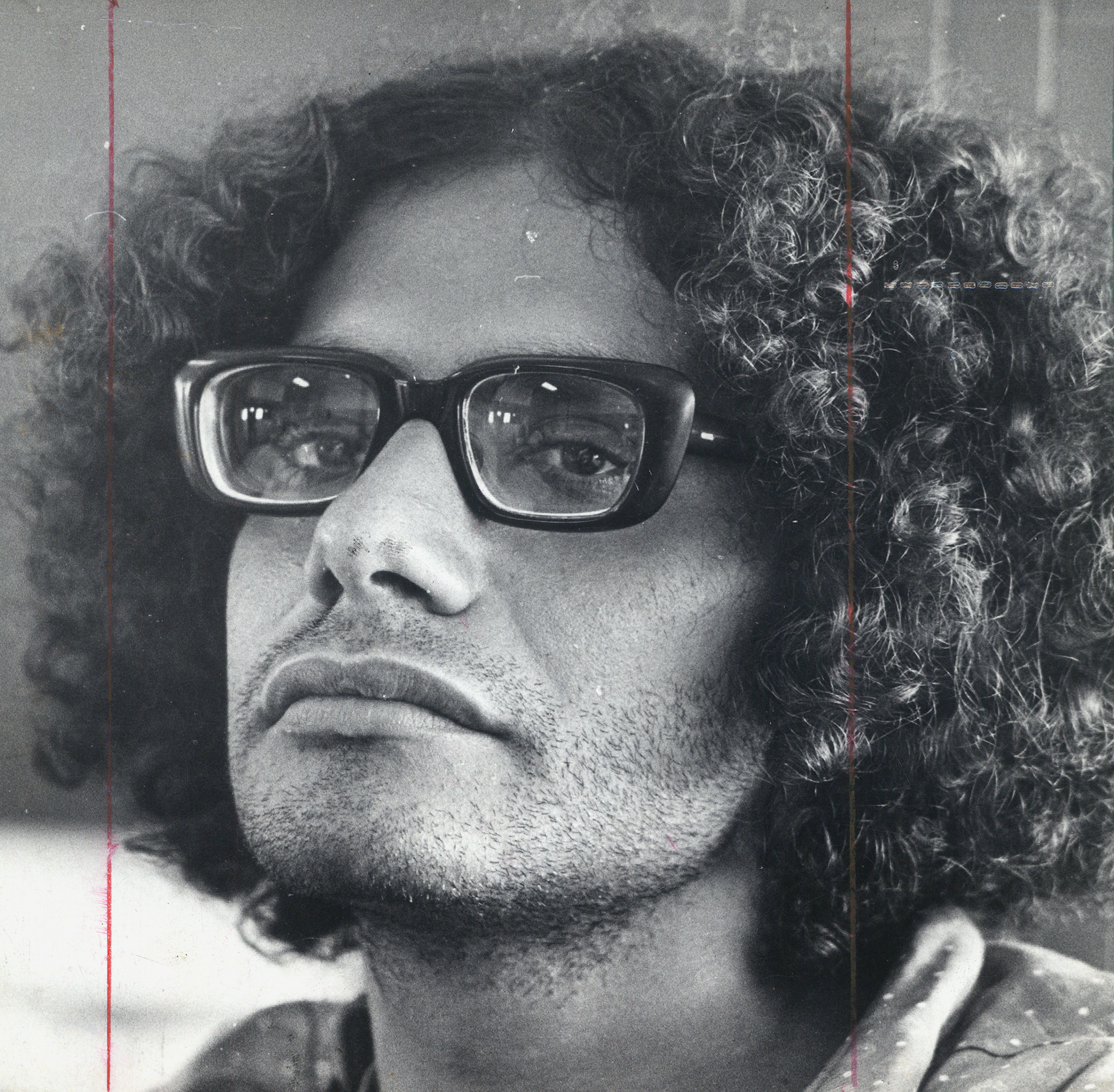
- Salomão in 1971
- Born: September 3, 1943 Jequié, Bahia, Brazil
- Died: May 5, 2003 (aged 59)
- Genre: Poetry

Waly Dias Salomão (September 3, 1943 – May 5, 2003) was a Brazilian poet. He was born in Jequié, Bahia, to a father of Syrian origin from Arwad, and a country mother. He acted on several areas of Brazilian culture as poet, songwriter and writer. His first book was Me segura qu’eu vou dar um troço in 1972. His last book, Pescados Vivos, was published in 2004 after his death. He wrote successful lyrics for Maria Bethânia, Gal Costa, Gilberto Gil and Caetano Veloso. Salomão died of cancer on 5 May 2003.
