= Jards Macalé =

Brazilian composer, singer and actor (1943–2025)

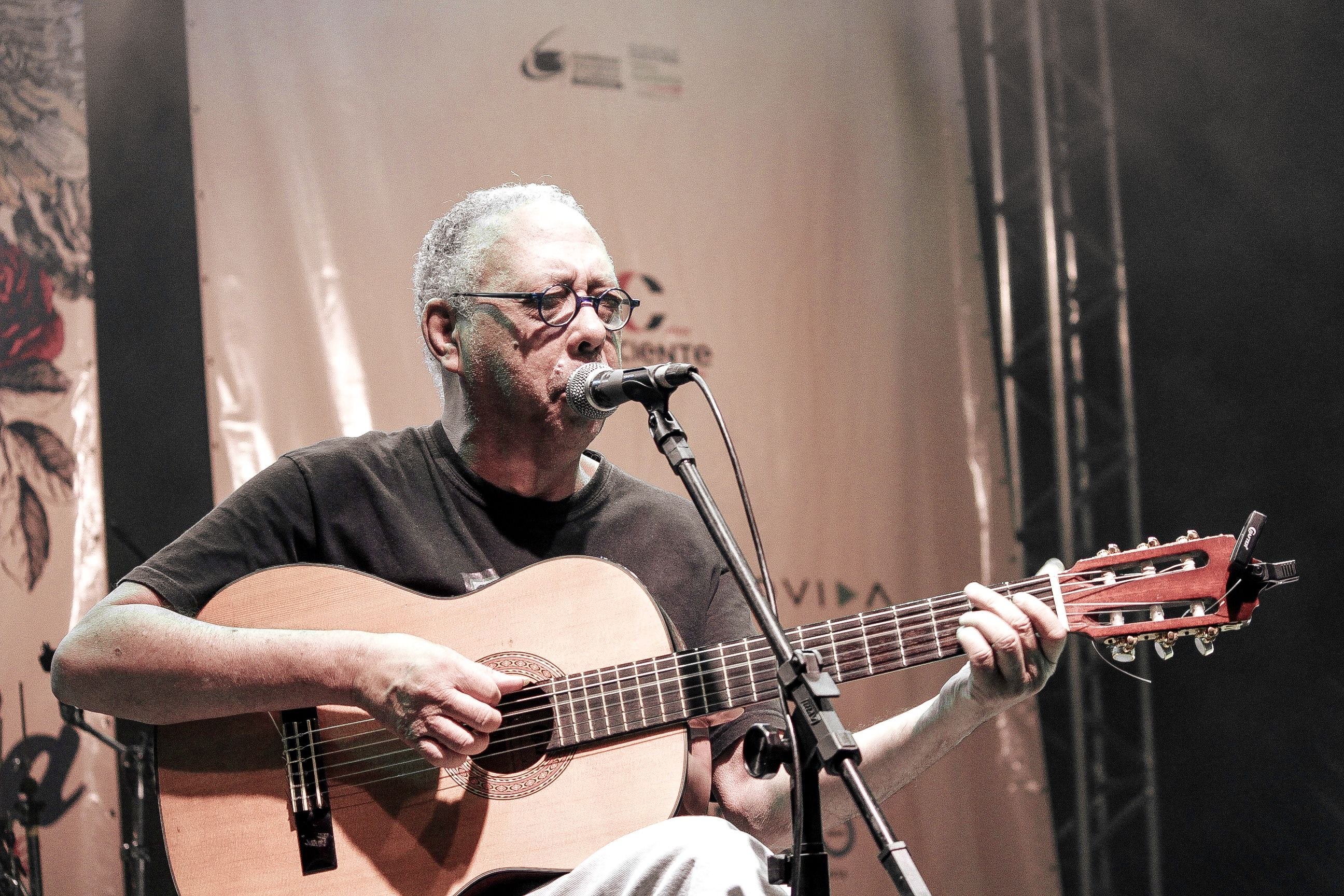
Macalé in 2012

Jards Anet da Silva (March 3, 1943 – November 17, 2025), known as Jards Macalé, was a Brazilian composer, singer and actor, known for his influential role in Brazil's tropicália movement in the 1960s.

== Life and career ==
Macalé was born in Rio de Janeiro, in the neighborhood of Tijuca, near Morro da Formiga, surrounded by music: on the hills, the drums; in the neighborhood, Vicente Celestino and Gilda de Abreu. At home, foxes, waltzes and folk songs played on the piano by his mother, Dona Ligia (who also sang), and the accordion by his father. The family choir had his younger brother, Roberto, and Jards. On the radio, Orlando Silva, Marlene, Emilinha Borba.

In 1969, Macalé participated in the 4th International Song Festival presenting the song "Gotham City".

Macalé participated as an actor and composer of the soundtrack of the films The Amulet of Ogum and Tent of Miracles, by Nelson Pereira dos Santos.

In 1976, Macalé became partner of Moreira da Silva on some sambas.

In 2013 he participated in Exile Songs event, which claimed to be an anarchist, and Tenda dos Milagres.

In 2019, his album Besta Fera was nominated for the Latin Grammy Award for Best MPB Album and considered one of the 25 best Brazilian albums of the first half of 2019 by the São Paulo Association of Art Critics (APCA). APCA also chose his album Coração Bifurcado as one of the 50 best Brazilian albums of 2023 and the collaboration Mascarada: Zé Kéti with Sergio Krakowski Trio as one of the 50 best albums of 2024.

Macalé died from a cardiac arrest on November 17, 2025, at the age of 82, after being hospitalized for treating lung problems.

== Discography ==
Contributing artist

- Unwired: Latin America (2001, World Music Network)
- Unwired: Besta Fera (2018, Pommelo)
