= Gal Costa =

Brazilian singer (1945–2022)

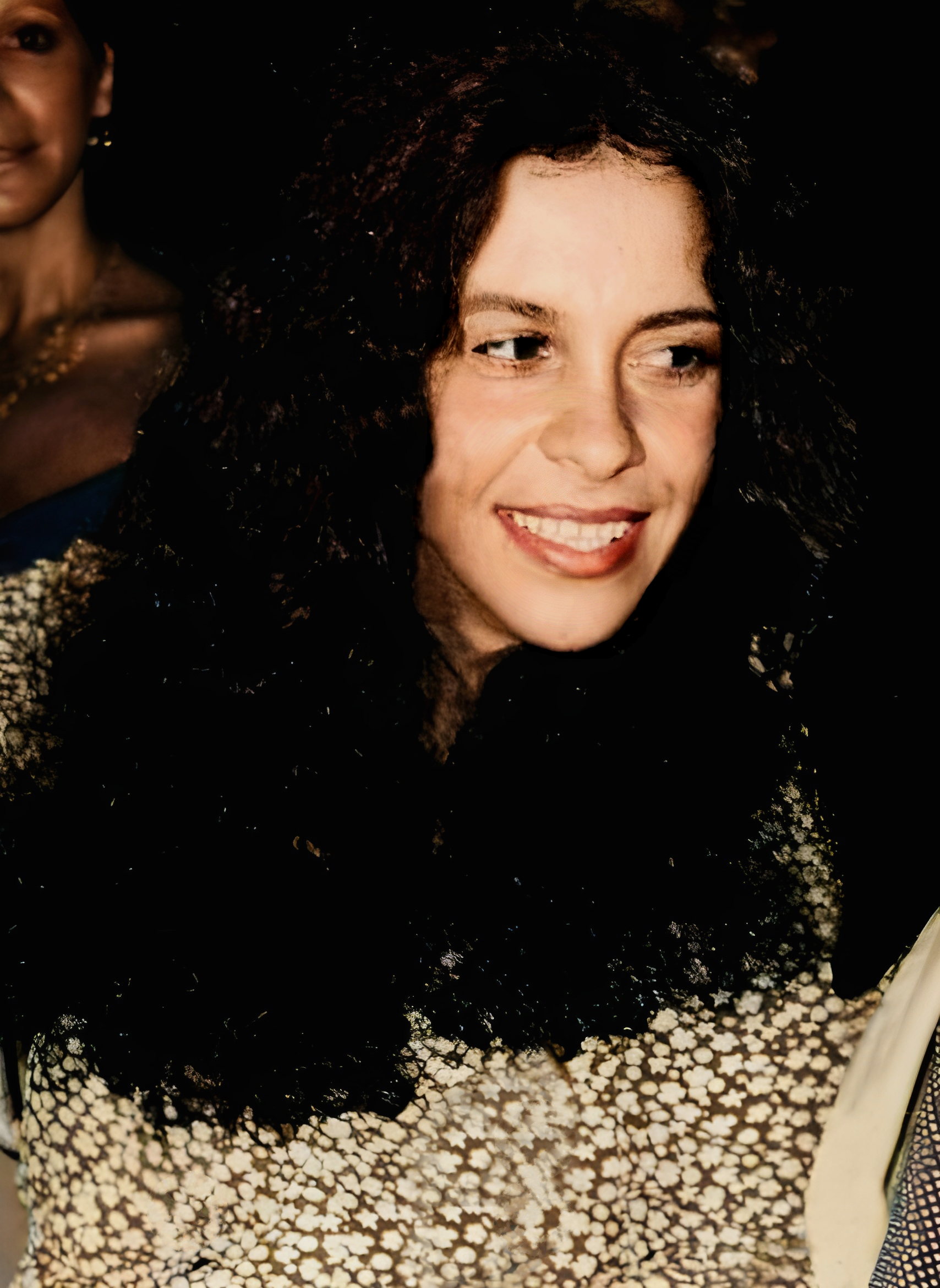
- Costa in the 1970s

Background information
- Born: Maria da Graça Costa Penna Burgos; 26 September 1945; Salvador, Bahia, Brazil
- Died: 9 November 2022 (aged 77) São Paulo, São Paulo, Brazil
- Genres: MPB, tropicália, psychedelia, rock, bossa nova, samba
- Occupation: Singer
- Years active: 1964–2022 (her death)
- Labels: RCA; Philips; PolyGram; Universal
- Website: galcosta.com.br

Gal Maria da Graça Costa Penna Burgos (born Maria da Graça Costa Penna Burgos; 26 September 1945 – 9 November 2022), known professionally as Gal Costa (Brazilian Portuguese pronunciation: [ˈgaw ˈkɔstɐ]), was a Brazilian singer of popular music. Twelve-time Brazilian Music Awards winner, she was one of the main figures of the tropicalia music scene in Brazil in the late 1960s and appeared on the acclaimed compilation Tropicália: ou Panis et Circencis (1968). She was described by The New York Times as "one of Brazil's greatest singers."

== Early life ==
Gal Costa was born Maria da Graça Costa Penna Burgos on 26 September 1945, in the city of Salvador, the capital of the state of Bahia, Brazil. Her mother, Mariah Costa Penna, separated from her father, Arnaldo Burgos, after discovering he had a second family in another city. Arnaldo Burgos died when Gal was 14 years old.

At the age of 10, Gal befriended sisters Sandra and Andréia Gadelha, the future spouses of singer-songwriters Gilberto Gil and Caetano Veloso, respectively. They gave her the nickname Gau, later spelled as Gal. At 14, she first listened to João Gilberto's "Chega de Saudade" on the radio and became interested in Bossa Nova. She then went on to work as a clerk in Salvador's main record store to get closer to music. At 18, she was introduced to Caetano Veloso by Andréia Gadelha, becoming close friends.

== Career ==
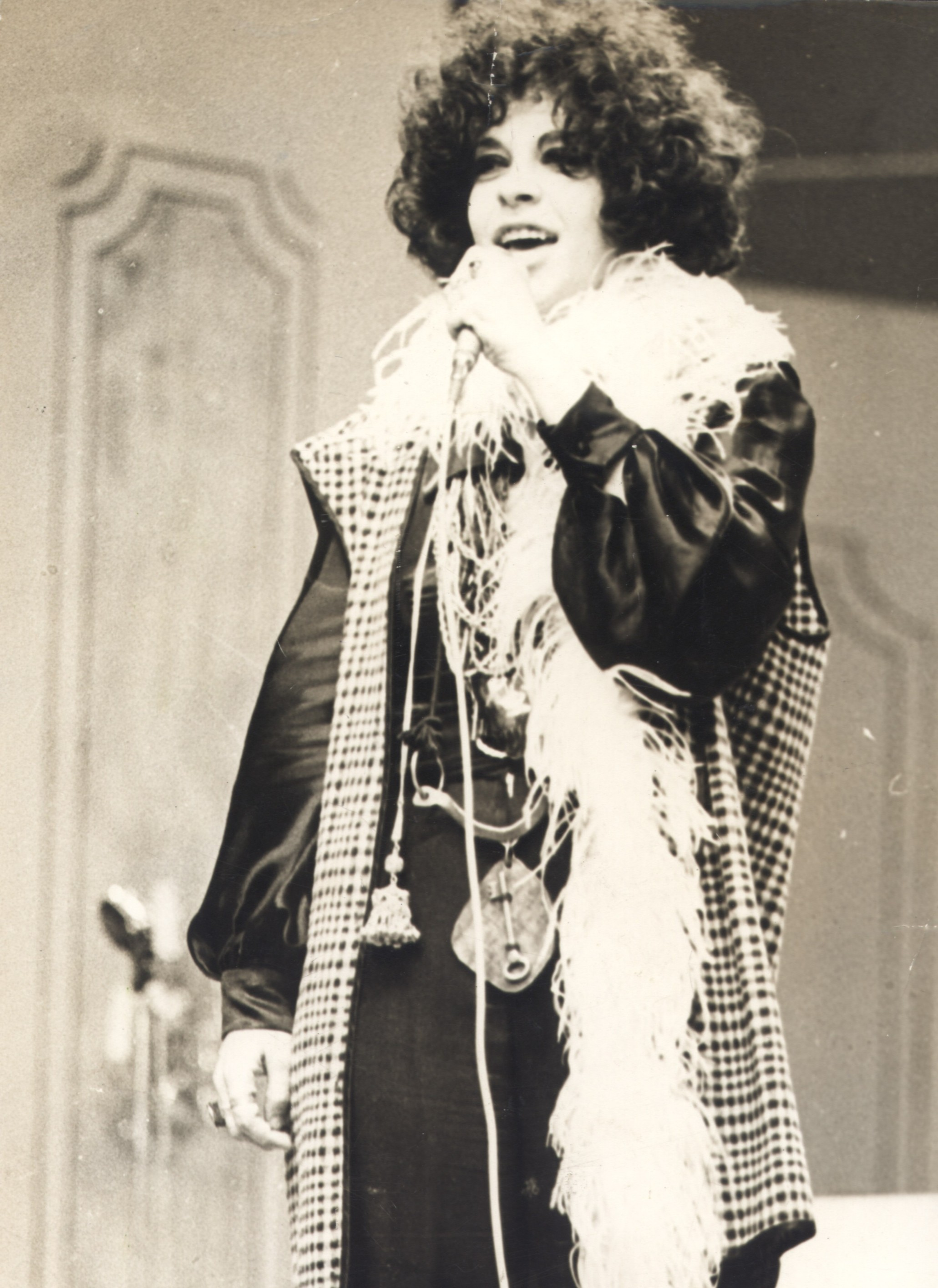
Gal Costa, 1969

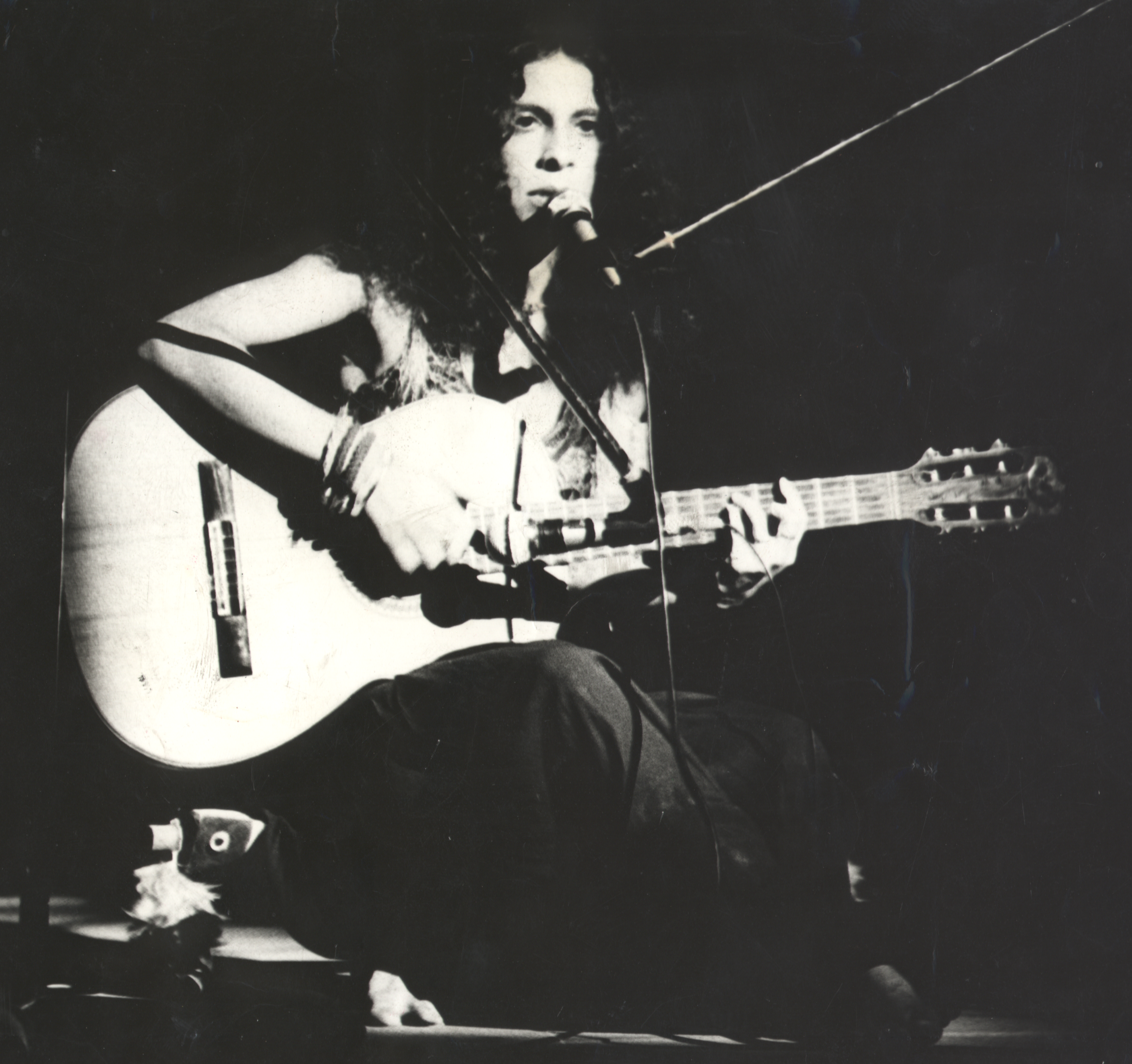
Gal Costa, 1971

While early in her career, she performed as Maria da Costa, producer Guilherme Araújo claimed she needed a stage name. He jokingly said "Gal: Guilherme Araújo Limited" and she agreed to use this respelling of her nickname. She would later change her name to incorporate "Gal" as well as put Costa as her final surname. Gal debuted her professional career on the night of 22 August 1964 at the concert Nós, por exemplo (We, For Example), where she performed alongside Veloso, Gil, Maria Bethânia and Tom Zé, among others. The concert inaugurated the Vila Velha Theatre in her hometown. During the same year, she also performed in Nova Bossa Velha, Velha Bossa Nova (New Old Wave, Old New Wave), at the same place and with the same singing partners. She then left Salvador to live in the house of her cousin Nívea in Rio de Janeiro, following in the footsteps of Bethânia, whose concert Opinião (Opinion) had become a huge hit there.

Gal's first professional recording happened on Bethânia's debut album, released in 1965. It was the duet "Sol Negro" (Black Sun) written by Bethânia's brother, Caetano Veloso. She then released her first singles through RCA Records, "Eu vim da Bahia", written by Gil, and "Sim, foi você", written by Veloso. The following year, Gal met Gilberto personally and participated in TV Rio's 1st International Music Festival, performing "Minha Senhora", written by Gil and Torquato Neto. It failed to captivate the Festival's audience.

Gal's first album Domingo was released in 1967 through Philips Records. It was also Veloso's debut. Gal stayed on the label, which later became PolyGram, until 1983. One song released from this album, "Coração Vagabundo", became a huge hit. The same year, Gal also performed two songs on the 2nd International Music Festival, which was then hosted by Rede Globo. They were "Bom Dia", written by Gil and Nana Caymmi, and "Dadá Maria", written by Renato Teixeira. The latter was performed with Sílvio César at the Festival and with Teixeira on the recording.

In 1965, Costa began to record unedited songs from Gilberto Gil and Caetano Veloso. In 1968, Gal became a part of the tropicália movement. Tropicalia is a mix of Samba, Bossa Nova and modern genres like rock and beat. She recorded four songs on Tropicália: ou Panis et Circenses. They were "Mamãe coragem", written by Veloso and Torquato Neto, "Parque industrial", by Tom Zé, "Enquanto seu lobo não vem", by Veloso, and "Baby", also by Veloso. The latter became one of Costas' best-known songs. The same year, she participated in the 3rd International Music Festival, performing "Gabriela Mais Bela", written by Roberto and Erasmo Carlos. In November, she participated in Rede Record's 4th Music Festival, performing the song "Divino Maravilhoso", by Gil and Veloso. The song also became a nationwide hit and a classic song of popular music. When Gilberto Gil and Caetano Veloso were living in exile in London, she would visit them and keep performing their music, but stayed in Brazil.

In 1969, Gal released her eponymous solo debut album, which included "Baby" and "Divino Maravilhoso". The album is considered a Tropicalismo classic, balanced between Brazilian stylizations and North American psychedelic influences. It also featured Gal's third and fourth solo hits, Jorge Ben Jor's "Que pena (Ele já não gosta mais de mim)" and Veloso's "Não identificado", respectively. In the same year, she recorded her second solo album, titled Gal, featuring the hits "Meu nome é Gal", by Roberto and Erasmo Carlos, and "Cinema Olympia", by Veloso. The album served as the basis for the repertoire of the concert Gal!

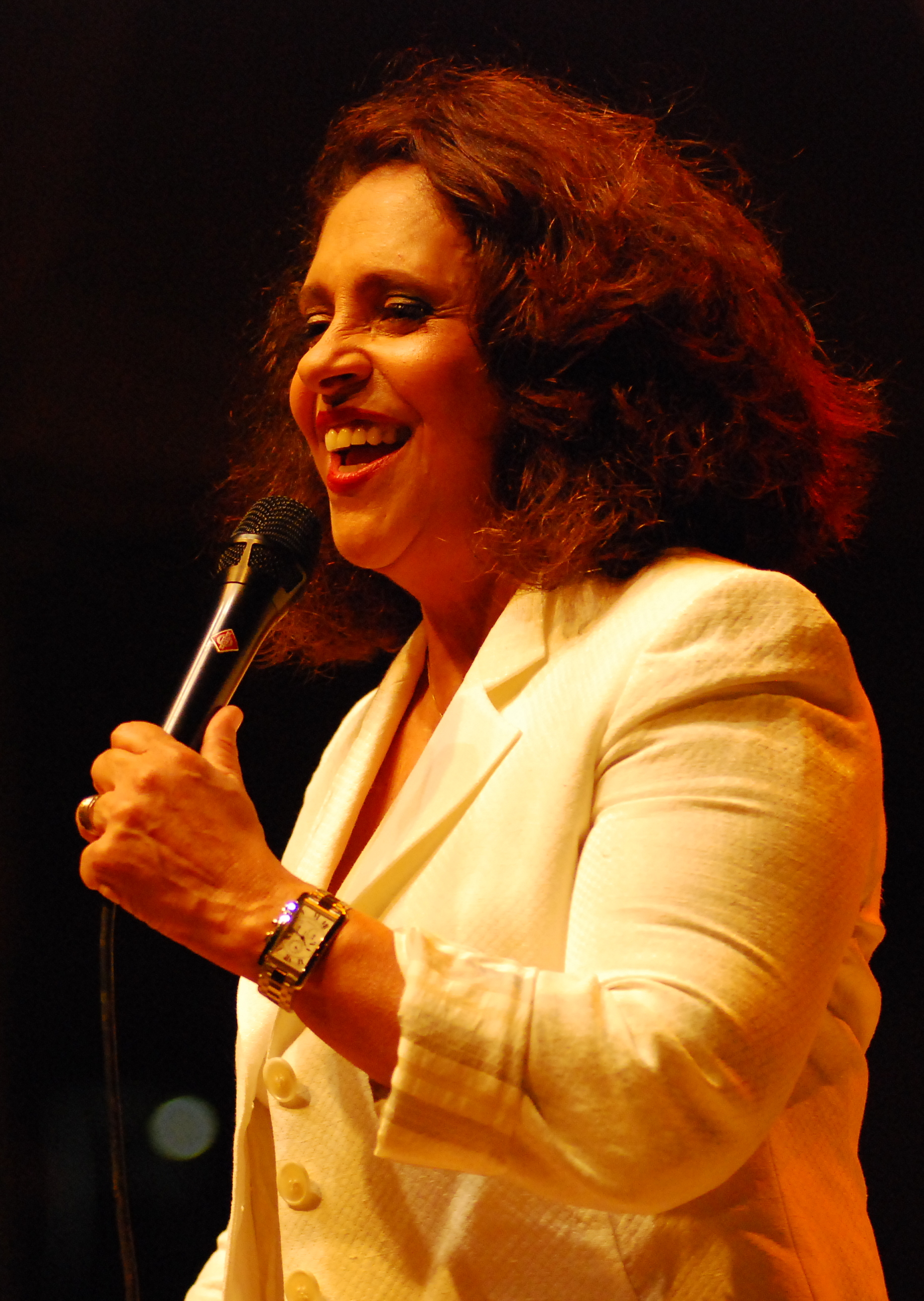
Costa in 2008

Her next album, Legal, was not as far from the mainstream as its predecessor, and a live album the following year again balanced smooth Brazilian sounds with heavy rock. In 1973, the cover of Costa's album Índia was censored — it focuses on her red bikini bottom. Gal has recorded songs composed by a number of Brazil's most popular songwriters such as Tom Jobim, Ben and Erasmo Carlos. In the 1970s, she was one of the members of the Doces Bárbaros, the others being Veloso, Gil and Maria Bethânia. For years, a reunion was hoped for this emblematic group in the Brazilian popular music. In 1982, the single "Festa Do Interior" from the double album Fantasia became her biggest ever hit, going multi-platinum by the end of the year. In 1994, Gal performed the song Brasil, topless. She recorded songs in Portuguese, Spanish and English.

Gal Costa is portrayed by Sophie Charlotte in the 2023 biographical film Meu nome é Gal.

== Awards ==
In 2011, Costa received the Latin Grammy Lifetime Achievement Award.

In 2023, Rolling Stone ranked Costa at number 90 on its list of the 200 Greatest Singers of All Time.

== Personal life ==
Gal was bisexual. She dated singer Marina Lima in the 1990s. She had one adopted son, Gabriel.

== Death ==
Gal died in São Paulo on 9 November 2022, at the age of 77. The cause of death was not shared; she had been recovering from an extraction of a nodule of her nasal cavity and had canceled her show at the Primavera Sound. A public viewing of her body was held at the Legislative Assembly of São Paulo on 11 November. Costa was interred in the Third Order of Carmel Cemetery in the district of Consolação of São Paulo. Multiple Brazilian celebrities paid tribute to her following her death including Maria Bethânia, Caetano Veloso, and Gilberto Gil. She was also honored posthumously at the 2022 Latin Grammy Awards.

== Discography ==
=== Studio albums ===
- 1965: Maria da Graça (EP)
- 1967: Domingo (with Caetano Veloso)
- 1969: Gal Costa
- 1969: Gal
- 1970: Legal
- 1971: -Fa-Tal- Gal a Todo Vapor
- 1973: Índia
- 1974: Cantar
- 1975: Gal Canta Caymmi
- 1977: Caras e Bocas
- 1978: Água Viva
- 1979: Gal Tropical
- 1980: Aquarela do Brasil
- 1981: Fantasia
- 1982: Minha Voz
- 1983: Baby Gal
- 1983: Gabriela movie soundtrack
- 1984: Profana
- 1985: Bem Bom
- 1987: Lua de Mel Como o Diabo Gosta
- 1990: Plural
- 1992: Gal
- 1994: O Sorriso do Gato de Alice
- 1995: Mina D'Água do Meu Canto
- 1996: Tieta of Agreste movie soundtrack
- 1998: Aquele Frevo Axé
- 2001: Gal de Tantos Amores
- 2002: Gal Bossa Tropical
- 2004: Todas as Coisas e Eu
- 2005: Hoje
- 2011: Recanto
- 2015: "Estratosférica"
- 2018: "A Pele do Futuro"
- 2021: "Nenhuma Dor"

=== Live albums ===
- 1971: -Fa-Tal- Gal a Todo Vapor
- 1976: Doces Bárbaros (with Caetano Veloso, Gilberto Gil, and Maria Bethânia)
- 1986: Jazzvisions: Rio Revisited (with Antonio Carlos Jobim)
- 1997: Acústico MTV
- 1999: Gal Costa Canta Tom Jobim Ao Vivo
- 2006: Gal Costa Live at the Blue Note
- 2006: Gal Costa Ao Vivo
- 2013: Recanto Ao Vivo

=== Singles ===
- 1968: "Baby"
- 1969: "Que Pena (Ela Já Não Gosta Mais De Mim)"
- 1970: "Meu Nome É Gal"
- 1970: "London, London"

== Selected filmography ==
Year	Film	Role	Notes
1995	O Mandarim		
2017	O Nome Dela é Gal		Biography docu-series produced by HBO Latin America

== Bibliography ==
- De Stefano, Gildo, Il popolo del samba, La vicenda e i protagonisti della storia della musica popolare brasiliana, Preface by Chico Buarque de Hollanda, Introduction by Gianni Minà, RAI-ERI, Rome 2005, ISBN 8839713484
- De Stefano, Gildo, Saudade Bossa Nova: musiche, contaminazioni e ritmi del Brasile, Preface by Chico Buarque, Introduction by Gianni Minà, Logisma Editore, Florence 2017, ISBN 978-88-97530-88-6
