= Caetano Veloso (disambiguation) =

Caetano Veloso (born 1942) is a composer, singer, guitarist, writer, and political activist.

Caetano Veloso may also refer to:

- Caetano Veloso (1968 album)
- Caetano Veloso (1969 album)
- Caetano Veloso (1971 album)
