= Transa (compilation album) =

Compilation album by various artists
- Released: November 22, 2024
- Studio: Gary's Electric
- Length: 230:53
- Label: Red Hot
- Producers: Massima Bell; Dust Reid

Red Hot chronology
Red Hot + Ra: Solar – Sun Ra in Brasil (A Tribute to Sun Ra: Volume 2) (2023)	Transa (2024)

Transa (stylized as TRAИƧA) is a compilation album, released by the Red Hot Organization on November 22, 2024. The album includes 46 songs and contributions from over a hundred musicians in "celebration of the trans community" and to bring awareness to trans rights.

== Background and recording ==
Transa continued the non-profit organization Red Hot's work in releasing compilation albums to promote ideals such as diversity and equal access to healthcare; the organization began with their 1990 compilation Red Hot + Blue, which raised money for AIDS research.

Transa was conceived in 2021 by producers Dust Reid and Massima Bell. The two met on a film set for a short project in which Bell spoke about her appreciation for nature. While on set, Reid played songs by "artists that I feel like gender-expansive people are really tuned into". Reid was already considering a project centering around trans and non-binary people, and the 2021 death of trans producer Sophie greatly inspired the project's development. Reid, who produced the 2014 Red Hot compilation Red Hot + Arthur Russell, likened Sophie's death to that of Russell's, stating that "I just thought that Sophie prematurely passing was like losing Arthur Russell all over again", and added "I feel like if [Russell] was alive today, he'd be producing for all the best artists". Reid and Bell then began seriously working on the project together. They conceived the album as an eight-part work, reflecting the eight stripes of the rainbow pride flag. Reid and Bell named the album Transa, after the 1972 album of the same name by Brazilian musician Caetano Veloso. In Brazilian Portuguese, transa is an informal term referring to sexual intercourse, though Reid and Bell redefined the term as a verb − "to love with no limitations on gender expression". Bell has expressed that the album is a "crucial act of 'archive-making'" for the trans community.

The two set to connect trans and nonbinary musicians invited to contribute to the album, with their musical inspirations. Transa was noted by Rolling Stone to be more diverse in its musical genres and gender identities than previous Red Hot compilations. When inviting artists to contribute, Reid and Bell asked if they would want to send in an original song or a cover. They invited British singer Sade, who they initially thought would be difficult to land a contribution from. Bell wrote a personal letter to Sade in March 2023, which was personally delivered to her by saxophonist Stuart Matthewman, who plays in the singer's band and who had previously recorded for Red Hot + Arthur Russell. Inspired by the narrative framework of Transa, Sade agreed to record "Young Lion" for the album. After reading rapper André 3000's name on a list of potential contributors, Sade asked if he had committed to the album yet. After letting him know about Sade's inquiry, André 3000 spoke with Reid on a Zoom call to learn more about the project. He then sent in a 26-minute-long composition for the album.

In July 2024, many of the album's contributors met at Gary's Electric, a Brooklyn recording studio, for a listening session of the album.

== Promotion and release ==
Red Hot Organization announced the album in September 2024. On September 28, a launch concert for the album was held in Manhattan's East Village. It was attended by around 450 people. The album was released on November 22, 2024.

On September 6, 2025, several songs from the albums were performed live at a day-long Transa event at the Getty Center. The event was hosted by David Longstreth of Dirty Projectors and featured performances by Teddy Geiger, Devendra Banhart, Ahya Simone, Cole Pulice, and Heart Shaped, among others. The event also featured films and art installations, as well as sound installation's in the venue's Central Garden.

== Track listing ==
Chapter I – Womb of the Soul
No.	Title	Writer(s)	Producer(s)	Length
1.	"Midnight Moon Pool" (Mary Lattimore, Laraaji, Mizu and Jamal Shakeri)	Eileen Myles; Jamal Shakeryan	Shakeryan; Dust Reid; Mark Yoshizumi	3:25
2.	"You Don't Know Me" (Devendra Banhart, Blake Mills and Beverly Glenn-Copeland)	Caetano Veloso; Elizabeth Glenn-Copeland	Mills	6:08
3.	"How Sweet I Roamed" (Jeff Tweedy and Claire Rousay)	Rousay; Ed Sanders; Tweedy; William Blake	Tweedy; Rousay	2:22
4.	"Same Train" (Heart Shaped and Christian Lee Hutson)	Hutson; Evan Murname; Evangeline Ada Lioryn; Veronika Jane	Hutson; Jane	4:33

Chapter II – Survival
No.	Title	Writer(s)	Producer(s)	Length
5.	"Star" (Ana Roxanne and Nsámbu Za Suékama)	Roxanne; Marsha P. Johnson	Roxanne	2:55
6.	"Please Tell Me" (Lightning Bug)	Ian Holshevnikoff	Lightning Bug	3:17
7.	"Make 'Em Laugh" (Benét and Faye Webster)	Benét Nutall; Webster	Carlos Truly	3:23
8.	"Get Me Away from Here, I'm Dying" (Julien Baker and Calvin Lauber featuring Soak and Quinn Christopherson)	Stuart Murdoch	Lauber; Baker	4:13
9.	"Rumblin'" (Soft Rōnin featuring Frankie Cosmos)	Veronica Zweiback		2:42
10.	"Deeper Understanding" (Hand Habits featuring Bill Callahan)	Callahan; Kate Bush; Meg Duffy	Gabe Wax; Duffy	3:59

Chapter III – Dark Night
No.	Title	Writer(s)	Producer(s)	Length
11.	"Under the Shadow of Another Moon" (Cole Pulice and Hunter Schafer)	Pulice; Myles	Pulice	4:05
12.	"Blush" (Lucy Liyou featuring Grouper)	Liz Harris; Liyou		6:02
13.	"Is It Cold in the Water?" (Moses Sumney featuring ANOHNI)	Caila Thompson-Hannant; Sophie Xeon	Aaron Liao; Sumney	3:55
14.	"Know Who You Are at Every Age" (Anajah and Gary Gunn)	Elizabeth Fraser; Robin Guthrie; Simon Raymonde	Gunn	4:09
15.	"Is It Over Now?" (Niecy Blues featuring Joy Guidry)	Blues		5:00

Chapter IV – Awakening
No.	Title	Writer(s)	Producer(s)	Length
16.	"Something Is Happening and I May Not Fully Understand But I'm Happy to Stand for the Understanding" (André 3000)	Andre Lauren Benjamin; Carlos Niño; Deantoni Parks; Diego Gaeta; Matthew David; Nate Mercereau; Shabaka; Veronica Camille Ratliff	André 3000; Niño	26:21
17.	"Come Back Different" (Nina Keith featuring Julie Byrne and Taryn Blake Miller)	Keith	Keith	4:06
18.	"Song to the Siren" (Rachika Nayar featuring Julianna Barwick and Cassandra Croft)	Tim Buckley	Nayar	6:00
19.	"Love Hymn" (Arthur Baker featuring Pharoah Sanders)	Baker	Baker	11:29
20.	"People Are Small / Rapture" (L'Rain featuring Voices from the NYC Trans Oral History Project)	Anohni Hegarty	Will Radin; Taja Cheek	9:14

Chapter V – Grief
No.	Title	Writer(s)	Producer(s)	Length
21.	"We've Been Through So Much" (Jlin and Moor Mother)	Camae Ayewa; Jerrilynn Patton	Jlin	4:23
22.	"My Name" (Kara Jackson, Ahya Simone and Dirty Projectors)	Simone; Dave Longstreth; Jackson	Longstreth	4:32
23.	"Point of Disgust" (Perfume Genius and Alan Sparhawk)	George Alan Sparhawk; Mimi Parker	Joseph Lorge	2:48
24.	"In Another Life" (Lomelda and More Eaze)	Sandro Perri		3:04
25.	"Pink Ponies" (Teddy Geiger and Yaeji)	Danny Parker; Kathy Yaeji Lee; Geiger		3:05
26.	"A Survivor's Guilt" (Yaya Bey)	Hidaiyah Bey		2:35

Chapter VI – Acceptance
No.	Title	Writer(s)	Producer(s)	Length
27.	"Just Last Night" (Helado Negro and Eileen Myles)	Myles; Roberto Carlos Lange	Lange	2:56
28.	"Feel So Different" (Ezra Furman and Sharon Van Etten)	Owen Pallett; Sinéad O'Connor		6:37
29.	"Mourning Dove" (Gia Margaret)	Margaret	Margaret	1:42
30.	"Feel Better" (Adrianne Lenker)	Lenker		4:23
31.	"Any Other Way" (Allison Russell and Ahya Simone)	William Bell		6:40
32.	"Down Where the Valleys Are Low" (Asher White, Eli Winter and Caroline Rose)	Judee Sill		4:58
33.	"TM" (Fleet Foxes, Cole Pulice and Lynn Avery)	Charles Lloyd		4:17
34.	"Querube" (AV María, Sky and Belina Rose)	AV María; Pedro Flores	Seba Otero	3:46

Chapter VII – Liberation
No.	Title	Writer(s)	Producer(s)	Length
35.	"Within Without" (Green-House and Kelela)	Michael Flanagan; Nsámbu Ze Suékama; Olive Ardizoni		5:20
36.	"Aaron" (Cassandra Jenkins, Bloomsday and Babehoven)	Ellen Kempner		3:27
37.	"Young Lion" (Sade Adu)	Aaron Taylor Dean; Ben Travers; Sade Adu	Dean; Adu	4:12
38.	"You Make Me Feel (Mighty Real)" (Moses Sumney, Lyra Pramuk and Sam Smith)	James Wirrick; Sylvester James Jr.	Sumney; Pramuk	5:27
39.	"I Feel Free" (Sparkle Division featuring Pepper MaShay)	Gary Thomas Wright; MaShay; William Basinski		3:43
40.	"Many Ways" (Clarity featuring Clairo)	Clarity Sushman	Wax; Pascal Stevenson	3:16

Chapter VIII – Reinvention
No.	Title	Writer(s)	Producer(s)	Length
41.	"Get Free" (Nico Georis and KB Brookins)	Brookins; Georis	Georis	6:14
42.	"Wolf Like Me" (Bartees Strange, Anjimile and Kara Jackson)	Strange; Graham Richman; Tunde Adebimpe	Strange	4:31
43.	"Surrender Your Gender" (Laura Jane Grace featuring Lee Ranaldo, Jayne County, Kathi Wilcox, Jay Dee Daugherty and Am Taylor)	County		3:47
44.	"I Would Die 4 U" (Lauren Auder and Wendy & Lisa of the Revolution)	Prince Rogers Nelson	Alex Parish	3:21
45.	"Always" (Time Wharp, Elizabeth and Beverly Glenn-Copeland)	E. Glenn-Copeland; Kaye Loggins		8:24
46.	"Ever New" (Sam Smith and Beverly Glenn-Copeland)	B. Glenn-Copeland	Rob Moose	5:44

== Charts ==
Chart performance for Transa
Chart (2024)	Peak position
UK Album Downloads (Official Charts)	47
