= Cores, Nomes =

Studio album by Caetano Veloso
- Released: 1982
- Recorded: December 1981
- Studio: Estudios PolyGram (Rio de Janeiro)
- Genre: MPB
- Length: 43:24
- Label: Philips
- Producer: Caetano Veloso

Caetano Veloso chronology
Brasil (1981)	Cores, Nomes (1982)	Uns (1983)

Cores, Nomes (transl. Colors, Names) is a 1982 album by Brazilian musician Caetano Veloso. It resembles his 1981 album Outras Palavras.

The tracks "Um canto de afoxé para o Bloco do Ilê" and "Queixa" appear on the 1989 David Byrne-compiled collection Beleza Tropical.

== Critical reception ==
Professional ratings
Review scores
Source	Rating
AllMusic	4/5 stars
The Rolling Stone Album Guide	4/5 stars
Spin Alternative Record Guide	8/10

The Spin Alternative Record Guide praised the Chic-meets-John Lennon swoon of 'Ele me deu um beijo na boca'."

== Track listing ==
All songs by Caetano Veloso, except where noted otherwise

1. "Queixa" – 4:26
2. "Ele me deu um beijo na boca" – 7:17
3. "Trem das cores" – 2:29
4. "Sete mil vezes" – 2:21
5. "Coqueiro de Itapoã" (Dorival Caymmi) – 2:37
6. "Um canto de afoxé para o Bloco do Ilê" (Caetano Veloso/Moreno Veloso) – 3:02
7. "Cavaleiro de Jorge" – 3:44
8. "Sina" (Djavan) – 4:21
9. "Meu bem, meu mal" – 4:03
10. "Gênesis" – 2:59
11. "Sonhos" (Peninha) – 3:01
12. "Surpresa" (João Donato/Caetano Veloso) – 3:20
