= Transa =

Transa may refer to:

- Transa (duo), a British electronic music duo
- Transa (Caetano Veloso album), a 1972 album
- Transa (compilation album), a 2024 album
