= Qualquer Coisa =

Studio album by Caetano Veloso
- Released: 1975
- Genres: MPB; folk music
- Length: 41:02
- Labels: PolyGram; Universal
- Producer: Caetano Veloso

Caetano Veloso chronology
Temporada de Verão – Ao Vivo na Bahia (1974)	Qualquer Coisa (1975)	Jóia (1975)

Professional ratings
Review scores
Source	Rating
AllMusic	4.5/5 stars

Qualquer Coisa (transl. Anything) is a 1975 studio album by Caetano Veloso. The album was released simultaneously with Jóia. The cover art, a collage of four pictures of Veloso, references the cover from the Beatles' Let It Be. The album features three covers of Beatles songs.

== Background ==
The release date of the album coincided with that of the previous album, Jóia, and the original LP catalog number was "6349 142."

The album cover is based on The Beatles' 1970 album Let It Be, and three of the tracks are covers of Beatles songs. The song "A Tua Presença Morena" is a self-cover of a track originally written for Maria Bethânia; her version appears on her 1971 album A Tua Presença.

Alvaro Neder of AllMusic gave the album 4.5 out of 5 stars, noting that it emphasizes Veloso's guitar, vocals, melodies, and lyrics.}

== Track listing ==
All tracks are written by Caetano Veloso, except where noted.

No.	Title	Length
1.	"Qualquer Coisa"	3:15
2.	"Da Maior Importância"	4:34
3.	"Samba e Amor" (Chico Buarque)	2:54
4.	"Madrugada e Amor" (José Messias)	3:39
5.	"A Tua Presença Morena"	2:05
6.	"Drume Negrinha (Drume Negrita)" (Eliseo Grenet, Caetano Veloso)	3:53
7.	"Jorge de Capadócia" (Jorge Ben)	3:21
8.	"Eleanor Rigby" (Lennon-McCartney)	5:33
9.	"For No One" (Lennon-McCartney)	5:02
10.	"Lady Madonna" (Lennon-McCartney)	2:49
11.	"La Flor de la Canela" (Chabuca Granda)	3:12
12.	"Nicinha"	0:46
