= Maria Bethânia: Music Is Perfume =

Maria Bethânia: Música é Perfume
- Promotional publicity poster
- Directed by: Georges Gachot
- Written by: Alan Bodian
- Produced by: Georges Gachot
- Starring: Maria Bethânia; Caetano Veloso; Gilberto Gil; Chico Buarque
- Cinematography: Matthias Kälin
- Edited by: Anja Bombelli; Ruth Schläpfer
- Distributed by: ArtMattan Productions
- Release date: August 24, 2005
- Running time: 82 minutes
- Country: Switzerland
- Language: Portuguese

Maria Bethânia: Music is Perfume (Portuguese: Maria Bethânia: Música é Perfume) is a 2005 documentary film by French-born, Switzerland-based director Georges Gachot that focuses on Brazilian singer Maria Bethânia. The film follows the star in the recording studio, the concert stage and in a visit to her 100-year-old mother in Bahia. The film also included appearances by Brazilian music stars including Caetano Veloso (Bethânia's brother), Gilberto Gil, Chico Buarque and Nana Caymmi.
