= Cê =

cê

Studio album by Caetano Veloso
- Released: 1 September 2006
- Genres: MPB, alternative rock
- Length: 49:14
- Labels: Mercury, Nonesuch
- Producers: Pedro Sá and Moreno Veloso

Caetano Veloso chronology
| Onqotô (2005) | cê (2006) | Cê ao vivo (2007) |

cê is a studio album by Brazilian singer, songwriter, and guitarist Caetano Veloso. Released on 1 September 2006 on Mercury Records, the album took its title from the colloquial Portuguese word meaning you. It was written with Veloso's band in mind, which was chosen in part by guitarist Pedro Sá. cê received positive critical commentary; several critics specifically noted the album's lyrical focus on human sexuality.

== Title and cover ==
The word cê is a shortened version of the Portuguese personal pronoun você, meaning you. Veloso says that cê is a more "colloquial" version of você, used often in everyday speech. When he writes lyrics, Veloso typically writes the word você, but sings cê when performing. The inspiration for the album's title came when he wrote cê instead of você and thought of it as an appropriate title.

Veloso designed the album's cover himself, as he had done before for three other albums. He went through a long design process in which the cover's colors, fonts, and text positioning were changed frequently. Veloso chose the color purple for the cover's background because it is mentioned multiple times in the album itself.

== Band and recording ==
Veloso wrote most of the album's material with its band in mind and played the music as a complete unit with the band. Guitarist and percussionist Pedro Sá had already been confirmed as a participant on the album, and he was invited to pick other musicians for it. cê's primary recording was completed in two weeks as a result of the extensive rehearsals conducted in the few months prior, and the extended recording process, including the production of rhythm tracks, extended for another six weeks.

When asked about the "tightness" of the album's sound by The Boston Globe's Siddhartha Mitter, Veloso responded that he had intended for the songs to be realized in this manner and that the young musicians he had hired to work on the album allowed him to do this.

== Lyrics and themes ==
cê's lyrical subject matter received attention from nearly every critic reviewing it, described as "carnal" by New York Times reviewer Nate Chinen. Brazilian music expert Dário Borim Jr. wrote, "Veloso's disc as a whole displays a plethora of poetic representations and pervasive preoccupation with sex and gloom." In particular, Borim noted the album's theme of unconventional sexual roles and Veloso's uncertainty of his sexual orientation.

Concerning the album, Caetano says that cê:

resulted from a mutation, from a desire to make a rock album without my name, and then make a samba album (Zii e Zie, released in 2009). I ended up not doing either one.

== Reception ==
Professional ratings
Aggregate scores
| Source | Rating |
|---|---|
| Metacritic | 75/100 |
Review scores
| Source | Rating |
| AllMusic | 3/5 stars |
| Folha de S.Paulo | 3/5 stars |
| Entertainment Weekly | B+ |
| Robert Christgau | (dud) |

cê received a rating of 75 out of 100 on the online review aggregator Metacritic, which corresponds with "generally favorable reviews", based on 12 reviews. Writing for The New Yorker, music journalist Sasha Frere-Jones described the album as closest to indie rock, compared to Veloso's previous records—"'cê' resists the anodyne charms of Brazilian pop, favoring loud, blocky rhythms more common to American garage bands." Frere-Jones went on to describe the fluidity of the album, falling very loosely into the rock music genre classification. Ben Ratliff, of The New York Times, noted that cê fell on the "petty end of the emotional spectrum" and that its compositions were raw and unpolished.

AllMusic's Philip Jandovský rated the album with three out of five stars. He wrote that cê, while not poor, lacked the creative spark that is Veloso's trademark. Conversely, Mallory O'Donnell of Stylus Magazine, who gave the album an A− rating, saw it as one of Veloso's better recent works, compared to 2004's A Foreign Sound, in particular. Village Voice critic Mike Powell also compared cê to A Foreign Sound and noted that cê's relative simplicity was its "triumph". cê was awarded the Latin Grammy for Best Singer-Songwriter Album.

== Track listing ==
All songs by Caetano Veloso.

1. Outro - 3:00
2. Minhas Lágrimas - 5:09
3. Rocks - 3:36
4. Deusa Urbana - 3:46
5. Waly Salomão - 3:24
6. Não Me Arrependo - 4:08
7. Musa Híbrida - 4:21
8. Odeio - 5:58
9. Homem - 4:46
10. Porquê? - 3:53
11. Um Sonho - 3:23
12. O Herói - 3:44

== Personnel ==
- Caetano Veloso – lead vocals, acoustic guitar; backing vocals on "Deusa Urbana"; choir on "Waly Salomão"
- Pedro Sá – guitars; choir on "Waly Salomão"; bass on "Não Me Arrependo" and "Porquê?"
- Ricardo Dias Gomes – bass, Fender Rhodes electric piano
- Marcello Callado – drums; backing vocals on "Outro"

== Charts ==
=== Weekly charts ===
| Chart (2006) | Peak position |
|---|---|
| Italian Albums (FIMI) | 60 |
| Portuguese Albums (AFP) | 5 |
