= O Leãozinho =

Portuguese-language song by Caetano Veloso

Song by Caetano Veloso

from the album Bicho
- Language: Portuguese
- Recorded: 1977

"O Leãozinho" (Portuguese pronunciation: [u liɐ̃wˈziɲu]) is a song composed by Brazilian singer/songwriter Caetano Veloso. The song title means "little lion" in Portuguese. It was recorded by Veloso himself in 1977 and published as the eighth track from his album Bicho (meaning "animal" or "bug" in Portuguese). English lyrics were added by Meja in her 2004 Mellow, however keeping the original title in Portuguese.

== History ==
The song is a tribute to the bassist of the band Novos Baianos, Dadi Carvalho. It was featured in the soundtrack of the soap opera Sem Lenço, sem Documento.

== Notable recordings ==
- Vozes da Rádio - Mappa do Coração (1997)
- Meja - Mellow (2004)
- Jane Birkin & Caetano Veloso - Rendez-Vous (2006)
- Teresa Salgueiro - La Serena (2007)
- Priscilla Ahn - Live Sessions EP (2008)
- Beirut - Red Hot + Rio 2 (2011)
- Mary Roos - Denk was du willst (2013)
- Palavra Cantada - Pauleco e Sandreca (2013)
- Lionel Loueke and Céline Rudolph - Obsession (2017)

== See also ==
- List of bossa nova standards
