= Zeca Veloso =

Zeca Veloso (born 7 March 1992) is a Brazilian singer and musician. Zeca was nominated for a best new artist award at the 2026 Latin Grammy Awards.

== Musical career ==
Zeza Veloso started playing the guitar at age eight.

Zeca Veloso's song "Todo homen" was the theme song for the 2018 telenovela Onde Nascem os Fortes (Land of the Strong).

Zeca released his first solo album Boas Novas - an anagram of bossa nova - in 2025. Zeca credits many of the US R&B and soul artists he listened to grown up, including Prince, Marvin Gaye, Shuggie Otis, the Delfonics, and the Four Tops, in influencing the sound of this album. He says that these sonic influences may not be immediately obvious because of the arrangement of his compositions.

== Personal life ==
Zeca Veloso is the son of Brazilian musician Caetano Veloso and Paula Lavigne. Zeca has two brothers: Moreno Veloso (son of Caetano Veloso and Andréa Gadelha) and Tom Veloso.

Zeca is a member of the Igreja Universal Evangelical church. In an 2026 interview, Zeca stated "Jesus is the most important thing in my life."

In August 2026 he married Mariana Fernandes in Rio de Janeiro.
