= Foxy (album) =

Studio album by Sparkle Division
- Released: October 20, 2023
- Genre: Electronic music
- Length: 33:44
- Label: Temporary Residence

Sparkle Division chronology
Classified EP (2021)	Foxy (2023)

Foxy is a 2023 studio album by American electronic music group Sparkle Division. The band's second full-length, this is a concept album following the events of a party in the late 1960s.

== Reception ==
Editors at AllMusic rated this album 3.5 out of 5 stars, with critic Paul Simpson writing that this album successfully blends musical genres "retaining elements of exotica and spy soundtracks but adding '90s-style lounge grooves and breakbeats. Writing for Pitchfork, Jesse Locke scored this release a 7.5 out of 10, writing that the album "stays compelling until the finish".

== Track listing ==
1. "Have Some Punch" – 3:00
2. "Here Comes Trouble" – 3:44
3. "Foxy" – 3:24
4. "The Punch!" – 8:37
5. "Bitch Fight" – 3:47
6. "Oh Yeah!" – 3:04
7. "Slip and Slide" – 3:09
8. "We Were There" – 4:59

== Personnel ==
Sparkle Division

- William Basinski
- Preston Wendel
- Gary Thomas Wright

Additional personnel

- Josh Bonati – mastering
- Max Kaplan – saxophone
- Craig Varian – drum programming
- Michael Wertz – design, illustrations

== See also ==
- 2023 in American music
- List of 2023 albums
