= Uns (album) =

Studio album by Caetano Veloso
- Released: 1983
- Recorded: 1983
- Genre: MPB
- Length: 35:01
- Label: Philips, Universal
- Producer: Caetano Veloso

Caetano Veloso chronology
Cores, Nomes (1982)	Uns (1983)	Estrangeiro (1989)

Professional ratings
Review scores
Source	Rating
Allmusic	4/5 stars

Uns (transl. Some) is an album by Brazilian singer Caetano Veloso, released in 1983.

== Track listing ==
1. "Uns" (Caetano Veloso)
2. "Musical" (Péricles Cavalcanti)
3. "Eclipse oculto" (Veloso)
4. "Peter Gast" (Veloso)
5. "Quero ir a Cuba" (Veloso)
6. "Coisa mais linda" (Carlos Lyra, Vinícius de Moraes)
7. "Você é linda" (Veloso)
8. "Bobagens, meu filho, bobagens" (Marina Lima, Antonio Cícero)
9. "A outra banda da terra" (Veloso)
10. "Salva-vida" (Veloso)
11. "É hoje" (Didi, Mestrinho)

== Production ==
- Coordination and assistance in production: Marcia Alvarez
- Recording engineer: Jairo Gualberto
- Auxiliary Studio: Manuel and Marcio
- Mixing and Editing: Jairo Gualberto João Augusto e Caetano Veloso
- Court: Ivan Lisnik
- Regimentation and copies: Clovis Mello
- Creation, typography and layout: Oscar Ramos
- Artwork: Jorge Vianna
- Cover photo (Caetano, Roberto and Rodrigo Veloso): Carlos Alexandre Moreira Salles
- Back Cover Photo: Arlete Kotchounian
- Color photography: Peter Farkas
- Graphic production: Edson Araujo
