= Muito (Dentro da Estrela Azulada) =

Muito (Dentro da estrela azulada)

Studio album by Caetano Veloso
- Released: 1978
- Genre: MPB
- Label: Philips

Caetano Veloso chronology
Bicho (1977)	Muito (Dentro da estrela azulada) (1978)	Maria Bethânia e Caetano Veloso ao vivo (1978)

Professional ratings
Review scores
Source	Rating
Allmusic	4/5 stars

Muito (Dentro da Estrela Azulada) (English: Much (In the blue star)) is an album by Brazilian singer and composer Caetano Veloso, released in 1978. The song "Sampa", which describes Veloso's first impressions of São Paulo city, was voted by the Brazilian edition of Rolling Stone as the 42nd greatest Brazilian song.

== Track listing ==
All songs by Caetano Veloso except where noted otherwise

1. "Terra" - 6:43
2. "Tempo de estio" - 5:06
3. "Muito romântico" - 2:28
4. "Quem cochicha o rabo espicha" (Jorge Ben) - 4:19
5. "Eu sei que vou te amar" (Antonio Carlos Jobim, Vinicius de Moraes) - 3:52
6. "Muito 3:23"
7. "Sampa" - 3:17
8. "Love love love" - 3:04
9. "Cá já" - 5:59
10. "São João, Xangô menino" (Caetano Veloso, Gilberto Gil) - 2:40
11. "Eu te amo" - 3:59

== Personnel ==
- Technical Writing: Paulinho "Chocolate" (Estúdio A), Vítor e Jairo (Estúdio B)
- Wizards: Rafael, Aníbal e Vítor
- Mixing: Paulinho "Chocolate"
- Cutting: Ivan Lisnik
- Production Director: Caetano Veloso
- Production Coordenation: Roberto Santana
- Cover: Aldo luiz
- Artwork: Arthur Fróes
- Photo: Januário Garcia
