= Caetano Veloso (1971 album) =

Studio album by Caetano Veloso
- Released: 1971
- Genre: MPB, folk rock
- Length: 35:52
- Label: PolyGram
- Producer: Lou Reizner and Ralph Mace

Caetano Veloso chronology
Caetano Veloso (1969)	Caetano Veloso (1971)	Transa (1972)

Professional ratings
Review scores
Source	Rating
Allmusic	link

Caetano Veloso is the third self-titled album by Caetano Veloso. It was recorded in England, when the artist was in an exile imposed by the Brazilian military dictatorship for being subversive. It is mostly sung in English and portrays a sad tone throughout, reflecting his feelings about homesickness and the absence of his family and friends. It was released first in Europe, and then in Brazil, in 1971.

== Background ==
Between 1969 and 1971, Veloso lived in Chelsea, downtown London, as a consequence of the exile imposed on him by the Brazilian military dictatorship. The musician shared a home with his fellow exilé and friend Gilberto Gil, their respective wives and their manager. The latter arrived first in Europe and was tasked with searching for a place for them to stay. Lisbon and Madrid were soon rejected due to the dictatorships that Portugal and Spain were subjected to back then. Paris, the French capital, was also ruled out because its music scene was deemed "boring", according to Gil. London was considered by them the best city for a musician to live.

Veloso spent the first year of his exile feeling depressed and homesick, although he and Gil actively participated in the local musical scene, watching The Rolling Stones shows, jamming with fellow musicians and having their first contact with reggae.

One day, Caetano was approached by local producer Ralph Mace, who had just left Philips Records (Veloso's former label in Brazil), and was offered the possibility of recording an album in English. Soon, Lou Reizner, Mace's American colleague, joined the project, but left it near its completion due to some disagreements. Despite that, he was still credited as the album's co-producer.

== Recording ==
The album was recorded in 1970. It marked the first time Veloso played the acoustic guitar in one of his albums, out of incentive by Mace; in the previous releases, producers wouldn't let him play the instrument. Veloso would later say that "if I hadn't been arrested and exiled, maybe I would never have played the acoustic guitar in an album." Veloso suggested Gil played the guitar after showing the song "London, London" to Mace, but the latter thought having another person play the instrument would make the song "lose its charm". Veloso was not confident about his abilities with the guitar, but Mace and Reizner convinced him that his frailties were part of the "charm of the song".

The song "Maria Bethânia" is dedicated to his sister, and in its lyrics the singer asks her to send news from Brazil. Through its verses, Veloso turns the word "better" into his sister's second name. As for the instrumental part, Veloso made some improvisations accompanied by the same string quartet that recorded "Eleanor Rigby" with the Beatles.

== Legacy ==
The opening track "A Little More Blue" was partially censored by the Brazilian military dictatorship; the lyrics mention actress Libertad Lamarque and the military took it for an allusion to the liberty of anti-dictatorship activist Carlos Lamarca.

"London, London" was covered by Brazilian rock band RPM on their 1986 live album Rádio Pirata ao Vivo. Journalist Mauro Ferreira from G1 claims that Jimmy Fontana's hit "Che sarà" copies portions of "London London", which he supposedly got to know via Gal Costa during a visit to Brazil (Costa had released the song one year prior).

In 2010, Veloso would describe the album as "a document of depression" and would say that only then did he start to appreciate the music he had made in exile, which, according to him, helped him become a more creative musician and a stronger person.

In 7 March 2021, celebrating the album's 50th anniversary, Veloso performed "London, London", "If You Hold a Stone", "Nine out of Ten" and "It's a Long Way" (the two latter coming from his next album Transa, which was also recorded in exile) in a live streaming performance on Cultura Inglesa Festival.

== Track listing ==
All tracks are written by Caetano Veloso except where noted

Side one
No.	Title	Length
1.	"A Little More Blue"	4:55
2.	"London, London"	4:15
3.	"Maria Bethânia"	6:55

Side two
No.	Title	Length
4.	"If You Hold a Stone"	6:06
5.	"Shoot Me Dead"	3:15
6.	"In the Hot Sun of a Christmas Day" (Caetano Veloso, Gilberto Gil)	3:14
7.	"Asa Branca" (Humberto Teixeira, Luiz Gonzaga)	7:20

== Personnel ==
- Johnny Clamp – Photography
- Linda Glover – Cover Design
- John Iles – Engineer
- Ralph Mace – Producer
- Lou Reizner – Producer
- Phil Ryan – String Arrangements
- John Timperley – Engineer
- Caetano Veloso – Guitar, Vocals
