= Dona Canô =

Brazilian centenarian

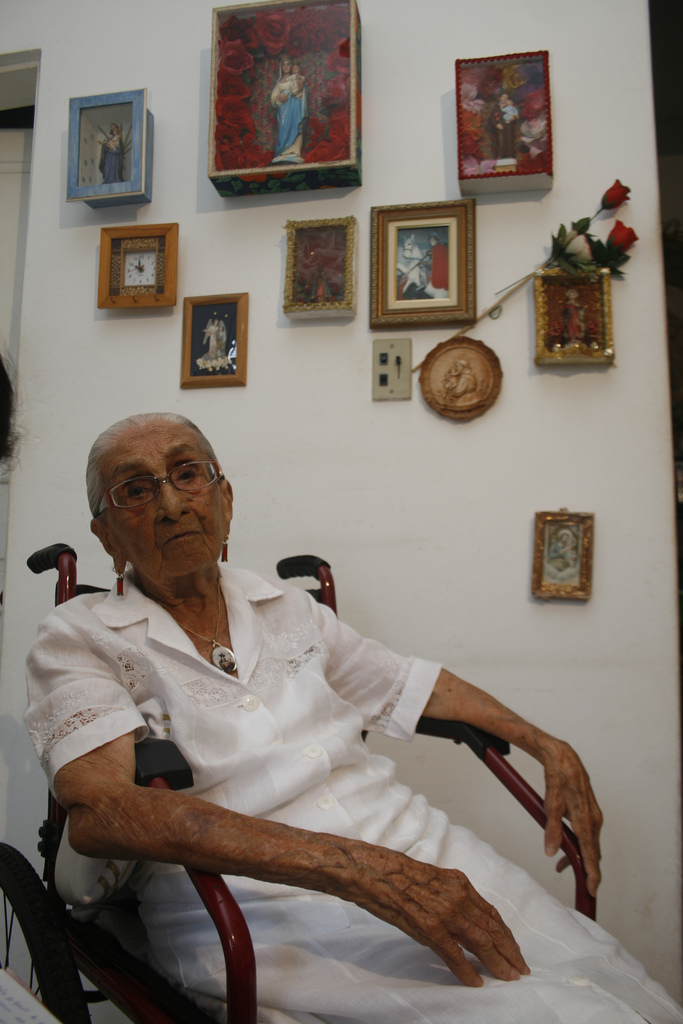
- Dona Canô
- Born: Claudionor Viana Teles Veloso; 16 September 1907; Santo Amaro, Bahia, Brazil
- Died: 25 December 2012 (aged 105); Santo Amaro, Bahia, Brazil
- Known for: Mother of musicians Caetano Veloso and Maria Bethânia
- Spouse: José Teles Veloso (m. 1931; died 1983)
- Children: 2

Claudionor Viana Teles Veloso, better known as Dona Canô (1907–2012), was the mother of two popular Brazilian musicians, Caetano Veloso and Maria Bethânia. She also inspired a famous song performed by Daniela Mercury, called "Dona Canô". Known for her strong personality, she was a leading figure within her home town of Santo Amaro, Bahia.

== Life ==
Claudionor Viana Teles Veloso was born in Santo Amaro, Bahia in Brazil on 16 September 1907. She got the name "Canô" from a childhood friend who was unable to pronounce "Claudionor". In January 1931, she married José Teles Veloso, a postal employee, and they had eight children, two of whom were adopted. Her husband died in 1983, at the age of 82. Although the mother of two famous Brazilians, she became well known in her own right, becoming one of Brazil's most respected personalities, although she is quoted as saying that she did not know why.

Dona Canô was friendly with Antônio Carlos Magalhães, who was elected Governor of Bahia state on three occasions and held other leading political positions. She was also friendly with the Brazilian president, Luiz Inácio Lula da Silva. Her memoirs were recorded in a book entitled Canô Velloso, lembranças do saber viver (Canô Velloso, memories of knowing how to live) by Antônio Guerreiro de Freitas and Arthur Assis Gonçalves da Silva.

Having herself received some training in music and theatre, she strongly supported the artistic development of her children, particularly of Caetano, who recorded his first album at the age of ten. Dona Canô inspired a famous song written by Neguinho do Samba and sung by Daniela Mercury, which begins Caetano, Venha ver aquele preto que você gosta! (Caetano, come see that black man you like!), referring to the singer Gilberto Gil.

== Death ==
Dona Canô died at home on 25 December 2012. Her name is remembered at several locations, including a theatre in her home town.
