= Estrangeiro =

Studio album by Caetano Veloso
- Released: 1989
- Genre: MPB
- Length: 39:13
- Label: Philips
- Producer: Peter Scherer, Arto Lindsay

Caetano Veloso chronology
Uns (1983)	Estrangeiro (1989)	Circuladô (1991)

Professional ratings
Review scores
Source	Rating
Allmusic	3/5 stars

Estrangeiro (transl. Foreigner) is a 1989 album by the Brazilian singer Caetano Veloso. It was produced by Peter Scherer and Arto Lindsay and features Naná Vasconcelos, Carlinhos Brown, Bill Frisell and Marc Ribot. Robert Christgau named it 27th on "The 1989 Pazz & Jop Critics Poll" of best albums released in that year.

== Track listing ==
#	Title	Songwriters	Length
1.	"O Estrangeiro"	Caetano Veloso	6:16
2.	"Rai das Cores"	Caetano Veloso	2:38
3.	"Branquinha"	Caetano Veloso	2:36
4.	"Os Outros Românticos"	Caetano Veloso, engl. transl. by Lindsay	4:59
5.	"Jasper"	Arto Lindsay, Peter Scherer, Caetano Veloso	4:59
6.	"Este Amor"	Caetano Veloso	3:28
7.	"Outro Retrato"	Caetano Veloso	4:59
8.	"Etc."	Caetano Veloso	2:06
9.	"Meia-Lua Inteira"	Carlinhos Brown	3:45
10.	"Genipapo Absoluto"	Caetano Veloso	3:23

== Personnel ==
- Caetano Veloso: vocals, acoustic guitar (on tracks 3, 8, 10)
- Peter Scherer: keyboards (on 1–7, 9)
- Arto Lindsay: guitar (on 1, 3–5, 9) and voice (on 4)
- Bill Frisell: guitar (on 1, 6)
- Marc Ribot: guitar (on 1, 7)
- Toni Costa: guitar (on 2, 9) and acoustic guitar (on 10)
- Tavinho Fialho: bass (on 2, 9)
- Tony Lewis: drums (on 1)
- Cesinha: drums (on 2, 9)
- Naná Vasconcelos: percussion (on 1, 5–8)
- Carlinhos Brown: percussion (on 2, 4, 9)
