= Jóia (album) =

- The original, uncensored cover

Studio album by Caetano Veloso
- Released: 1975
- Genre: MPB; folk music
- Length: 38:48
- Label: PolyGram; Universal
- Producer: Caetano Veloso; Perinho Albuquerque

Caetano Veloso chronology
Qualquer Coisa (1975)	Jóia (1975)	Doces Bárbaros (1976)

Alternate cover
- Reissue cover, as allowed by the censors

Professional ratings
Review scores
Source	Rating
AllMusic	4.5/5 stars
The Encyclopedia of Popular Music	4/5 stars

Jóia (transl. Jewel) is a 1975 studio album by Caetano Veloso. The album was released simultaneously with Qualquer Coisa. The original cover art, picturing Veloso, his wife and his son naked, was censored by the ruling Brazilian military dictatorship and substituted by one with only doves on it.

== Background ==
The album was originally planned as a double album together with its follow-up, Qualquer Coisa, but was ultimately released as two separate albums issued simultaneously. The original LP catalog number is 6349 132. "Help" is a cover of the Beatles song, and Veloso also covered Beatles material on Qualquer Coisa. "Lua, Lua, Lua, Lua" and "Joia" are self-covers of songs he had previously written for Gal Costa; Costa's versions appear on her album Cantar (1974).

The artwork for the original cover was painted by Veloso himself. However, because it depicted nude figures of Veloso, his wife, and their son, it became controversial, and an alternative version featuring only a bird from the original illustration was also released.

Philip Jandovský of AllMusic awarded the album 4.5 out of 5 stars, describing it as "quiet, soft, and largely acoustic, similar to Qualquer Coisa," and calling it "a great album and, for many listeners, one of the finest recordings Veloso has ever made."

Among the bonus tracks added to the 2012 Japanese SHM-CD release (UICY-94813), "Let It Bleed" is a cover of the Rolling Stones song that had previously appeared on the 1976 compilation album Palco Corpo e Alma.

== Track listing ==
1. "Minha mulher" (Caetano Veloso) – 4:46
2. "Guá" (Perinho Albuquerque, Caetano Veloso) – 3:13
3. "Pelos olhos" (Caetano Veloso) – 2:35
4. "Asa, Asa" (Caetano Veloso) – 1:36
5. "Lua, lua, lua, lua" (Caetano Veloso) – 3:59
6. "Canto do povo de um lugar" (Caetano Veloso) – 4:11
7. "Pipoca moderna" (Sebastião Biano, Caetano Veloso) – 3:11
8. "Jóia" (Caetano Veloso) – 1:27
9. "Help" (Lennon, McCartney) – 2:30
10. "Gravidade" (Caetano Veloso) – 2:55
11. "Tudo tudo tudo" (Caetano Veloso) – 2:00
12. "Na asa do vento" (Luiz Vieira, João do Vale) – 4:08
13. "Escapulário" (Oswald de Andrade, Caetano Veloso) – 2:17
