= Doces Bárbaros =

1976 live album by Doces Bárbaros

Live album by Doces Bárbaros (Caetano Veloso, Gilberto Gil, Maria Bethânia, and Gal Costa)
- Released: 1976
- Recorded: June 24, 1976; Anhembi Stadium; São Paulo, Brazil
- Genre: MPB
- Label: Philips
- Producer: Gapa, Perinho Albuquerque

Caetano Veloso chronology
Jóia (1975)	Doces Bárbaros (1976)	Caetano... muitos carnavais... (1977)

Gilberto Gil chronology
Refazenda (1975)	Doces Bárbaros (1976)	O Viramundo (1977)

Maria Bethânia chronology
Chico Buarque & Maria Bethânia ao vivo (1975)	Doces Bárbaros (1976)	Pássaro Proibido (1976)

Gal Costa chronology
Gal canta Caymmi (1976)	Doces Bárbaros (1976)	Caras e Bocas (1977)

Professional ratings
Review scores
Source	Rating
AllMusic	3/5 stars

Doces Bárbaros is a 1976 album by the música popular brasileira supergroup of the same name. It was recorded June 24 of that year at Anhembi Stadium in São Paulo. Its members were Gilberto Gil, Caetano Veloso, Maria Bethânia and Gal Costa, four of the biggest names in the history of the music of Brazil. The band was the subject of a 1977 documentary directed by Jom Tob Azulay. In 1994, they performed a tribute concert to Mangueira school of samba.

It was listed by Rolling Stone Brazil as one of the 100 best Brazilian albums in history.

A documentary of the show was made during the show's Brazilian tour in 1976, it opened in theaters all over Brazil in 1977.

== Cover art ==
Each member's agent wanted their respective artist to appear first on the cover. In order to please the four of them, artist Aldo Luiz used a picture by Orlando Abrunhosa. In the photograph, all members are lying down on the ground and forming an "x", but only their heads are shown. The agents were then convinced that each member could be considered the first depending on the viewer's perspective.

== Track listing ==
Side one
No.	Title	Writer(s)	Length
1.	"Os Mais Doces Bárbaros"	Caetano Veloso	6:42
2.	"Fé Cega, Faca Amolada"	Milton Nascimento, Ronaldo Bastos	5:30
3.	"Atiraste Uma Pedra"	Herivelto Martins, David Nasser	3:59
4.	"Pássaro Proibido"	Veloso, Maria Bethânia	4:38

Side two
No.	Title	Writer(s)	Length
5.	"Chuckberry Fields Forever"	Gilberto Gil	5:25
6.	"Gênesis"	Veloso	8:46
7.	"Tarasca Guidon"	Waly Salomão	7:27

Side three
No.	Title	Writer(s)	Length
1.	"Eu E Ela Estávamos Ali Encostados Na Parede"	Gil	4:13
2.	"Esotérico"	Gil	4:09
3.	"Eu Te Amo"	Veloso	3:00
4.	"O Seu Amor"	Gil	4:27
5.	"Quando"	Veloso, Gil, Gal Costa	4:13

Side four
No.	Title	Writer(s)	Length
6.	"Pé Quente, Cabeça Fria"	Gil	3:49
7.	"Peixe"	Veloso	3:16
8.	"Um Índio"	Veloso	4:42
9.	"São João, Xangô Menino"	Veloso, Gil	4:31
10.	"Nós, Por Exemplo"	Gil	4:01
11.	"Os Mais Doces Bárbaros (Reprise)"	Veloso	1:20
