= To Feel Embraced =

Studio album by Sparkle Division
- Released: July 24, 2020
- Recorded: 2016
- Genre: Electronic music
- Length: 41:22
- Label: Temporary Residence

Sparkle Division chronology
To Feel Embraced (2020)	Classified EP (2021)

To Feel Embraced is a 2020 studio album by American electronic music group Sparkle Division.

== Reception ==
According to the review aggregator Metacritic, To Feel Embraced received "generally favorable reviews" based on a weighted average score of 74 out of 100 from four critic scores. Editors at AllMusic rated this album 4 out of 5 stars, with critic Paul Simpson writing that "the album's sound is a Brainfeeder-like mélange of cosmic jazz, crumpled hip-hop beats, and atmospheric textures, flowing from brassy lounge cut-ups to blunted psychedelic funk" and the music "is celebratory rather than mournful, channeling the positive, creative energy of these spirits and honoring the fleeting miracle of life". Luke Cartledge of Loud and Quiet scored this album 10 out of 10, writing "the unobtrusive conventions of 21st century ambient music, and particularly the more vaporwave-adjacent strands of the contemporary classical canon, are upended, their glazed inertia replaced by a maximalist approach to making you relax, forcing a good time out of you rather than allowing some more abstract euphoria to do the heavy lifting". Writing for Pitchfork, Madison Bloom rated To Feel Embraced a 7.6 out of 10, stating that it "is not a project that promotes stasis in any way shape or form" and it is "an album of serious artists making music that is more concerned with immediate joy and emotional exploration than decay or deep space".

== Track listing ==
1. "You Go Girl!" – 1:24
2. "You Ain't Takin' My Man" – 4:14
3. "For Gato" – 3:06
4. "Oh Henry!" – 4:20
5. "To the Stars Major Tom" – 2:46
6. "Oh No You Did Not!" – 4:04
7. "To Feel" – 6:07
8. "To Feel Embraced" – 3:08
9. "Slappin' Yo Face" – 1:26
10. "Mmmmkayy I'm Goin' Out Now and I Don't Want Any Trouble from You!" – 3:24
11. "Queenie Got Her Blues" – 1:06
12. "Sparkle On Sad Sister Mother Queen" – 1:46
13. "No Exit" – 4:31

== Personnel ==
Sparkle Division

- William Basinski – art direction, production, executive production
- Preston Wendel – mixing, production, art direction

Additional personnel

- Molly Kaplan – art direction, design, layout
- Bo Kondren – mastering
- Nolan Thies – engineering

== See also ==
- 2020 in American music
- List of 2020 albums
