= Bicho (album) =

Studio album by Caetano Veloso
- Released: 1977
- Genre: MPB
- Length: 35:18
- Label: PolyGram, Universal.,
- Producer: Perinho Albuquerque

Caetano Veloso chronology
Caetano... muitos carnavais... (1977)	Bicho (1977)	Muito (dentro da estrela azulada) (1978)

Professional ratings
Review scores
Source	Rating
AllMusic	4.5/5 stars

Bicho (Polysemical term, meaning any wild, non-human animal or insect/bug, in Portuguese; used as a term of endearment in late 60's Brazil) is a 1977 studio album by Caetano Veloso. The album was recorded after Veloso spent a month with Gilberto Gil in Lagos, Nigeria, and the influence of African music such as Jùjú can be heard throughout the album.

== Track listing ==
1. Odara (Caetano Veloso) - 7:16
2. Two naira Fifty kobo (Caetano Veloso) - 5:04
3. Gente (Caetano Veloso) - 3:37
4. Olha o menino (Jorge Ben) - 3:03
5. Um índio (Caetano Veloso) - 2:56
6. A grande borboleta (Caetano Veloso) - 1:12
7. Tigresa (Caetano Veloso) - 6:21
8. O Leãozinho (Caetano Veloso) - 3:06
9. Alguém cantando (Caetano Veloso) - 2:43
