= Muitos Carnavais =

Caetano... muitos carnavais...

Compilation album by Caetano Veloso
- Released: 1977
- Genre: MPB, samba, frevo, marchinhas
- Length: 36:03
- Label: Philips
- Producer: Perinho Albuquerque

Caetano Veloso chronology
Doces Bárbaros (1976)	Caetano... muitos carnavais... (1977)	Bicho (1977)

Professional ratings
Review scores
Source	Rating
AllMusic	4/5 stars

Caetano... muitos carnavais... is a 1977 compilation album by Caetano Veloso. It exclusively features Carnaval songs and rhythms, such as samba, frevo and marchinhas.

== Track listing ==
#	Title	Songwriters	Length
1.	"Muitos carnavais"	Caetano Veloso	2:41
2.	"Chuva, suor e cerveja (Rain, sweat and beer)"	Caetano Veloso	3:26
3.	"A filha da Chiquita Bacana"	Caetano Veloso	3:32
4.	"Deus e o diabo"	Caetano Veloso	2:44
5.	"Piaba"	Caetano Veloso	3:10
6.	"Hora da razão"	Batatinha, J. Luna	2:50
7.	"Atrás do trio elétrico"	Caetano Veloso	2:44
8.	"Um frevo novo"	Caetano Veloso	2:55
9.	"Cara a cara"	Caetano Veloso	3:04
10.	"La barca"	Caetano Veloso, Moacir Albuquerque	2:06
11.	"Qual é, baiana?"	Caetano Veloso, Moacir Albuquerque	2:52
12.	"Guarde seu conselho"	Luís de França, Alcebíades Nogueira	3:52
