= Cinema Transcendental =

Studio album by Caetano Veloso
- Released: 1979
- Recorded: 1979
- Studio: PolyGram Studios, Rio de Janeiro
- Genre: MPB
- Length: 40:04
- Label: PolyGram, Universal, Verve
- Producer: Caetano Veloso

Caetano Veloso chronology
Maria Bethânia e Caetano Veloso ao vivo (1978)	Cinema Transcendental (1979)	Outras Palavras (1981)

Professional ratings
Review scores
Source	Rating
AllMusic	4.5/5 stars
Spin Alternative Record Guide	7/10

Cinema Transcendental is an album by Brazilian singer and composer Caetano Veloso, released in 1979. Some of the album tracks were hits in Brazil, such as "Lua de São Jorge", "Oração ao Tempo", and "Beleza Pura".

== Background ==
This album is the second collaboration with Veloso's regular band, A Outra Banda da Terra ("Another Band of the Earth"), and the track "Aracaju" was co-written with members of the band. The song "Vampiro (Vampire)" is a cover of Jorge Mautner (Portuguese version); Veloso reportedly first encountered Mautner in London during his exile in 1969 and was deeply impressed by this song. Notably, Veloso and Mautner's 2002 collaborative album Eu Não Peço Desculpa includes a self-cover of the track "Cajuína," which also appears on this album.

The Japanese SHM-CD edition released in 2012 (UICY-94818) includes a bonus track, "Massa Heróica," originally released as a single in December 1979.

== Track listing ==
All songs by Caetano Veloso except where noted.

No.	Title	Writer(s)	Length
1.	"Lua de São Jorge"		3:57
2.	"Oração ao Tempo"		3:25
3.	"Beleza Pura"		3:30
4.	"Menino do Rio"		2:28
5.	"Vampiro"	Jorge Mautner	4:03
6.	"Elegia"	Péricles Cavalcanti and Augusto de Campos	2:19
7.	"Trilhos Urbanos"		2:46
8.	"Louco por Você"		7:40
9.	"Cajuína"		2:20
10.	"Aracaju"	Tomás Improta, Vinícius Cantuária and Caetano Veloso	2:23

== Personnel ==
- Arranger, Group - A Outra Banda Da Terra
- Bass - Arnaldo Brandã
- Arranger, Acoustic Guitar, Primary Artist, Producer, Vocals, Voices - Caetano Veloso
- Mixing - Jairo Pires
- Choir/Chorus - Lucia Turbull
- Engineer, Mixing, Producer - Luis Claudio Coutinho
- Engineer, Producer - Paulo Chocolate
- Electric Guitar - Perinho Santana
- Preparation, Release Preparation - Sheila Mathis
- Keyboards - Tomás Improta
- Drums - Vinicius Cantuária
