= A Foreign Sound =

Studio album by Caetano Veloso
- Released: 6 April 2004
- Recorded: 2003
- Studio: AR Estúdio, Rio de Janeiro
- Genre: Jazz; pop; bossa nova
- Length: 1:15:13
- Language: English
- Label: Nonesuch, Mercury, Universal
- Producer: Caetano Veloso, Jaques Morelenbaum

Caetano Veloso chronology
Eu Não Peço Desculpa (2002)	A Foreign Sound (2004)	Onqotô (2005)

A Foreign Sound is the thirtieth studio album by Brazilian singer, songwriter and guitarist Caetano Veloso, released on 6 April 2004 on the record label Nonesuch. The recording consists of Veloso's interpolations of songs from the Great American Songbook, including compositions by a variety of writers, ranging from Tin Pan Alley standards by Irving Berlin and Cole Porter to works by David Byrne and Kurt Cobain, being Veloso's first album performed entirely in English. The album title comes from a verse in Bob Dylan's "It's Alright, Ma (I'm Only Bleeding)": "So don't fear if you hear / A foreign sound to your ear".

== Background and recording ==
Caetano Veloso and Gilberto Gil were exiled from Brazil and went to London from 1969 to 1972, during the military dictatorship in Brazil, falsely accused of performing a parody of the Brazilian National Anthem to the tune of "Tropicália" at the Sucata Club in Rio de Janeiro. (Note: Attributed to multiple references:) During Veloso's time in exile, he was exposed to a variety of Western musical traditions that broadened his artistic perspective and deepened his appreciation for international music. He considered recording an "Anglo-American" repertoire when he returned to Brazil. In the 1990s, while visiting New York City, Nonesuch Records president Robert Hurwitz encouraged Veloso to record an album with songs by Cole Porter and Bob Dylan, believing that Veloso was uniquely capable who could interpret both artists in one album. The reflections on Brazilian identity and its representation on the global stage, exemplified by Portuguese singer Carmen Miranda, also influenced the creation of the album.

During the album's production, Veloso was navigating his separation from Paula Lavigne, whom he married in 1986. The recording took him nine months to complete—a process characterized by protracted studio sessions and persistent challenges, including pitch instability and bouts of depression. Veloso intended A Foreign Sound to serve as a response to the prevalent anti-American sentiments at the time.

Veloso states that the album's foreign tracks mainly refer to his childhood and memories. He also described it as an "alien disk" because "the English-speaking world is a somewhat uncomfortable intrusion due to its claim to intervene in a critical way". In his memoir, Tropical Truth: A Story of Music & Revolution in Brazil, he explains that he discovered some American jazz singer-songwriters and musicians—such as Billie Holiday, Ella Fitzgerald, and the Modern Jazz Quartet—by following the influence of his primary musical inspiration, João Gilberto. The album title comes from a verse in Bob Dylan's "It's Alright, Ma (I'm Only Bleeding)": "So don't fear if you hear / A foreign sound to your ear".

== Musical style ==
A Foreign Sound consists of 23 tracks predominantly featuring American standards from the Great American Songbook, blending various musical styles and genres such as North American jazz, pop music and bossa nova. While many songs are Tin Pan Alley standards, the album features compositions from Kurt Cobain, Stevie Wonder, and DNA; Veloso has cited rock music as being a vital influence for him. Veloso described his approach to the American Songbook as "atypical", mixing different styles and periods of composition.

Exceptionally, "Feelings" is a cover by a Brazilian musician, Morris Albert, and Veloso himself commented that the song was "a fake American song written by a Brazilian". Conversely, "Carioca" is a song about Brazil, but it was originally an insert song for the American film Flying Down to Rio, to which Veloso said it was "a fake Brazilian song written by Americans". In the album's liner notes, Veloso writes that "people all over the world would like to find a way of thanking American popular music for having made their lives and their music richer and more beautiful. Many try. So do I."

== Critical reception ==
Professional ratings
Review scores
Source	Rating
AllMusic	4.5/5 stars
Correio Braziliense	4/5 stars
Folha de S.Paulo	3/5 stars
The Guardian	2/5 stars
Pitchfork	8.8/10
Robert Christgau	A−

A Foreign Sound was met with mostly mixed acclaim from various music critics. John Bush gave the album a score of four and a half stars out of five on AllMusic, noting that "Veloso transforms these standards by a clever combination of his subtle interpretive gifts, his precise, literate delivery, and his ability to frame each song with an arrangement that fits perfectly with either song." Stephen Deusner, in his review for Pitchfork, gave the album an 8.8 out of 10, noting that "Veloso aims to reinterpret these songs, to make them sound new and foreign to American ears. And for the most part he succeeds." According to Don Thrasher from In These Times, the album "reveals the depth and diversity of American music as filtered through the eyes and ears of this knowledgeable outsider".

Pedro Alexandre Sanches, writing for Folha de S.Paulo, described A Foreign Sound as a work steeped in contradictions, highlighting how Veloso transforms "foreign" standards into "false Brazilian" creations in the spirit of tropicália. Sanches noted that tracks like "Feelings" by Morris Albert serve as a "conceptual centerpiece", blending "kitsch with sophistication" to craft a "tacky aesthetic". Sanches remarked that Veloso's reinterpretations of songs such as Paul Anka's "Diana" and Elvis Presley's "Love Me Tender" juxtapose conventions with inventive subversions, resulting in a "chessboard, labyrinth, and Rubik's cube" of musical ideas.

Robin Denselow from The Guardian gave the album two stars out of five, noting that while some tracks "do justice to Veloso's famously cool and intimate vocals", others are "pleasant but dull" or even "downright dreadful". The reviewer praised the simplicity of his acoustic renditions, particularly "Summertime" and the Latin-edged "There Will Never Be Another You", performed with Gilberto Gil. However, they criticized the album's less successful experiments, including a "ghastly arrangement of Paul Anka's 'Diana' " and a "dirge-like treatment of Stevie Wonder's 'If It's Magic' ".

Marcus Preto from Rolling Stone Brasil said that the album sounded "bureaucratic", "long" and "drawn out", stating: "Far from any piece one could expect from Caetano Veloso. The artist's worst work, perhaps". Matt Fink for Paste described A Foreign Sound by Caetano Veloso as "ambitious" and noted its wide-ranging selection of American pop classics, bringing together Cole Porter, Kurt Cobain, Irving Berlin, Bob Dylan, and Stevie Wonder under "one conceptual umbrella". Achy Obejas from Chicago Tribune describes the album as a "whole mess", saying that the only two that stand out are "Jamaica Farewell", which Veloso mostly leaves alone, and "The Man I Love", which is here "full of light and grace". The album was the subject in the critical-analytical music series 33+1/3 Brazil, titled Caetano Veloso's A Foreign Sound by Barbara Browning, written and published in 2017 as the first book in the series.

== Tracks ==
A Foreign Sound – Digital download edition
No.	Title	Writer(s)	Length
1.	"Carioca (The Carioca)"	Edward Eliscu, Vincent Youmans	3:31
2.	"So In Love"	Cole Porter	5:30
3.	"I Only Have Eyes For You"	Harry Warren, Al Dubin	1:20
4.	"It's Alright, Ma (I'm Only Bleeding)"	Bob Dylan	6:07
5.	"Body And Soul"	Robert Sour, Edward Heyman, Johnny Green, Frank Eyton	3:30
6.	"Nature Boy"	Eden Ahbez	1:58
7.	"The Man I Love"	George Gershwin	4:09
8.	"There Will Never Be Another You"	Harry Warren, Mack Gordon	1:47
9.	"Smoke Gets In Your Eyes"	Jerome Kern	2:38
10.	"Diana"	Paul Anka	3:28
11.	"Sophisticated Lady"	Duke Ellington, Mitchell Parish, Irving Mills	5:18
12.	"Come As You Are"	Kurt Cobain	4:16
13.	"Feelings"	Morris Albert, Louis Gasté	4:32
14.	"Summertime"	George Gershwin, Dorothy Heyward, Ira Gershwin	2:33
15.	"Detached"	Arto Lindsay, Ikue Mori, Tim Right	4:32
16.	"Jamaica Farewell"	Lord Burgess	2:44
17.	"Love For Sale"	Cole Porter	2:37
18.	"Cry Me A River"	Arthur Hamilton	3:10
19.	"If It's Magic"	Stevie Wonder	3:03
20.	"Something Good"	Richard Rodgers, Oscar Hammerstein II	1:38
21.	"Stardust"	Hoagy Carmichael	3:25
22.	"Blue Skies"	Irving Berlin	2:47
23.	"Love Me Tender" (Bonus track)	Elvis Presley, Vera Matson	3:23
Total length:			1:11:49

A Foreign Sound – Nonesuch CD edition
No.	Title	Writer(s)	Length
1.	"Carioca (The Carioca)"	Edward Eliscu, Vincent Youmans	3:33
2.	"So In Love"	Cole Porter	5:31
3.	"Always"	Harry Warren, Al Dubin	3:43
4.	"Come As You Are"	Kurt Cobain	4:17
5.	"Feelings"	Morris Albert, Louis Gasté	4:33
6.	"Love For Sale"	Cole Porter	2:38
7.	"The Man I Love"	George Gershwin	4:10
8.	"Smoke Gets In Your Eyes"	Jerome Kern	2:38
9.	"Cry Me A River"	Arthur Hamilton	3:11
10.	"Jamaica Farewell"	Lord Burgess	2:45
11.	"Nature Boy"	Eden Ahbez	1:59
12.	"Nothing But Flowers"	David Byrne	4:21
13.	"Manhattan"	Richard Rodgers, Lorenz Hart	3:58
14.	"Diana"	Paul Anka	3:29
15.	"Summertime"	George Gershwin, Dorothy Heyward, Ira Gershwin	2:33
16.	"It's Alright, Ma (I'm Only Bleeding)"	Bob Dylan	6:07
17.	"Love Me Tender"	Elvis Presley, Vera Matson	3:23
18.	"Body and Soul"	Robert Sour, Edward Heyman, Johnny Green, Frank Eyton	3:31
19.	"If It's Magic"	Stevie Wonder	3:05
20.	"Detached"	Arto Lindsay, Ikue Mori, Tim Right	1:30
21.	"Something Good"	Richard Rodgers, Oscar Hammerstein II	1:39
22.	"Blue Skies"	Irving Berlin	2:47
Total length:			1:15:21

A Foreign Sound – Mercury CD edition bonus track
No.	Title	Writer(s)	Length
23.	"I Only Have Eyes For You"	Harry Warren, Al Dubin	1:19
Total length:			1:16:40

== Personnel ==
The process of creating A Foreign Sound attributes the following credits:

=== Musicians ===
- Caetano Veloso – lead vocals (tracks 1–23), guitar (track 3), acoustic guitar (tracks 12, 14, 18, 21), steel-string guitar (track 15)
- Davi Moraes – electric guitar (tracks 1, 16), steel guitar (track 10), electric bass (tracks 1, 16), drums (track 1)
- Márcio Victor – timbau, snare drums, afoxé, bacurinha (track 1); timpani, caxixi, drum rim (track 10); finger snapping (track 14)
- Jó – timbaus, snare drums, surdo drums (track 1); timpani, bass drums, drum rim (track 10); finger snapping (track 14)
- Lula Galvão – acoustic guitar (tracks 2, 7)
- Zeca Assumpção – double bass (tracks 2, 7, 18)
- Marcelo Costa – drums (track 2); tambour, surdo (track 9)
- Jaques Morelenbaum – cello (tracks 2, 7, 13), finger snapping (track 14), celesta (track 17)
- Yura Ranevsky – cello (tracks 2–3, 5, 7, 14, 17, 20), finger snapping (track 14)
- Jorge Helder – double bass (tracks 2–3, 5, 7, 9, 14, 17, 20)
- Denner Campolina – double bass (tracks 2–3, 5, 7, 14, 17, 20)
- Carlinhos Brown – cajón, balafon, ponteiros, claves, cyber effects, handmade electronics, woodblock, egg shakers (track 22)

=== Production ===
- Jaques Morelenbaum – producer
- Bob Ludwig – mastering
- Marcelo Sabóia – mixing

== Charts ==
Weekly chart performance for A Foreign Sound
Chart (2002)	Peak position
Belgian Albums (Ultratop Flanders)	93
French Albums (SNEP)	74
Italian Albums (FIMI)	25
Portuguese Albums (AFP)	3
US Heatseekers Albums (Billboard)	41
US World Albums (Billboard)	2

== Certifications ==
Certifications for A Foreign Sound
Region	Certification	Certified units/sales
Brazil (Pro-Música Brasil)	Gold	70,000

== Release history ==
Country	Date	Format	Label(s)
Brazil	6 April 2004	CD	Mercury
USA	6 April 2004	CD	Nonesuch
Japan	21 May 2004	CD	EmArcy

== Bibliography ==
- Browning, Barbara (7 September 2017). Caetano Veloso's A Foreign Sound. Bloomsbury Publishing USA. ISBN 9781501319259.
