= Circuladô =

Studio album by Caetano Veloso
- Released: 1991
- Label: Elektra/Nonesuch
- Producer: Arto Lindsay

Caetano Veloso chronology
Estrangeiro (1989)	Circuladô (1991)	Circuladô Vivo (1992)

Circuladô is an album by the Brazilian musician Caetano Veloso. It was released in 1991. Circuladô was Veloso's third album to be widely distributed in the United States.

== Production ==
The album was produced by Arto Lindsay, who also cowrote "Ela Ela". It was recorded in New York and Rio de Janeiro. "Circuladô de Fulô" was inspired by a Haroldo de Campos poem. Melvin Gibbs played bass on the album; Ryuichi Sakamoto and Gilberto Gil also contributed.

== Critical reception ==
Professional ratings
Review scores
Source	Rating
AllMusic	4/5 stars
The Encyclopedia of Popular Music	3/5 stars
MusicHound World: The Essential Album Guide	4/5 stars
The Rolling Stone Album Guide	4/5 stars
Spin Alternative Record Guide	8/10

The New York Times praised the "mixture of pointed observation and fatalistic acceptance [that] typifies Mr. Veloso's world view... More than a diarist or a social commentator, at his best he is a true poet." Newsday called "Santa Clara, Padroeira da Televisão" "a stunning, satirical blend of spiritual imagery and media criticism."

The Edmonton Journal wrote that "the music on Circulado takes an impressionistic course that's more quietly experimental, working touches of jazz improvisation among the guitar and percussion lines." The Gazette stated that "there is folk, jazz, samba, bossa nova, new age and funk all rolled into one... Sensuous and seductive, the spirit of tropicalismo is alive and well."

AllMusic wrote that "Itapuã" "is a modern elegy for the beautiful beach, where Veloso is backed by a contemporary arrangement for string quartet and rhythmic section." Stephen Holden, of The New York Times, listed Circuladô as the second best album of 1992.

In 2022, it was elected as one of the best Brazilian music albums of the last 40 years by a O Globo poll which involved 25 specialists, including Charles Gavin, Nelson Motta, and others.

== Track listing ==
No.	Title	Length
1.	"Fora Da Ordem"
2.	"Circuladô de Fulô"
3.	"Itapuã"
4.	"Boas Vindas"
5.	"Ela Ela"
6.	"Santa Clara, Padroeira da Televisão"
7.	"Baião da Penha"
8.	"Neide Candolina"
9.	"A Terceira Margem do Rio"
10.	"O Cu do Mundo"
11.	"Lindeza"
