= You Don't Know Me (Caetano Veloso song) =

1972 song by Caetano Veloso

Song by Caetano Veloso

from the album Transa
- Language: English; Portuguese
- Released: 1972
- Studio: 1971; Chappell's Recording Studios, London, England
- Genre: Bossa nova; samba raiz
- Length: 3:49
- Label: Phillips
- Songwriter: Caetano Veloso
- Producer: Ralph Mace

"You Don't Know Me" is a song by Brazilian singer-songwriter Caetano Veloso, included on his sixth studio album, Transa (1972). Written and performed by Veloso himself in both English and Portuguese, and produced by Ralph Mace, the track is regarded as one of the artist’s most representative works of the 1970s.

The song incorporates excerpts from "Maria Moita", written by Carlos Lyra and Vinicius de Moraes, as well as from "Hora do Adeus" by Luiz Gonzaga.

== Release and reception ==
The song was released alongside Transa in January 1972, in cassette tape and LP formats. Among the album’s seven compositions, "You Don't Know Me", "Nine Out of Ten", and "It's a Long Way" were the most critically acclaimed.

In 2016, "You Don’t Know Me" was ranked by the American magazine Pitchfork as the 73rd best song of the 1970s, with Kevin Lozano describing it as "a masterpiece of a song that could only be written from the point of view of an exile."

== Re-recording ==
"You Don't Know Me"

Single by Luísa Sonza and Caetano Veloso

from the album Escândalo Íntimo
- Language: English; Portuguese
- Released: 28 May 2024
- Genre: Bossa nova; samba raiz
- Length: 3:40
- Label: Sony Brazil
- Songwriter: Caetano Veloso
- Producer: Lucas Nunes

Caetano Veloso re-recorded "You Don’t Know Me" as a duet with Luísa Sonza for the latter’s third studio album, Escândalo Íntimo (2023). The new version was released on May 28, 2024, alongside the album’s other previously locked tracks.
