= Caetano Veloso (1969 album) =

Studio album by Caetano Veloso
- Released: 1969
- Genre: Tropicália, MPB, psychedelic rock
- Length: 41:55
- Label: Philips
- Producer: Rogério Duprat

Caetano Veloso chronology
Caetano Veloso (1968)	Caetano Veloso (1969)	Caetano Veloso (1971)

Professional ratings
Review scores
Source	Rating
Allmusic	3/5 stars

Caetano Veloso (also known as Álbum Branco, which means White Album, in Portuguese) is an album released in Brazil in 1969, being the third album by Caetano Veloso, his second solo release.

The album vocals and acoustic guitars were recorded in a small recording studio in Salvador, where Veloso was confined for defying the authoritarian Brazilian government of the time. He recorded the vocals, and Gilberto Gil the acoustic guitar, which were sent to arranger and producer Rogério Duprat, who added layers of electric guitars, horns, bass, drums and other instruments in a more professional studio in São Paulo

The album, like its predecessor, is very eclectic (a characteristic of the Tropicália movement), with songs that vary from Bossa Nova, Psychedelic rock, Carnival music, traditional Bahian music, Fado, Tango, and others. It has songs in Portuguese, Spanish, and English. Its cover and self-titled nature are a reference to the Beatles' famous self-titled album, released a year prior.

The song 'Alfomega' was sampled by MF Doom on the Ghostface Killah track 'Charlie Brown' in 2006.

== Track listing ==
All tracks are written by Caetano Veloso except where noted.

Side one
No.	Title	Length
1.	"Irene"	3:48
2.	"The Empty Boat"	4:15
3.	"Marinheiro Só" (Traditional; Adaptation by Caetano Veloso)	3:29
4.	"Lost in the Paradise"	3:27
5.	"Atrás do Trio Elétrico"	2:45
6.	"Os Argonautas"	2:47

Side two
No.	Title	Length
7.	"Carolina" (Chico Buarque)	2:38
8.	"Cambalache" (Enrique Santos Discépolo)	2:31
9.	"Não Identificado"	4:03
10.	"Chuvas de Verão" (Fernando Lobo)	2:51
11.	"Acrilírico" (Caetano Veloso, Rogério Duarte, Rogério Duprat)	3:01
12.	"Alfômega" (Gilberto Gil)	5:57

== Personnel ==
- Caetano Veloso - vocals
- Gilberto Gil - Violão, vocals on 12
- Lanny Gordin- electric guitar, acoustic guitar [Portuguese guitar]
- Sérgio Barroso - electric bass
- Wilson das Neves - drum set
- Chiquinho de Moraes - piano and organ
- Rogério Duprat - arrangements
