= Sparkle Division =

American electronic music group

Sparkle Division is an American electronic music group composed of composers William Basinski, Preston Wendel, and Gary Thomas Wright.

The album is a concept album centred around two naïve female interns attending a fictional party at a Hollywood estate owned by a prominent drug dealer in the late 60s. Each song charts a notable event or stage of the party, in a loosely chronological order.

== History ==
Sparkle Division grew out of collaborations between ambient/electronic composer William Basinski and Preston Wendel, a recording engineer and composer whom Basinski had initially hired as a studio assistant. The pair collaborated on an electronic, saxophone-heavy album, which was completed in 2016 but not released until 2020. The album, To Feel Embraced, features Henry Grimes playing bass on one track. In 2023, a follow-up, Foxy, was announced, with the group continuing as a trio after adding Gary Thomas Wright as a member.

== Discography ==
- To Feel Embraced (Temporary Residence, 2020)
- Classified EP (Temporary Residence, 2021)
- Foxy (Temporary Residence, 2023)
