= Outras Palavras =

Studio album by Caetano Veloso
- Released: 1981
- Recorded: 1980
- Genre: MPB
- Length: 40:15
- Label: PolyGram, Universal.
- Producer: Caetano Veloso

Caetano Veloso chronology
Cinema Transcendental (1979)	Outras Palavras (1981)	Brasil (1981)

Professional ratings
Review scores
Source	Rating
Allmusic	3/5 stars

Outras Palavras (transl. Other Words) is an album by Brazilian singer and composer Caetano Veloso, released in 1981. The album mixes Brazilian rhythms with genres popular at the time, such as reggae and funk music. The song "Nu com minha música" was covered by Devendra Banhart, Rodrigo Amarante and Marisa Monte on the album Red Hot + Rio 2.

== Track listing ==
All songs by Caetano Veloso except where noted otherwise

No.	Title	Writer(s)	Length
1.	"Outras Palavras"		3:51
2.	"Gema"		2:23
3.	"Vera Gata"		2:32
4.	"Lua e Estrela"	Vinícius Cantuária	3:30
5.	"Sim/Não"	Bolão and Caetano Veloso	3:52
6.	"Nu com minha música."		3:54
7.	"Rapte-me, Camaleoa"		3:54
8.	"Dans mon île"	M. Pon and Henri Salvador.	2:58
9.	"Tem que ser você"		3:43
10.	"Blues"	Péricles Cavalcanti	1:11
11.	"Verdura"	Paulo Leminski	1:01
12.	"Quero um baby seu"	Paulo Zdanowski and Luiz Carlos Siqueira	4:00
13.	"Jeito de corpo"		3:18
