= Transa (Caetano Veloso album) =

Studio album by Caetano Veloso
- Released: 1972
- Genres: MPB, tropicália
- Length: 37:13
- Label: Philips
- Producer: Ralph Mace

Caetano Veloso chronology
Caetano Veloso (1971)	Transa (1972)	Caetano e Chico - juntos e ao vivo (1972)

Transa (Portuguese: [ˈtɾɐ̃zɐ]; transl. Lovemaking) is the sixth album by the Brazilian musician Caetano Veloso, released in 1972 by Philips Records. Like its predecessor, it was recorded while the artist was exiled in London, though he returned to Brazil shortly after completing it.

== Background and recording ==
Exiled in London since 1969, Caetano Veloso gained permission to stay one month in Brazil in January 1971 to see the commemorative mass of his parents 40th anniversary. In Rio de Janeiro, the singer was interrogated by the military who asked him to compose a song complimenting the Transamazônica highway - during its construction. Caetano didn't accept the "proposal", but, back in London, recorded the LP with the title "Transa", released in Brazilian territory in January 1972, when the singer returned to the country for good.

== Reception ==
Professional ratings
Review scores
Source	Rating
AllMusic	4.5/5 stars

Caetano calls it "one of my favorite records", feeling that it reaches a level of musicianship he was unable to achieve on previous albums. It also proved popular with the Brazilian public, due partly to its inclusion of a new version of the old samba "Mora na Filosofia", originally by Monsueto Menezes. It was listed by Rolling Stone Brazil in 2007, as well as the Discoteca Básica podcast in 2022, as one of the 10 best Brazilian albums in history. Its success would set up the failure of the much more unconventional follow-up, Araçá Azul. In August 2016, Pitchfork elected "You Don't Know Me" as the 73rd best song from the seventies. Journalist Kevin Lozano writes:

[in the song] he writes what is probably his purest and most unvarnished expression of the loss he experienced during those years, 'Feel so lonely/The world is spinning around slowly,' he sings. The song floats between Portuguese and English seamlessly, highlighting the essential emotion irrevocably lost in translation. It's a masterpiece of a song that could only be written from the point of a view of an exile.

== Track listing ==
All tracks are written by Caetano Veloso except where noted

Side one
No.	Title	Length
1.	"You Don't Know Me"	3:50
2.	"Nine Out of Ten"	4:55
3.	"Triste Bahia" (Caetano Veloso, Gregório de Matos)	9:32

Side two
No.	Title	Length
4.	"It's a Long Way"	6:05
5.	"Mora na Filosofia" (Monsueto, Arnaldo Passos)	6:16
6.	"Neolithic Man"	4:42
7.	"Nostalgia (That's What Rock'n Roll Is All About)"	1:20

== Personnel ==
Adapted from sources.

- Caetano Veloso - vocals, acoustic guitar
- Gal Costa - vocals on "You Don't Know Me," "Neolithic Man" and "Nostalgia"
- Jards Macalé - electric and acoustic guitars, musical direction and arrangements
- Moacyr Albuquerque - bass
- Tuti Moreno - drums
- Áureo de Sousa - percussion
- Angela Ro Ro - harmonica on "Nostalgia"
