= Moreno Veloso =

Brazilian musician and singer (born 1972)

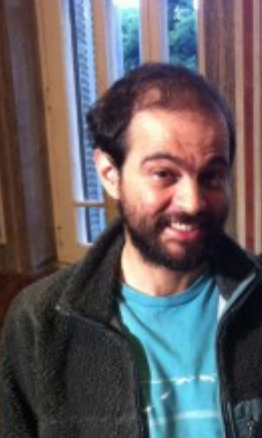
Moreno Veloso in 2014

Moreno Veloso (born November 22, 1972) is a Brazilian musician and singer.

== Early life ==
His parents are Brazilian singer Caetano Veloso and his first wife Idelzuith Gadelha (Dedé) Veloso. Brazilian singer Gal Costa is Moreno Veloso's godmother and his cousins are the famous actress Patrícia Pillar and the singers Luiza Possi, Davi Moraes, Marina Lima and Preta Gil, daughter of his aunt Sandra Gadelha. Since childhood, he lived with Gilberto Gil, his aunt Maria Bethânia and other important names in the arts, especially Brazilian music.

Veloso studied physics at the Federal University of Rio de Janeiro. He turned later to music and singing. In 2000, he recorded his first album, Máquina de Escrever Música (English: Music Typewriter), but his songwriting debut came in 1982 with "Um Canto de Afoxé para o Bloco Do Ilê", a reference to Ilê Aiyê, a carnival bloco from Salvador, Bahia.

In 1998, Veloso collaborated with Sadjo Djolo Koiate on the track "Coral" for the AIDS benefit compilation album Onda Sonora: Red Hot + Lisbon produced by the Red Hot Organization.

Again in 2011, he contributed to the song "Águas de Março" that featured ATOM™ Toshiyuki Yasuda and Fernanda Takai for the Red Hot Organization's charitable album Red Hot+Rio 2. The album is a follow-up to the 1996, Red Hot + Rio. Proceeds from the sales were donated to raise awareness and money to fight AIDS/HIV and related health and social issues.

One of Moreno Veloso's music groups is called Moreno + 2, including Moreno Veloso, Alexandre Kassin and Domênico Lancelotti.

== Partial discography ==
- Moreno+2: Máquina de Escrever Música (2000, ROCKiT!)
  - Released by Luaka Bop first as Moreno Veloso+2: Music Typewriter (2001)
- Domenico+2: Sincerely Hot (2003, Luaka Bop)
- Kassin+2: Futurismo (2007, Luaka Bop)
- Moreno Veloso: Coisa Boa (2014, Disco Maravilha)
