= Maria Bethânia =

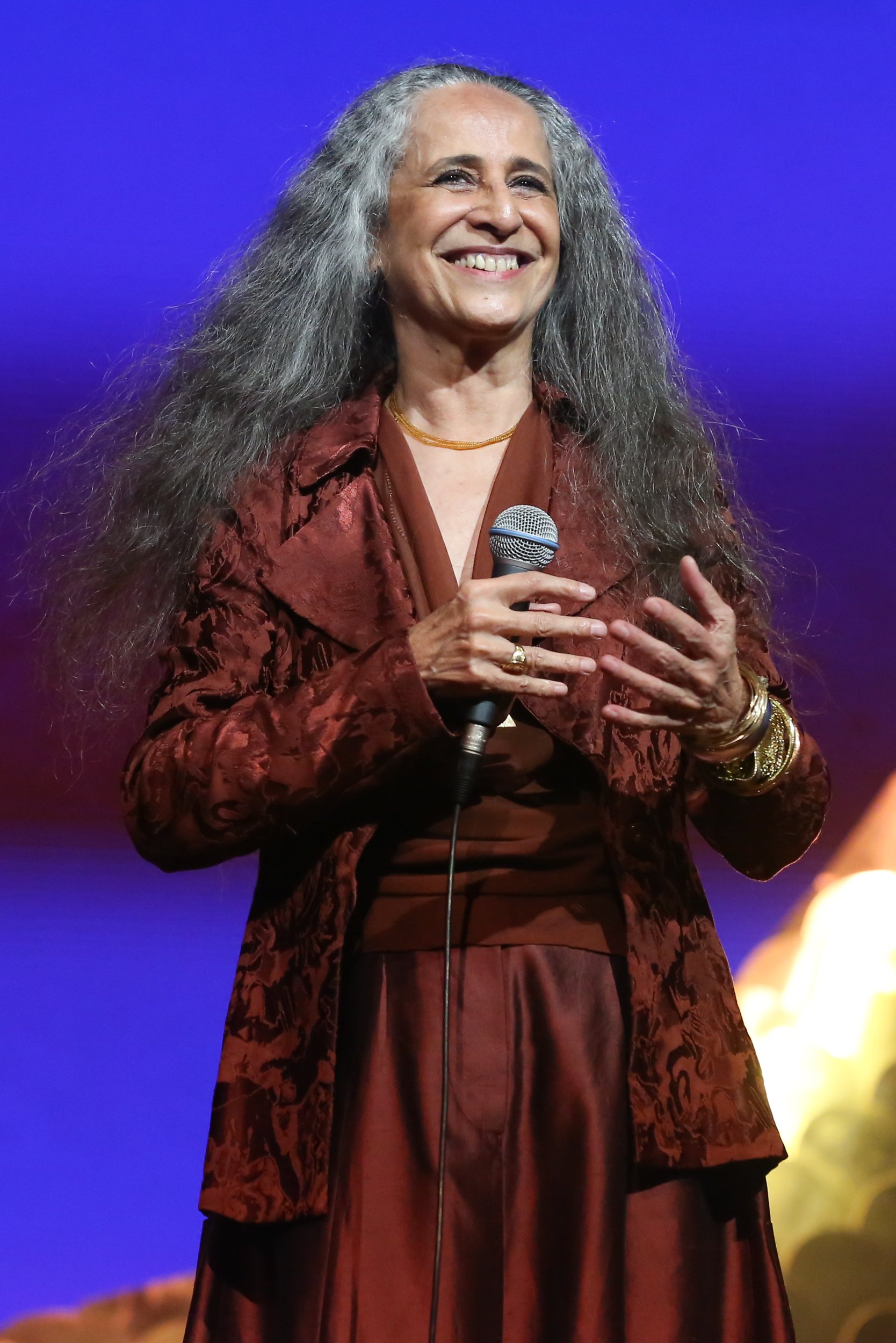
- Bethânia in 2014
- Born: Maria Bethânia Viana Teles Veloso; 18 June 1946 (age 80); Santo Amaro, Bahia, Brazil
- Occupations: Singer; songwriter
- Years active: 1965–present
- Mother: Dona Canô
- Relatives: Caetano Veloso (brother)
- Musical career
- Genres: Bossa nova; MPB; samba
- Instruments: Vocals
- Labels: RCA; Universal; Verve; EMI; Biscoito Fino; Wrasse; Sony BMG
- Website: mariabethania.com.br

Maria Bethânia Viana Teles Veloso (Portuguese pronunciation: [maˈɾiɐ beˈtɐ̃niɐ]; born 18 June 1946) is a Brazilian singer and songwriter. Born in Santo Amaro, Bahia, she started her career in Rio de Janeiro in 1964 with the show "Opinião" ("Opinion"). Due to its popularity, with performances all over the country, and the popularity of her 1965 single "Carcará", the artist became a star in Brazil. She is the most awarded artist in the history of the Brazilian Music Awards.

Bethânia is the sister of the singer-songwriter Caetano Veloso and of the writer-songwriter Mabel Velloso, as well as being aunt of the singers Belô Velloso and Jota Velloso. The singer has released 50 studio albums in 47 years of career, and is among the 10 best-selling music artists in Brazil, having sold more than 26 million records. Bethânia was ranked in 2012, by Rolling Stone Brasil magazine, as the fifth-biggest voice in Brazilian music.

== Early life and initial artistic activities ==
Bethânia is the sixth of eight children born into the family of José Telles Veloso (Seu Zeca), a government official, and Claudionor Viana Telles Veloso (Dona Canô), a housewife.

The name Maria Bethânia was chosen by her brother Caetano Veloso after the homonymous hit song written by composer Capiba and famous at the time in the voice of Nélson Gonçalves.

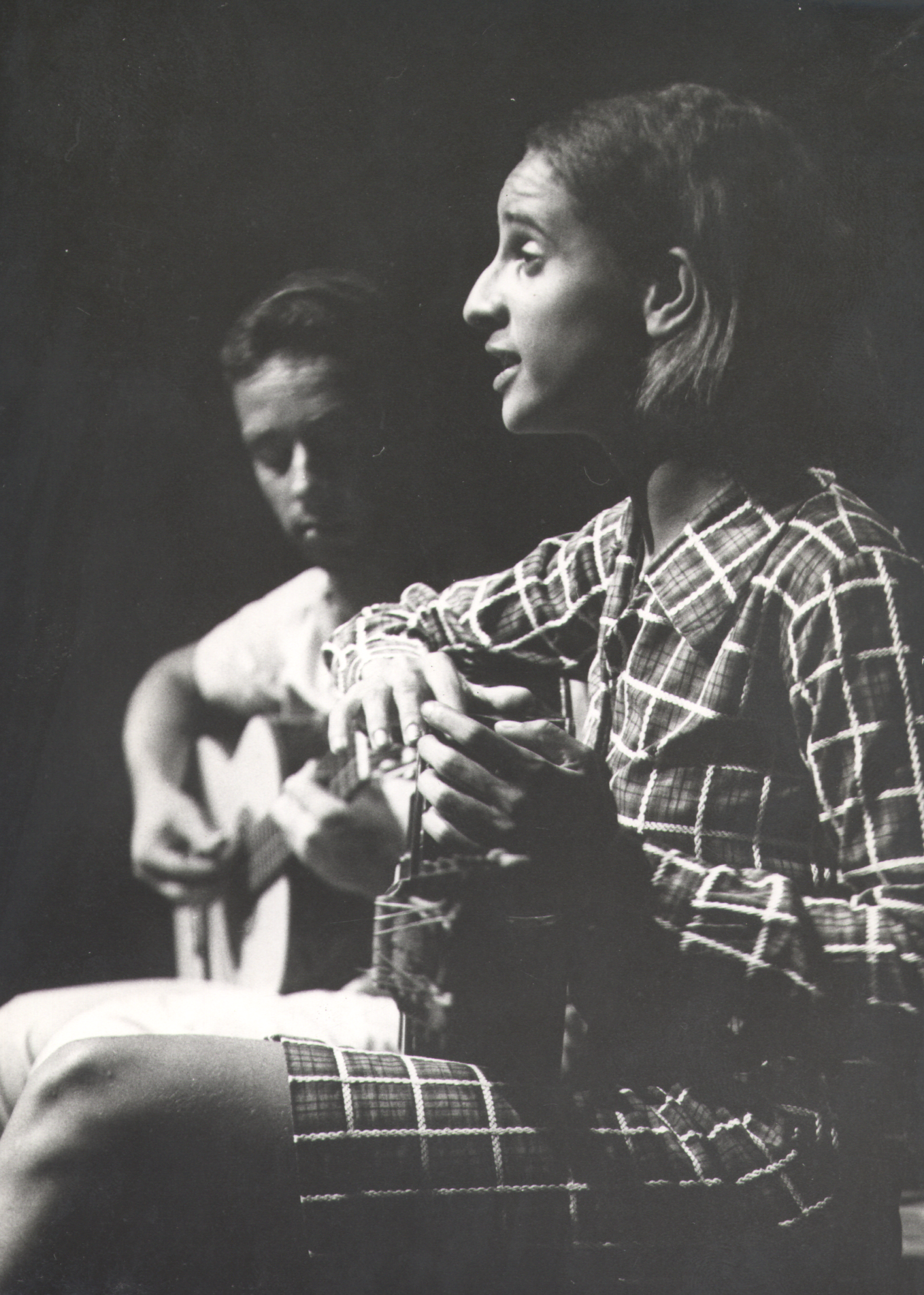
Maria Bethania, 1965. National Archives of Brazil.

In her childhood, she had aspirations to become an actress. However, her mother was a musician, so music was prevalent in the Veloso household. Though Bethânia was born in Santo Amaro da Purifição, her family moved to Salvador, Bahia when she was 13. The move allowed her to experience the bohemian, intellectual circles of the city, as well as to visit theaters. When she was 16, her brother Caetano Veloso invited her to sing in a film for which he was producing the soundtrack, but she refused. Nevertheless, the film's director, Álvaro Guimarães, liked her voice and invited the young musician to perform in the 1963 Nélson Rodrigues's musical Boca de Ouro. This time Bethânia accepted, and for the first time in her life she went on stage to sing for an audience, opening the play performing a samba by Ataulfo Alves.

That same year, Bethânia and her sister met singers Gilberto Gil and Gal Costa; Caetano had been invited to put on an MPB show to inaugurate the Teatro Vila Velha. The four artists got together and, in 1964, staged Nós, por exemplo (We, for example).

The show was a success and was presented again twenty months later, with the participation of singer-songwriter Tom Zé. That same year, the group mounted another show called Nova Bossa Velha e Velha Bossa Nova (New Old Bossa and Old New Bossa). Still in that year, directed by Caetano and Gil, Bethânia performed another musical, this time on her own, called Mora na Filosofia (Lives in Philosophy).

She began performing again with her brother, as well as Gilberto Gil, Gal Costa, and Tom Zé, at the opening of the Vila Velha Theater in the next year. During one of these performances, the bossa nova musician Nara Leão offered her an opportunity to take her place in a series of performances titled "Opinião".

== Career ==
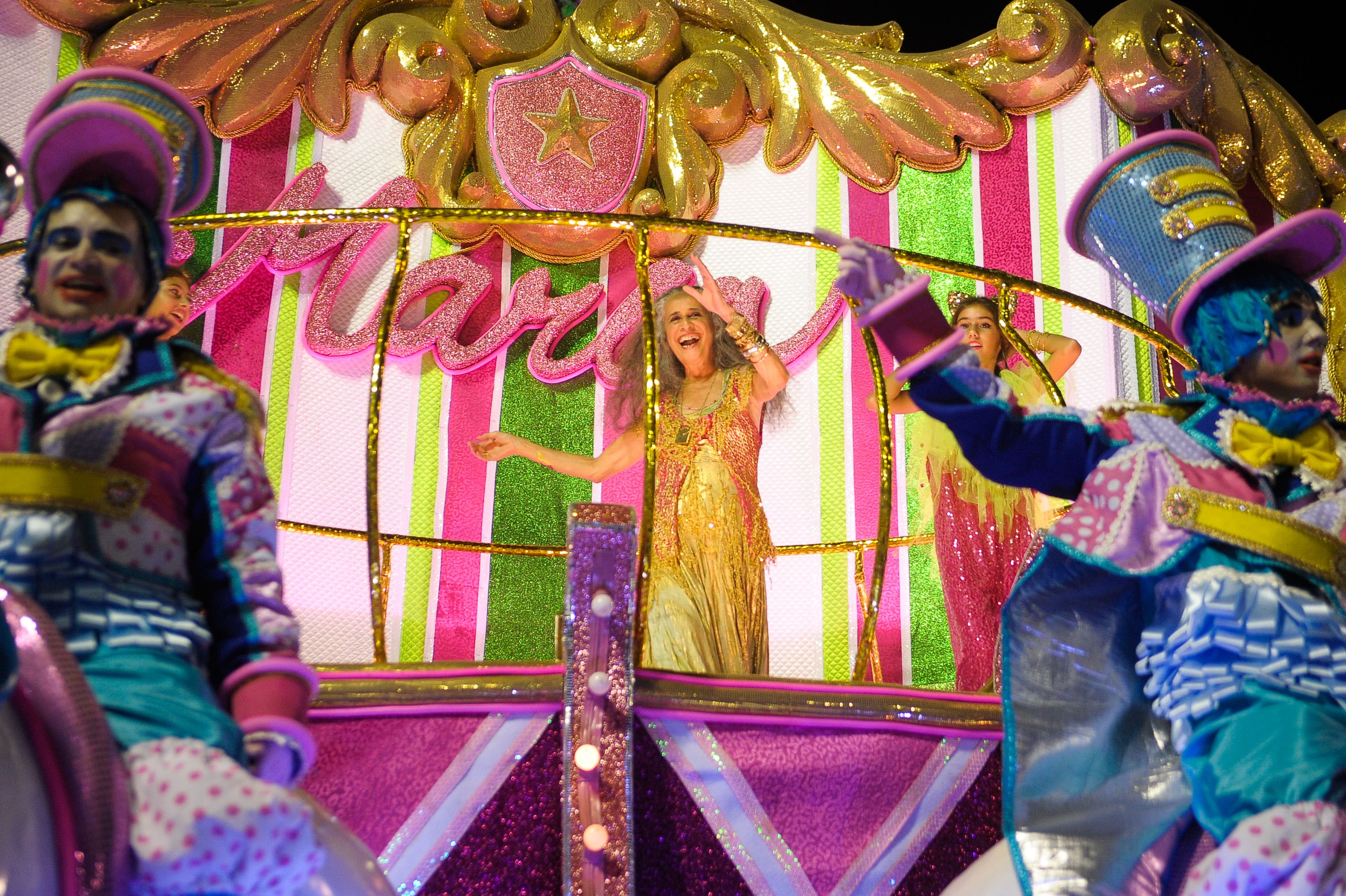
Maria Bethânia parades for Mangueira at the carnival of 2016.

She released her first single, a protest song called "Carcará", in 1965, the same year that her brother released his first recording. After releasing "Carcará" Bethânia returned from Rio de Janeiro, where she had gone to attend college, to Bahia. This was to only be a brief visit, as around that time she was performing at nightclubs and other venues throughout Brazil. This song also got her an offer from an RCA Records representative to record for the company. However, Bethânia continually changed record labels throughout the 1970s. In 1973 Bethânia released Drama, Luz Da Noite, in which she performed traditional Brazilian songs, as well as incorporating literary elements. In 1977, Bethânia went on tour and released a gold-certified album, both with the name of Pássaro da Manhã. A year later, she released Álibi, which was also gold-certified with over a million copies sold. Around the end of the 1970s, Bethânia became more artistically conservative, moving away from the Tropicalismo music her frequent collaborators, including Caetano Veloso and Gilberto Gil, had been playing. During the 1980s and '90s Bethânia continued to record and perform, with 1993's As Canções Que Você Fez Para Mim becoming the year's most successful album in Brazil.

In 1976, she released a live album with Doces Bárbaros, a Música popular brasileira supergroup. It was recorded June 24 of that year at Anhembi Stadium in São Paulo. Its members were Gilberto Gil, Caetano Veloso, Maria Bethânia and Gal Costa, four of the biggest names in the history of the Music of Brazil. The band was the subject of a 1977 documentary directed by Jom Tob Azulay. In 1994, they performed a tribute concert to Mangueira school of samba.

French filmmaker Georges Gachot completed a documentary film "Musica é perfume" about her, which was worldwide distributed. In 2008, she recorded an album with the Cuban singer Omara Portuondo which was followed by a Live DVD

In 2015, her album Meus Quintais was nominated for the 16th Latin Grammy Awards in the Best MPB Album category.

== Controversy ==
In March 2011, Bethânia found herself in the midst of a controversy after receiving permission from the Ministry of Culture of Brazil to make a poetry blog budgeted for $1.3 million tax-free Reais ($783,000 USD).

The financing of the project would fall under the so-called Lei Rouanet (English: Rouanet Law), which is designed as an incentive to promote Brazilian culture. The law allows companies and individuals to invest part of their income tax in cultural projects.

The singer, considered one of the greats in Brazilian music and who has a track record of working with poets and reading bits of her favorite poetry, would use the platform to interpret poetry, both of her own and from other authors, in song through a daily series of videos, 365 in total, for the blog O Mundo Precisa de Poesia (English: The World Needs Poetry).

Much of the criticisms surrounds on the project's cost and the fact that a rich and well-known artist like Bethânia can rely on such a process to get sponsored, while hundreds of other minor artists cannot find ways to survive. Pablo Villaça, from the blog Cinema em Cena (Movie Theater at Home) estimated that, taking out the amount that would go to the collectors, around R$1.17 million would go toward the blog's production. Each video, then, would cost about R$3,200. He stated that this cost would not be compatible with videos of 3–5 minutes length consisting of just one person reciting poetry.

Blogger, journalist and filmmaker Mauricio Caleiro explained that this process, appropriated by the interests of big names and governed by the market, has suffered from great distortions over the years, favoring respected names over beginners, according to him:

"(…) the imbroglio involving the baiana singer revealed the problems of the “Rouanet Law”, a tool that, shortly after being created, played a key role in the survival of certain artistic areas during the neoliberal autumn, but as the episode in question shows, it eventually lead to serious distortions in relations between economy, ideology and cultural production."

To mock the whole situation, a satirical blog entitled Bethania: 1 million reasons for you to access was created by blogger Raphael Quatroci.

On March 16, the Ministry of Culture released a statement affirming the legality of the process and reiterating that the approval had strictly followed the rules. It said that "the criteria in the CNIC (National Commission on Cultural Incentives) are technical and legal, so to reject an applicant because she/he is famous, or not, would set up obvious and untenable discrimination."

Then, on March 27, Caetano Veloso, Bethânia's brother, came out to defend his sister, noting that other projects by many other artists, both known and unknown, were authorized to raise larger amounts.

== Personal life ==
She moved to Rio de Janeiro alone, at age 17, in 1963, where she lives today. Very discreet, she is not often seen in social events. The singer does not have children. She is an adherent of the Afro-Brazilian religion Candomblé.

In 2017, Bethânia began a relationship with stylist Gilda Midani, whom she married in 2022. The couple divorced in 2025 but maintain a professional partnership.

== Filmography ==
=== Motion pictures ===
- O desafio, de Paulo Cezar Saraceni ("É de manhã" de Caetano Veloso; "Eu vivo num tempo de guerra" de Edu Lobo e Gianfrancesco Guarnieri; "Carcará" de João do Vale e José Cândido, com Zé Keti e João do Vale; "Notícia de jornal")
- Garota de Ipanema
- O homem que comprou o mundo
- Quando o carnaval chegar

=== Documentaries ===
- Improvisiert und Zielbewusst / Cinema Novo, ("Só me fez bem")
- Enredando sombras (segmento Cinema Novo)
- Além-mar
- Saravah
- Certas palavras com Chico Buarque
- Brasil
- Chico e as cidades
- Biblioteca Mindlin - Um mundo em páginas
- O ovo
- Vinicius - Quem pagará o enterro e as flores se eu me morrer de amores
- O sonho acabou [Phono 73 - O canto de um povo]
- Viva volta
- Maria Bethânia: Music Is Perfume

=== Short films ===
- A Última Ceia segundo Ziraldo

== Tours ==
- Nós, por exemplo (1964)
- Nova bossa velha, velha bossa nova (1964)
- Mora na Filosofia (1964)
- Opinião (1965)
- Arena canta Bahia (1966)
- Tempo de Guerra (1966)
- Pois é (1966)
- Recital na Boite Cangaceiro (1966)
- Recital na Boite Barroco (1968)
- Yes, nós temos Maria Bethânia (1968)
- Comigo me desavim (1968)
- Recital na Boite Blow Up (1969)
- Brasileiro, Profissão Esperança (1970)
- Rosa dos Ventos (1971)
- Drama - Luz da noite (1973)
- A cena muda (1974)
- Chico & Bethânia (1975)
- Os Doces Bárbaros (1976)
- Pássaro da manhã (1977)
- Maria Bethânia e Caetano Veloso (1978)
- Maria Bethânia (1979)
- Mel (1980)
- Estranha forma de vida (1981)
- Nossos momentos (1982)
- A hora da estrela (1984)
- 20 anos (1985)
- Maria (1988)
- Dadaya - As sete moradas (1989)
- 25 anos (1990)
- As canções que você fez pra mim (1994)
- Âmbar - Imitação da vida (1996)
- A força que nunca seca (1999)
- Maricotinha (2001)
- Brasileirinho (2004)
- Tempo, tempo, tempo, tempo (2005)
- Dentro do mar tem rio (2006)
- Omara Portuondo e Maria Bethânia (2008)
- Amor, Festa, Devoção (2009/2010)
- Bethânia e as Palavras (2009/2011/2012)
- Maria Bethânia canta Chico Buarque (2011/2012)
- Carta de Amor (2012/2013)
- Abraçar e Agradecer (2015)
- Show de Rua - Sucessos (2016-2017)
- De Santo Amaro a Xerém - Maria Bethânia e Zeca Pagodinho (2018)

== See also ==
- List of best-selling Latin music artists
