= Caetano Veloso =

Brazilian composer and singer (born 1942)

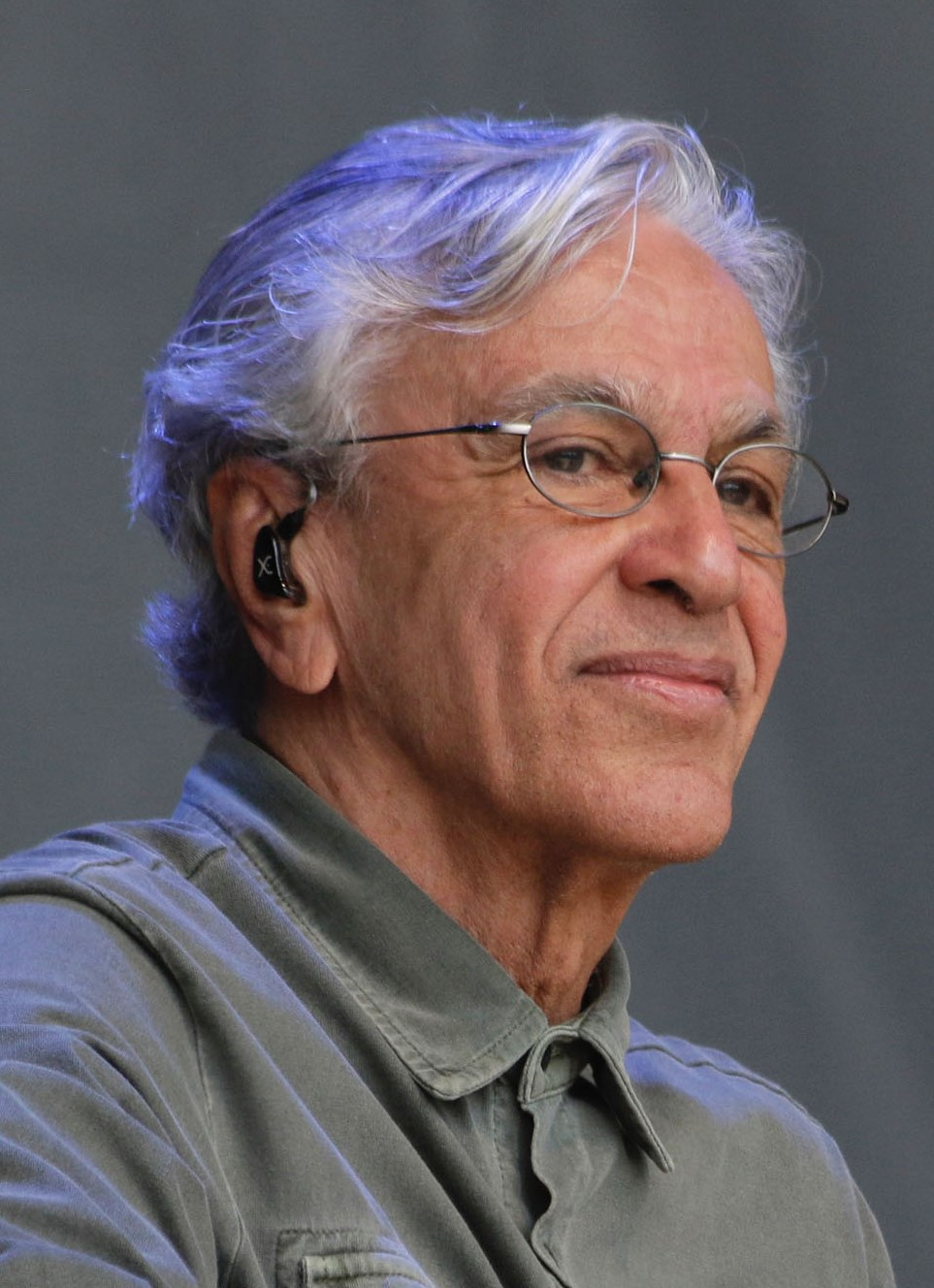
- Veloso in 2019
- Born: Caetano Emanuel Viana Teles Veloso; 7 August 1942 (age 84); Santo Amaro, Bahia, Brazil
- Occupations: Singer-songwriter; writer; political activist
- Years active: 1961–present
- Spouse: Andrea Gadelha (m. 1967; div. 1983) Paula Lavigne (m. 1986; div. 2004)
- Children: 4; including Moreno and Zeca
- Mother: Dona Canô
- Relatives: Maria Bethânia (sister)
- Musical career
- Genres: MPB; samba; bossa nova; tropicália; folk rock
- Instruments: Vocals; guitar
- Labels: RCA Victor; Universal Music
- Website: caetanoveloso.com.br

Signature
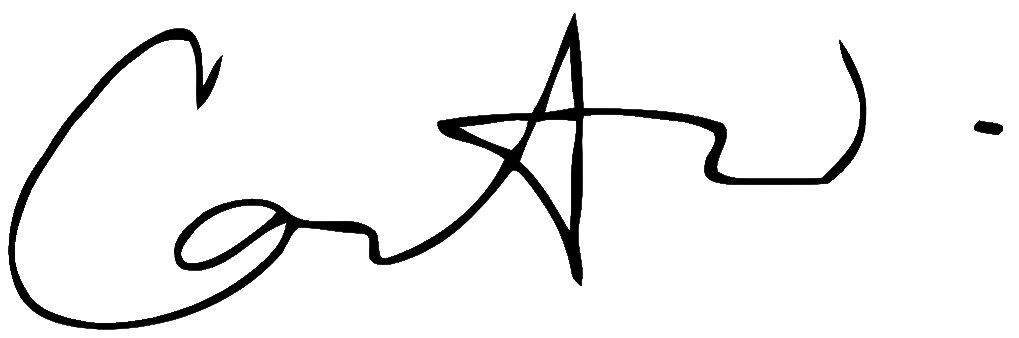

Caetano Emanuel Viana Teles Veloso (Brazilian Portuguese: [kajˈtɐnu emɐnuˈɛw viˈɐnɐ ˈtɛliz veˈlozu]; born 7 August 1942) is a Brazilian singer-songwriter, musician, writer, and political activist. In the late 1960s, he helped develop Tropicália, a Brazilian musical movement that combined Brazilian popular music with rock and roll and avant-garde influences. Along with Gilberto Gil, Gal Costa, Tom Zé, and Os Mutantes, he participated in the 1968 collaborative album Tropicália: ou Panis et Circencis, which became a musical manifesto of the movement.

Veloso's anti-authoritarian political stance brought him into conflict with the Brazilian military dictatorship, which censored and banned some of his songs. He and Gil were arrested and eventually released on condition that they leave Brazil. They lived in exile in London before Veloso returned to Brazil in 1972. His subsequent work combined international musical styles with Brazilian folkloric traditions, and his popularity expanded outside Brazil during the 1980s.

Veloso has continued to record and perform internationally. He has received nine Latin Grammy Awards and two Grammy Awards, and in 2012 was named the Latin Recording Academy Person of the Year.

== Biography ==
"O Leãozinho"
A 19-second sample of "O Leãozinho", a song recorded relatively early in Veloso's career.

Veloso was born in Santo Amaro da Purificação, Bahia, Brazil, the fifth of seven children of José Teles Veloso (1901–1983) and Claudionor Viana Teles Veloso (1907–2012). His childhood was influenced greatly by artistic endeavors: he was interested in both literature and filmmaking as a child, but focused mainly on music. The musical style of bossa nova and João Gilberto, one of its most prominent exponents, were major influences on Veloso's music as he grew up. Veloso was 17 years old when he first heard Gilberto, whom he describes as his "supreme master". He recognizes Gilberto's contribution to Brazilian music as new—"illuminating" the tradition of Brazilian music and paving the way for future innovation. Veloso moved to the Bahian port city of Salvador as a teenager, the city in which Gilberto lived, and a center of Afro-Brazilian culture and music.

In 1965, Veloso moved again to Rio de Janeiro, with his sister Maria Bethânia, also a musician. Shortly after the move, Veloso won a lyrics contest for his composition "Um Dia" and was signed to Philips Records. On 21 October 1967, Veloso won fourth prize and gained a standing ovation at the third annual Brazil Popular Music Festival with his song "Alegria, Alegria". on which he was backed by São Paulo group Beat Boys; along with the performance of his friend Gilberto Gil, who was backed by psychedelic band Os Mutantes, this marked the first time that rock bands had performed at the festival. During this period, Veloso, Bethânia, Gilberto Gil, Gal Costa, Tom Zé, and Os Mutantes developed "Tropicalismo", which fused Brazilian pop with rock and roll and avant-garde music. Veloso describes the movement as a wish to be different - not "defensive" like the right-wing Brazilian military government, which vehemently opposed the movement. Although Gil and Veloso's performances at the 1967 MBP Festival were rapturously received, within a year, Tropicalismo had become a deeply divisive issue among Brazil's youth audience, with Marxist-influenced college students of the Brazilian left wing condemning Tropicalismo, because they believed it commercialized Brazilian traditional music by incorporating musical influence from other cultures, specifically the United States.

The musical manifesto of the Tropicalist movement was the landmark collaborative LP Tropicália: ou Panis et Circencis ("Tropicalia: or Bread and Circuses"), issued in mid-1968, which brought together the talents of Veloso, Os Mutantes, Gilberto Gil, Tom Zé and Gal Costa, with arrangements by avant-garde composer-arranger Rogerio Duprat (who had studied with Pierre Boulez) and lyrical contributions from poet Torquato Neto. The album's group cover photograph depicted the collective holding a variety of objects and images, in a deliberate reference to the cover of The Beatles' Sgt. Pepper's Lonely Hearts Club Band.

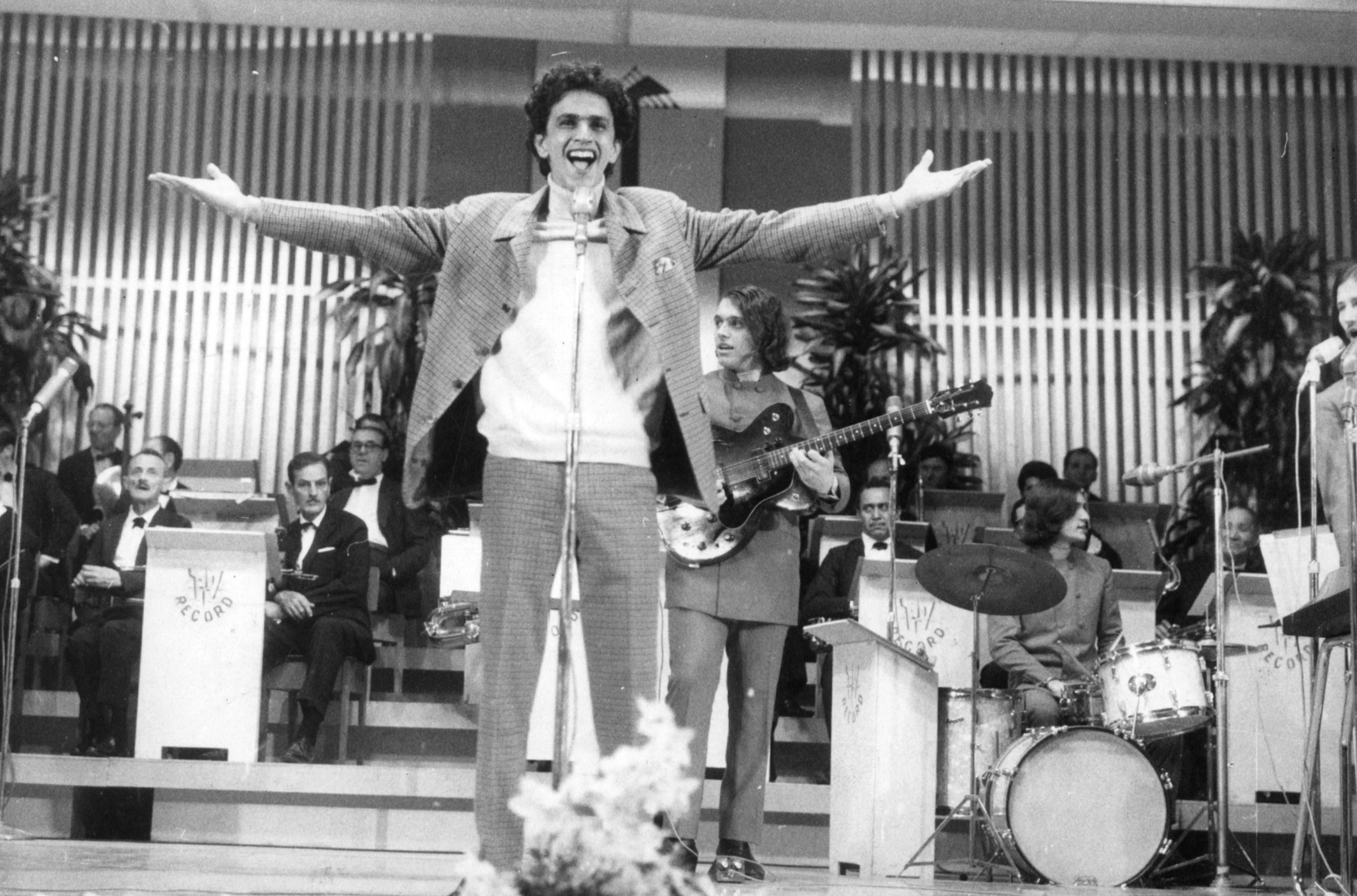
Caetano Veloso at the III Popular Music Festival, 1967. National Archives of Brazil.

The tensions between the Tropicalistas and the student left peaked in September 1968 with Veloso's now-legendary performances at the third annual International Song Festival, held at the Catholic University in Rio, where the audience included a large contingent of students who were vehemently opposed to the Tropicalistas. When Veloso (backed by Os Mutantes) performed in the first round of the Festival's song competition on 12 September, he was initially greeted with enthusiastic applause, but the situation soon turned ugly. Dressed in a shiny green plastic suit, festooned with electrical wires and necklaces strung with animal teeth, Veloso provoked the students with his lurid costume, his sensual body movements and his startling new psychedelic music, and the performers were soon being bombarded with loud insults, jeers and boos from the students, who became even more incensed when American pop singer John Dandurand made a surprise appearance on stage during the song.

The ideological conflict climaxed three days later on 15 September when Veloso returned for the second round of the competition, performing a specially-written new song entitled "É Proibido Proibir" ("It is Forbidden to Forbid"). The leftist students began hissing and booing as soon as Veloso's name was announced, and when he began his performance, his overtly sexual stage moves and the experimental music of Os Mutantes again provoked a wild reaction – the students began booing so loudly that the performers could barely be heard, and a section of the crowd then stood up and turned their backs to the stage, prompting Os Mutantes to turn their backs on the audience. As the performance continued, the students pelted the stage with fruit, vegetables, eggs, paper balls and anything else that came to hand. Veloso then stopped singing and launched into an impassioned monologue, in which he excoriated the students for their conservatism. After being joined by Gilberto Gil, who came on stage to show his support, Veloso finished his diatribe by telling the students "...if you are the same in politics as you are in aesthetics, we're done for!" and declaring he would no longer compete in music festivals. He then deliberately finished the song out of tune, angrily shouted "Enough!" and walked off arm-in-arm with Gil and Os Mutantes. A studio version of the song was later released as a single, and the closing section of the tumultuous live performance featuring Veloso's speech, was issued as the single's B-side. Even though Tropicalismo was controversial among traditional critics, it introduced to Música popular brasileira new elements for making music with an eclectic style.

Veloso studied philosophy at the Universidade Federal da Bahia, which influenced both his artistic expression and viewpoint on life. Among his favorite philosophers were Jean-Paul Sartre, Martin Heidegger, and Herbert Marcuse. Veloso's anti-authoritarian political stance earned him the enmity of Brazil's military dictatorship which ruled until 1985; his songs were frequently censored and some banned.

=== Imprisonment and exile ===
In October 1968, Caetano Veloso and Gilberto Gil performed at Sucata club in Rio de Janeiro, with Hélio Oiticica's poem-flag Seja marginal, seja herói displayed on stage. The journalist Randal Juliano of RecordTV propagated a story that Caetano and Gil had sung the Brazilian National Anthem in subversive parody. The two musicians were arrested without trial 27 December 1968—shortly after the military state had passed on 13 December Institutional Act Number Five, which suspended habeas corpus. On 23 January 1969, Veloso underwent interrogation by Major Hilton Justino Ferreira, who asked Caetano whether he had sung the national anthem of Brazil to the melody of "Tropicália," to which Caetano responded that it would be impossible because the verses of the Brazilian anthem are decasyllable and the verses of "Tropicalia" only have eight poetic syllables.

Veloso and Gil were both arrested in February 1969 and held in prison for three months, followed by a further four months under house arrest; they were eventually released on condition that they leave the country, and spent the next few years in exile. He said that "they didn't imprison us for any song or any particular thing that we said," ascribing the government's reaction to its unfamiliarity with the cultural phenomenon of Tropicália—they seemed to say "We might as well put them in prison." The federal police detained the two and flew them to an unknown destination. Finally, Veloso and Gil lived out their exile in London, England. When Caetano was asked about his experience there he says, "London felt dark, and I felt far away from myself." Nevertheless, the two improved their music there and were asked to make a musical production with the producer Ralph Mace.

== Career ==
=== Musical career (1972–present) ===
Veloso's work upon his return in 1972 was often characterized by frequent merging not only of international styles but of Brazilian folkloric styles and rhythms as well. His popularity grew outside Brazil in the 1980s, especially in Greece, Portugal, France, and Africa. His records released in the United States, such as Estrangeiro, helped gain him a larger audience.

Caetano in 80s

To celebrate 25 years of Tropicalismo, Veloso and Gilberto Gil released a CD called Tropicalia 2 in 1993. One song, "Haiti", attracted people's attention during the time, especially because it included powerful statements about sociopolitical issues present in Haiti and also in Brazil. Issues addressed in the song included ethnicity, poverty, homelessness, and capital corruption in the AIDS pandemic. By 2004, he was one of the most respected and prolific international pop stars, with more than 50 recordings available including songs in film soundtracks of Michelangelo Antonioni's Eros, Pedro Almodóvar's Hable con ella, and Frida, for which he performed at the 75th Academy Awards but did not win. In 2002 Veloso published an account of his early years and the Tropicalismo movement, Tropical Truth: A Story of Music and Revolution in Brazil.

His first all-English CD was A Foreign Sound (2004), which covers Nirvana's "Come as You Are" and compositions from the Great American Songbook such as "Carioca" (music by Vincent Youmans and lyrics by Edward Eliscu and Gus Kahn), "Always" (music and lyrics by Irving Berlin), "Manhattan" (music by Richard Rodgers and lyrics by Lorenz Hart), "Love for Sale" (music and lyrics by Cole Porter), and "Something Good" (music and lyrics by Richard Rodgers). Six of the seven songs on his third eponymous album, released in 1971, were also in English.

Veloso has contributed songs to two AIDS benefit compilation albums produced by the Red Hot Organization: Red Hot + Rio (1996) and Onda Sonora: Red Hot + Lisbon (1998).

In 2011, he again contributed two songs to the Red Hot Organization's most recent compilation album, Red Hot + Rio 2. The two tracks include a remix of "Terra" by Prefuse 73 ("3 Mellotrons in a Quiet Room Version") and "Dreamworld: Marco de Canaveses", in collaboration with David Byrne.

His September 2006 album, Cê, was released by Nonesuch Records in the United States. It won two Latin Grammy Awards, one for best singer-songwriter and one for Best Portuguese Song, "Não Me Arrependo".

With a total of nine Latin Grammy Awards and two Grammy Awards, Veloso has received more than any other Brazilian performer. On 14 November, 2012, Veloso was also honored as the Latin Recording Academy Person of the Year.

Veloso has been called "one of the greatest songwriters of the century" and "a pop musician/poet/filmmaker/political activist whose stature in the pantheon of international pop musicians is on par with that of Bob Dylan, Bob Marley, and Lennon/McCartney".

In January 2016, Caetano Veloso was a featured artist at the convention of the Modern Language Association (MLA), in Austin, Texas. Before a SRO crowd, he was interviewed on stage by two luminaries in the field of poetry and poetics, Marjorie Perloff (emerita Stanford) and Roland Greene (Stanford, President of MLA at the time). Most of the discussion concerned music, from rock 'n' roll and samba to experimental composition. Videos of the event should be posted at MLA's site and the Stanford Arcade site. He also performed "Isto aqui, o que é?" at the 2016 Summer Olympics opening ceremony along with singers Anitta and Gilberto Gil after the parade of delegations in August 2016.

In May 2018, Veloso performed at the Grand Final of the 2018 Eurovision Song Contest in the Portuguese capital, Lisbon, alongside 2017 winner Salvador Sobral. His live album Ofertório (Ao Vivo) (recorded with his sons Moreno, Zeca and Tom) was ranked as the 25th best Brazilian album of 2018 by the Brazilian edition of Rolling Stone magazine.

In 2018, Veloso participated in Stefano Bollani album Que Bom with two songs: "La nebbia a Napoli" and "Michelangelo Antonioni".

In 2023, Rolling Stone ranked Veloso at number 108 on its list of the 200 Greatest Singers of All Time.

== Personal life ==
Veloso married fellow Baiana and actress Andrea Gadelha (or Dedé) on 21 November 1967, in a ceremony that reflected the style of the counterculture era. Their son Moreno was born on 22 November 1972. On 7 January 1979, their daughter Júlia was born 3 months premature; she died 11 days later. Veloso separated from Dedé Veloso in 1983. In 1986 Veloso married Rio native Paula Lavigne, with whom he had two more sons, Zeca Lavigne Veloso, born 7 March 1992, and Tom Lavigne Veloso, born on 25 January 1997, in Salvador. Paula confirmed to Playboy magazine in 1998 that, "[Paula] was 13 years old when she lost her virginity to the musician, who was 40 years old at the time." Caetano has since been accused of pedophilia, as having sex with Paula would be considered statutory rape. This marriage lasted twenty years. After their separation in 2004, the two still worked together. In 2016, the couple reunited. Veloso's 1989 CD Estrangeiro includes songs ("Esse Amor", which means "This Love", and "Branquinha") inspired by and dedicated to, respectively, his ex-wife Dedé and his wife at the time, Paula Lavigne.

Veloso is one of the few public atheist celebrities in Brazil. He was brought up in a religious Catholic family but left the faith early on. In an interview Veloso stated that he did not like to "lie to his own intelligence" by believing in God. In a separate interview Veloso generated controversy when he said that Brazil would be better off if most people in the country were to become irreligious or atheist. Despite this, two of Veloso's sons have become members of the neo-Pentecostal Universal Church of the Kingdom of God, with Veloso attending his children's baptism, stating that "what is good for them is good for me."

In 2022 Veloso talked about his bisexuality in a show commemorating his 80th birthday.

== Musical style ==
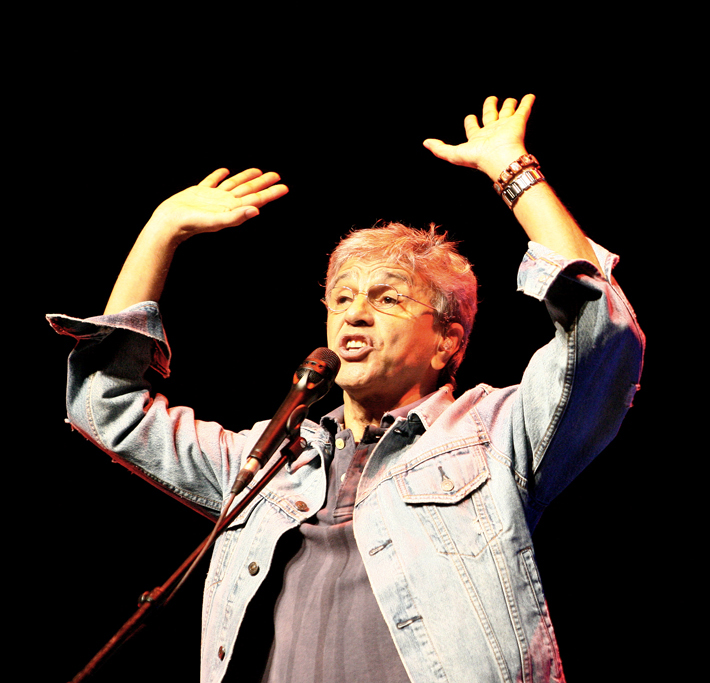
Veloso performs in Lisbon, Portugal in 2007.

Veloso's home, Bahia, has had a decisive role in his music. He praises Bahia for its importance in Brazil's colonial period—when the Portuguese first came—as well as for Bahia's contribution to Brazilian music. He has cited among his musical influences Amália Rodrigues, Cole Porter, the Rolling Stones 1969 tour, and above all, João Gilberto.

Veloso says that he is unable to make a comparison between his musical style in the 1960s, at the height of Tropicália, and his current work. He does note, however, that he has been able to accomplish music of a higher quality later in his career; that he is "better at everything."

== Discography ==
=== Studio albums ===
- 1967: Domingo
- 1968: Caetano Veloso
- 1968: Tropicália: ou Panis et Circenses
- 1968: Veloso, Gil e Bethânia
- 1969: Caetano Veloso
- 1971: Caetano Veloso
- 1972: Transa
- 1972: Araçá Azul
- 1975: Qualquer Coisa
- 1975: Jóia
- 1977: Caetano... muitos carnavais...
- 1977: Bicho
- 1978: Muito
- 1979: Cinema Transcendental
- 1981: Outras Palavras
- 1981: Brasil (João Gilberto album featuring Caetano Veloso, Gilberto Gil and Maria Bethânia)
- 1982: Cores, Nomes
- 1983: Uns
- 1984: Velô
- 1985: Caetanear
- 1986: Caetano Veloso
- 1987: Caetano
- 1989: Estrangeiro
- 1991: Circuladô
- 1993: Tropicália 2 (with Gilberto Gil)
- 1994: Fina Estampa
- 1998: Livro
- 2000: Noites do Norte
- 2002: Eu Não Peço Desculpa (with Jorge Mautner)
- 2004: A Foreign Sound
- 2005: Onqotô
- 2006: Cê
- 2008: Caetano Veloso e Roberto Carlos – e a Música de Tom Jobim
- 2009: Zii e Zie
- 2012: Abraçaço
- 2021: Meu Coco

=== Live albums ===
- 1968: Ao Vivo (with Os Mutantes)
- 1972: Barra 69 ao Vivo na Bahia (with Gilberto Gil)
- 1972: Caetano e Chico – juntos e ao vivo (with Chico Buarque)
- 1974: Temporada de Verão – Ao Vivo na Bahia (with Gal Costa and Gilberto Gil)
- 1976: Doces Bárbaros (with Gal Costa, Gilberto Gil, and Maria Bethânia)
- 1977: Bicho Baile Show (with Banda Black Rio)
- 1978: Maria Bethânia e Caetano Veloso ao Vivo (with Maria Bethânia)
- 1986: Totalmente Demais
- 1992: Circuladô Vivo
- 1994: Fina Estampa ao Vivo
- 1999: Prenda Minha
- 1999: Omaggio a Federico e Giulietta
- 2001: Noites do Norte ao Vivo
- 2002: Live in Bahia
- 2007: Cê ao Vivo
- 2008: "Roberto Carlos e Caetano Veloso e a Música de Tom Jobim"
- 2011: MTV ao Vivo – Caetano – Zii e Zie
- 2011: Caetano e Maria Gadú Multishow ao Vivo (with Maria Gadú)
- 2012: Live at Carnegie Hall (recorded in 2004 with David Byrne)
- 2013: Abraçaço ao Vivo
- 2016: Dois Amigos (Caetano Veloso and Gilberto Gil)
- 2018: Ofertorio
- 2020: Caetano Veloso & Ivan Sacerdote
- 2025: Caetano e Bethânia Ao Vivo (with Maria Bethânia)

=== Soundtracks ===
- 1995: O Quatrilho
- 1996: Tieta of Agreste
- 1999: Orfeu
- 2002: Talk to Her (Hable con ella) (song "Cucurrucucú paloma", live)
- 2002: Frida
- 2004: Meu Tio Matou um Cara
- 2004: Eros
- 2006: Nacho Libre
- 2007: Ó Paí, Ó
- 2008: Romance
- 2016: Moonlight ("Cucurrucucú paloma")

=== Compilations ===
- 1996: Red Hot + Rio, AIDS-Benefit Album produced by the Red Hot Organization, contributor on track "É Preciso Perdoar"
- 1998: Onda Sonora: Red Hot + Lisbon, AIDS-Benefit Album produced by the Red Hot Organization, contributor on track "Dreamworld: Marco de Canaveses"
- 2002: Todo Caetano (box set)

== Bibliography ==
- Perrone, Charles A. (1989), Masters of Contemporary Brazilian Song: MPB 1965–1985. Austin: University of Texas Press. Chapter 2 "Other Words and Other Worlds of Caetano Veloso".
- Wald, Elijah (2007). Global Minstrels: Voices of World Music. New York: Routledge. ISBN 978-0-415-97930-6.
- Veloso, Caetano (2003). Tropical Truth: A Story of Music and Revolution in Brazil. New York: Alfred A. Knopf.
- Mei, Giancarlo (2004). Canto Latino: Origine, Evoluzione e Protagonisti della Musica Popolare del Brasile (in Italian). Stampa Alternativa-Nuovi Equilibri.
- Veloso, Caetano (1997). Alegria, Alegria [Joy, Joy]. Rio de Janeiro, Brazil: Pedra que Ronca.
- Veloso, Caetano (1997). Verdade tropical [Tropical truth]. São Paulo, Brazil: Companhia das Letras.
- Veloso, Caetano (2003). Letra só [Letter only]. São Paulo, Brazil: Companhia das Letras.
- Veloso, Caetano (2005). O mundo não é chato [The world isn't boring]. São Paulo, Brazil: Companhia das Letras.
- Morais Junior Lui Morais, Luís Carlos de (2004). Crisólogo: O estudante de poesia Caetano Veloso [Crisólogo: The poetry student Caetano Veloso]. Rio de Janeiro, Brazil: HP Comunicação.
- De Stefano, Gildo, Il popolo del samba, La vicenda e i protagonisti della storia della musica popolare brasiliana, Preface by Chico Buarque de Hollanda, Introduction by Gianni Minà, RAI-ERI, Rome, 2005, ISBN 8839713484
- De Stefano, Gildo, Saudade Bossa Nova: musiche, contaminazioni e ritmi del Brasile, Preface by Chico Buarque, Introduction by Gianni Minà, Logisma Editore, Florence, 2017, ISBN 978-88-97530-88-6
