= List of Brazilian Grammy Award winners and nominees =

The following is a list of Grammy Awards winners and nominees from Brazil, including special awards.

Year	Category	Nominee(s)	Nominated for	Result	Ref.
1960	Best Classical Performance - Concerto Or Instrumental Soloist (Other Than Full Orchestral Accompaniment)	Laurindo Almeida	Danzas	Nominated	
1961	Best Classical Performance - Vocal Or Instrumental - Chamber Music	Laurindo Almeida	Conversations With The Guitar	Won	
1961	Best Classical Performance - Instrumental Soloist Or Duo (Other Than With Orchestral Accompaniment)	Laurindo Almeida	The Spanish Guitars Of Laurindo Almeida	Won	
1961	Best Engineering Contribution - Classical Recording	Laurindo Almeida	The Spanish Guitars Of Laurindo Almeida	Won	
1962	Best Classical Performance - Instrumental Soloist Or Duo (Without Orchestra)	Laurindo Almeida	Reverie For Spanish Guitar	Won	
1962	Best Contemporary Classical Composition	Laurindo Almeida	"Discantus"	Won	
1962	Album Of The Year - Classical	Laurindo Almeida	Reverie For Spanish Guitar	Nominated	
1963	Best Classical Performance - Chamber Music	Laurindo Almeida	The Intimate Bach	Nominated	
1963	Best Performance By An Orchestra - For Dancing	Laurindo Almeida	Viva Bossa Nova!	Nominated	
1963	Best Jazz Performance - Soloist Or Small Group (Instrumental)	Laurindo Almeida	Viva Bossa Nova!	Nominated	
1963	Best Background Arrangement	Antônio Carlos Jobim	João Gilberto	Nominated	
1964	Best Original Jazz Composition	Newton Mendonça; Antônio Carlos Jobim	Meditação	Nominated	
1964	Best Classical Composition By A Contemporary Composer	Heitor Villa-Lobos	"Cello Concerto No. 2"	Nominated	
1965	Album of the Year	João Gilberto	Getz/Gilberto (Note: The album won in the category "Best Instrumental Jazz Performance - Small Group or Soloist", but is not credited in João Gilberto's profile. It also won "Best Engineered Album, Non-Classical", but the award goes to the audio engineer(s), not to the artist or performer, except if the artist is also a credited engineer. The album was nominated in "Best Album Cover – Other Than Classical", but the category is presented to the art director of the album, not to the performer(s), unless the performer is also the art director.)	Won	
1965	Best Vocal Performance, Male	João Gilberto	Getz/Gilberto	Nominated	
1965	Best Album Notes	João Gilberto	Getz/Gilberto	Nominated	
1965	Best Vocal Performance, Female	Astrud Gilberto	"The Girl from Ipanema"	Nominated	
1965	Record of the Year	Astrud Gilberto	"The Girl from Ipanema"	Won	
1965	Best New Artist	Astrud Gilberto	Herself	Nominated	
1965	Best New Artist	Antônio Carlos Jobim	Himself	Nominated	
1965	Best Instrumental Jazz Performance - Large Group Or Soloist With Large Group	Laurindo Almeida	Guitar From Ipanema	Won	
1965	Best Instrumental Jazz Performance - Small Group Or Soloist With Small Group	Laurindo Almeida	Collaboration	Nominated	
1966	Best Vocal Performance, Female	Astrud Gilberto	The Astrud Gilberto Album	Nominated	
1968	Album of the Year	Antônio Carlos Jobim	Francis Albert Sinatra & Antonio Carlos Jobim (Note: The album was also nominated in the category "Best Vocal Performance, Male", but is not credited in Antônio Carlos Jobim's profile.)	Nominated	
1968	Best Instrumental Theme	Chico Buarque	"A Banda"	Nominated	
1969	Best Contemporary-Pop Performance, Vocal Duo Or Group	Sérgio Mendes and Brazil '66	"Fool On The Hill"	Nominated	
1973	Best Classical Performance - Instrumental Soloist Or Soloists (Without Orchestra)	Laurindo Almeida	The Art Of Laurindo Almeida	Nominated	
1974	Best New Artist	Eumir Deodato	Himself	Nominated	
1974	Best Pop Instrumental Performance	Eumir Deodato	"Also Sprach Zarathustra (2001)"	Won	
1976	Best New Artist	Morris Albert	Himself	Nominated	
1976	Song of the Year	Morris Albert	"Feelings"	Nominated	
1976	Best Pop Vocal Performance, Male	Morris Albert	"Feelings"	Nominated	
1978	Best Jazz Vocal Performance	João Gilberto	Amoroso	Nominated	
1979	Best Latin Recording	Laurindo Almeida Trio	Laurindo Almeida Trio	Nominated	
1980	Best Latin Recording	Airto Moreira	Touching You, Touching Me	Nominated	
1981	Best R&B Instrumental Performance	Eumir Deodato	"Night Cruiser"	Nominated	
1982	Best Latin Recording	Laurindo Almeida	Brazilian Soul	Nominated	
1985	Best Mexican-American Performance	Roberto Carlos	"Cóncavo y Convexo"	Nominated	
1986	Best Jazz Vocal Performance, Female	Flora Purim	"20 Years Blue"	Nominated	
1987	Best Jazz Vocal Performance, Female	Flora Purim	"Esquinas"	Nominated	
1989	Best Latin Pop Performance	Roberto Carlos	Roberto Carlos	Won	
1989	Best Jazz Vocal Performance, Male	João Gilberto	Live in Montreux	Nominated	
1990	Best Jazz Fusion Performance, Vocal or Instrumental	Armando Marçal (Note: As percussionist in Pat Metheny's group.)	Letter from Home	Won	
1992	Best World Music Album	Dori Caymmi	Brazilian Serenata	Nominated	
1992	Best World Music Album	Milton Nascimento	Txai	Nominated	
1993	Best Engineered Album, Non-Classical	Moogie Canazio	Brasileiro	Nominated	
1993	Best World Music Album	Sérgio Mendes	Brasileiro	Won	
1994	Best Contemporary Jazz Performance (Instrumental)	Armando Marçal (Note: As percussionist in Pat Metheny's group.)	The Road to You	Won	
1995	Best World Music Album	Milton Nascimento	Angelus	Nominated	
1996	Best Improvised Jazz Solo	Eliane Elias	"The Way You Look Tonight"	Nominated	
1996	Best Latin Jazz Album	Antônio Carlos Jobim; Paulo Jobim; Daniel Jobim	Antônio Brasileiro	Won	
1997	Best Engineered Album, Non-Classical	Moogie Canazio	Oceano by Sérgio Mendes	Nominated	
1997	Best Latin Jazz Performance	Ivan Lins	The Heart Speaks	Nominated	
1998	Best Latin Jazz Performance	Banda Mantiqueira	Aldeia	Nominated	
1998	Best World Music Album	Milton Nascimento	Nascimento	Won	
1999	Best World Music Album	Gilberto Gil	Quanta Live	Won	
1999	Best Classical Crossover Album	Gaudêncio Thiago de Mello	Journey To The Amazon (Works Of Almeida, Barrios, Brouwer, Etc.)	Nominated	
2000	Best World Music Album	Caetano Veloso	Livro	Won	
2000	Best Instrumental Arrangement	Dori Caymmi	Pink Panther	Nominated	
2001	Best World Music Album	João Gilberto; Moogie Canazio; Caetano Veloso	João Voz e Violão	Won	
2002	Best World Music Album	Gilberto Gil; Milton Nascimento	Gil & Milton	Nominated	
2002	Best Traditional Tropical Latin Album	Caetano Veloso	Canto by Los Super Seven	Nominated	
2002	Best Large Jazz Ensemble Album	Eliane Elias	Impulsive!	Nominated	
2002	Best Latin Jazz Album	Eliane Elias	Calle 54 by Various Artists	Nominated	
2003	Best Latin Jazz Album	Duduka da Fonseca	Samba Jazz Fantasia	Nominated	
2003	Best Jazz Vocal Album	Luciana Souza	Brazilian Duos	Nominated	
2004	Best Jazz Vocal Album	Luciana Souza	North and South	Nominated	
2004	Best Traditional World Music Album	Grupo de Capoeira Angola Pelourinho	Capoeira Angola 2 - Brincando Na Roda	Nominated	
2004	Best Contemporary World Music Album	Caetano Veloso	Live in Bahia	Nominated	
2005	Best Contemporary World Music Album	Bebel Gilberto	Bebel Gilberto	Nominated	
2006	Best Contemporary World Music Album	Gilberto Gil; Liminha	Eletracústico	Won	
2006	Best Jazz Vocal Album	Luciana Souza	Duos II	Nominated	
2006	Best Instrumental Arrangement Accompanying Vocalist(s)	Heitor Pereira	What Are You Doing The Rest Of Your Life?	Won	
2007	Best Urban/Alternative Performance	Sérgio Mendes	"That Heat"	Nominated	
2007	Best Urban/Alternative Performance	Sérgio Mendes	"Mas Que Nada"	Nominated	
2007	Best Chamber Music Performance	Antônio Meneses	Shostakovich: Piano Trios 1 & 2, Seven Romances On Verses By Alexander Blok	Nominated	
2008	Album of the Year	Luciana Souza	River: The Joni Letters (as featured artist)	Won	
2008	Best Contemporary World Music Album	Céu	CéU	Nominated	
2008	Best Contemporary World Music Album	Bebel Gilberto	Momento	Nominated	
2008	Best Contemporary World Music Album	Gilberto Gil	Gil Luminoso	Nominated	
2009	Best Contemporary World Music Album	Gilberto Gil	Banda Larga Cordel	Nominated	
2009	Best Contemporary Jazz Album	Eduardo Santos; Ruriá Duprat	Randy in Brasil	Nominated	
2010	Best Latin Jazz Album	Claudio Roditi	Brazilliance X 4	Nominated	
2010	Best Jazz Vocal Album	Luciana Souza	Tide	Nominated	
2011	Best Contemporary World Music Album	Bebel Gilberto	All in One	Nominated	
2011	Best Contemporary World Music Album	Sérgio Mendes	Bom Tempo	Nominated	
2012	Lifetime Achievement Award	Antônio Carlos Jobim		Won	
2013	Best Engineered Album, Non-Classical	Moogie Canazio	The Absence	Nominated	
2013	Best Classical Instrumental Solo	Antônio Meneses; Cláudio Cruz	Gal & Elgar: Cello Concertos	Nominated	
2013	Best Jazz Vocal Album	Luciana Souza	The Book of Chet	Nominated	
2013	Best Latin Jazz Album	Luciana Souza	Duos III	Nominated	
2014	Best Latin Jazz Album	Trio Corrente	Song for Maura	Won	
2015	Best World Music Album	Sérgio Mendes	Magic	Nominated	
2016	Best World Music Album	Gilberto Gil	Gilbertos Samba Ao Vivo	Nominated	
2016	Best Latin Jazz Album	Eliane Elias; Rodrigo de Castro Lopes	Made in Brazil	Won	
2017	Best World Music Album	Caetano Veloso; Gilberto Gil	Dois Amigos, Um Século de Música: Multishow Live	Nominated	
2017	Best Latin Jazz Album	Trio da Paz	30	Nominated	
2018	Best Latin Jazz Album	Marcello Gonçalves	Outra Coisa – The Music of Moacir Santos	Nominated	
2018	Best World Music Album	Trio Brasileiro	Rosa Dos Ventos	Nominated	
2019	Best Latin Pop Album	Moogie Canazio	Sincera by Claudia Brant	Won	
2020	Best Arrangement, Instrumental and Vocals	Diego Figueiredo	"Marry Me A Little"	Nominated	
2020	Best Latin Jazz Album	Thalma de Freitas; Chico Pinheiro; Duduka da Fonseca	Sorte!: Music By John Finbury	Nominated	
2021	Best Latin Jazz Album	Chico Pinheiro	City of Dreams	Nominated	
2021	Best Global Music Album	Bebel Gilberto	Agora	Nominated	
2022	Best Latin Jazz Album	Eliane Elias	Mirror Mirror	Won	
2023	Best Latin Jazz Album	Flora Purim	If You Will	Nominated	
2023	Best New Artist	Anitta		Nominated	
2023	Album of the Year	Matheus Braz	Renaissance (as engineer)	Nominated	
2025	Best Latin Pop Album	Anitta	Funk Generation	Nominated	
2025	Album of the Year	Matheus Braz	Cowboy Carter (as engineer)	Won	
2026	Best Global Music Album	Caetano Veloso; Maria Bethânia	Caetano e Bethânia Ao Vivo	Won	
2026	Best Choral Performance	Luciana Souza	Childs: In The Arms Of The Beloved	Nominated	
