= Zé Luis Oliveira =

- Also known as: Zé Luis Segneri, Zé Luiz
- Born: José Luis Segneri Oliveira; Rio de Janeiro, Brazil
- Genres: Bossa Nova; Brazilian Pop; Brazilian Traditional; Samba; World; Jazz
- Occupations: Composer, arranger, producer, multi-instrumentalist
- Instruments: Saxophone, flute
- Years active: 1977–present
- Label: Malandro Records / ZL NY
- Website: zeluis.com

José Luis Segneri Oliveira (aka Zé Luis) (born December 17, 1957) is a Brazilian composer, saxophonist, flutist, producer, arranger and multi-instrumentalist. Oliveira became famous in the 1980s performing and recording with Caetano Veloso, Gilberto Gil, Gal Costa, Tania Maria and Cazuza.

== Early life ==
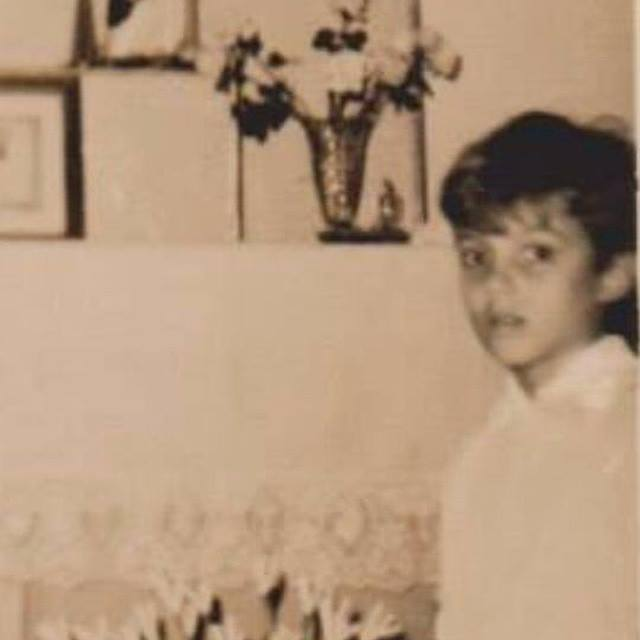
Oliveira grew up in Ipanema - Rio de Janeiro, Brazil.

Oliveira was born in Rio de Janeiro and as a child lived next to Antonio Carlos Jobim in the historic neighborhood of Ipanema.

“These precious sounds of a legend arrested his soul, hooked him on music and never let him go.” - DownBeat magazine

Early on Oliveira began playing flute and in 1975 he graduated from Pro-Art Conservatoire in flute and traditional harmony. In 1977 he continued his studies in Performance Arts at Villa-Lobos Institute and soon after studied with renown Brazilian saxophonist and clarinet player Paulo Moura.

== Career ==
=== 1970s in Brazil ===
In the mid-70s he became heavily influenced by the album Native Dancer — the collaboration between American saxophonist Wayne Shorter and Brazilian musician Milton Nascimento. He was also drawn to the music and virtuosity of Ian Anderson, leader and flutist of the British band Jethro Tull.

Zé's first professional engagements began with Brazilian vocalists Ney Matogrosso and Luiz Melodia.

=== 1980s in Brazil ===
Oliveira met pianist Tomás Improta while working with Brazilian actress and singer Zezé Motta, who was working at that time with emerging international talent Caetano Veloso — a composer, singer, guitarist, writer, and political activist.

Improta invited Oliveira to record on Caetano's album Outras Palavras and soon after Veloso showed up to a performance where Oliveira was backing singer Marina Lima. After the show, Caetano invited Oliveira to join his newly formed band. This ignited a professional relationship with Caetano from 1981 to 1987 as a member both A Outra Banda da Terra and Banda Nova. His association with Caetano Veloso led to performances at the most respected theaters, clubs and festivals around the world.

During this time Oliveira also worked extensively with Brazilian singer, guitarist, and songwriter Gilberto Gil which included a performance with Gil at the first Rock in Rio in 1985 and working with The Wailers on the seminal album Raça Humana.

In 1986 Oliveira was invited to be part of the popular show Chico & Caetano on Globo TV where he played with world class Brazilian musicians Chico Buarque, Rita Lee, Milton Nascimento, João Bosco, Elza Soares, and Mercedes Sosa.

The 1980s also cultivated a professional association and friendship with the late Brazilian singer Cazuza. In 1985 he was invited as a special guest to perform with his rock band Barão Vermelho to perform at Rock in Rio.

=== 1990s in New York ===
Upon moving to New York in 1990, Oliveira began studying with esteemed American jazz saxophonists Joe Lovano (1991–1992) and Ted Nash (1992–1994) at NYU. In 2004, Oliveira received his master's degree in Composition and Arranging from the Juilliard School.

Oliveira worked for a strong foothold on the New York music scene while working as the musical director for Brazilian American pop singer and daughter of João Gilberto, Bebel Gilberto. Zé's studio work with Bebel along with steady gigs at the Windows on the World lead to an extensive performing, recording and touring. His career also includes multiple Grammy Award nominations.

Throughout the 1990s, Oliveira continued to record and perform with hundreds of artists including Sabina Sciubba, Brazilian Girls, Ivy, Pull, and Verve. From 1992 to 1995 he was a member of Milo Z on Mercury, a PolyGram label, opening for Neville Brothers, Reverend Al Green, Maceo Parker, Chuck Brown and The Should Searchers (with the P Funk Horns), George Porter Jr. and The Funky Meters.

In 1993, Oliveira composed and performed for the Choreographer and Dancer Patricia Hoffbauer at Dance Theater Workshop, as part of a Meet the Composer grant. Oliveira then became a part of the New York Samba Band with Duduka da Fonseca, Romero Lubambo, Cyro Baptista and Nilson Matta.

=== 2000s ===
Oliveira has played and recorded with Kurt Elling, Romero Lubambo, Duduka da Fonseca, Yusef Lateef, Paulo Braga, Mark Soskin, David Finck, Dom Um Romão, Dom Salvador, Mario Adnet, Maucha Adnet, Adam Rudolph, Kenny Burrell, Rolando Luna, Jorge Chicoy, Ike Stubblefield, George Porter Jr., Keith Carlock, Joel Rosemblatt, Kenny Wessel and Ralph Jones.

In 2007, Oliveira teamed up with producer Mitch Davis and the band Orba Squara launching the track "Perfect Timing (This Morning)" heard in the commercial for the first iPhone His continued collaborating with Davis producing music for the original music house Tomandandy. He partnered with Brazilian Film and Record Producer Béco Dranoff to form an original composition and production team called Sambismo.

=== Recent work ===
Since 2013, Oliveira has been producing, engineering and playing for the international music web series Trade Winds tracing the roots of African music in the Americas by building artist collectives along the former Atlantic trade routes in coastal cities.

The 2015 album Trade Winds Cuba was a "street-level view of one of the world's most interesting music scenes" featuring over 100 Cuban musicians. It was considered for Best Latin Jazz Album by the 59th Grammy Award nominating committee with additional consideration for Best Jazz Improvised Solo.

In 2015, his Atelier Music Studio, operational for 19 years, was selected for the Best of Brooklyn Award in the Music Production category.

That same year he was invited to perform for "The Music Of David Byrne & Talking Heads" at Carnegie Hall with Bebel Gilberto.

Currently Oliveira is the Producer of Just Play, a traveling improvisational music series and global storytelling project.

== Film and TV ==
As a composer Oliveira has written and produced music featured in:

- Subway to the Stars (Cannes Film Festival)
- Beyond the Streets (Cannes Film Festival)
- The Last 15(Cannes Film Festival)
- En Route to Baghdad (Tribeca Film Festival)
- Independent Lens
- Rio (directed by Carlos Saldanha)
- Ghosts of Girlfriends Past (directed by Mark Waters)
- Monster-in-Law (directed by Robert Luketic)
- A Raisin in the Sun (directed by Kenny Leon)
- Burn Notice (TV series creator: Matt Nix, directed by Jace Alexander).
- Piercing (directed by Nicolas Pesce, with music arranged by Eumir Deodato.

== Notable performances ==
=== With Caetano Veloso ===
- Montreux Jazz Festival (1983)
- Olympia de Paris (1983)
- Soccer Stadium in Tel Aviv (1983)
- Haifa's Shrine of the Báb (1983)
- Public Theater in New York (1983)
- Coliseu dos Recreios in Lisbon (1985)
- Anniversary of Barcelona on the Cathedral Square (1985)
- Carnegie Hall (Sept 24 & 25, 1985)
- Teatro Castro Alves (Salvador Bahia)
- Mineirinho Stadium in Belo Horizonte with guest Milton Nascimento.

== Instruments ==
- Tenor Sax Selmer Mark VI (85.000 series)
- Soprano Sax Selmer Mark VI (200.000 series)
- Flute Custom Made Haynes 1955 (Solid Silver)
- Alto Flute Armstrong 1960's Silver Head
- Endorsement by D'Addario & Company, Inc.

== Grammy nominations ==
- 2004: Best Contemporary World Music Album - "Bebel Gilberto - Bebel Gilberto" (Instrumentalist)
- 2007: Best Contemporary World Music Album - "Bebel Gilberto - Momento" (Instrumentalist)
- 2010: Best Contemporary World Music Album - "Bebel Gilberto - All In One" (Instrumentalist and Arranger)
- 2016: Best Latin Pop Album - "Diego Torres - Buena Vida" (Instrumentalist and Arranger)

== Selected discography ==
=== As leader ===
- Zé Luis (EP)
- Guarani Banana (1999)
- Caiapo (2006)
- Green Heart (2007 Compilation)

=== As sideman ===
==== Caetano Veloso ====
- Outros Palavras (1981) (Golden Record: 100,000 Sold)
- Cores, Nomes (1982) (Golden Record: 100,000 Sold)
- Uns (1983)
- Brazil Night in Montreux '83 (1983)
- Velo (1984)
- Tenda dos Milagres (1985 TV Mini Series Soundtrack)
- Sem Lenço, Sem Documento (1990 Compilation)
- Caetano (José) (1988)
- Caetanear(1997)

==== Gilberto Gil ====
- Mestres da MPB – Gilberto Gil Vol. 2 (1982 Compilation)
- Raça Humana (1984)
- Dia Dorim Noite Neon (1985)
- Soy Loco Por Ti America (1987)
- Um Trem Para As Estrelas (Trilha Sonora) (1987)
- Rio Zone (1988 – Original Soundtrack/France)
- Sucessos + Raridades (2000)
- Nova Série (2008)

==== Barão Vermelho e Cazuza ====
- Maior Abandonado(1984)
- Barão Vermelho (1985)
- Rock in Rio Barão Vermelho 1985 – (1985)
- Personalidade (1991 Compilation)
- Ideologia (1997), Instrumentalist and Composer Obrigado (Por Ter Se Mandado)
- Exagerado (1998), Instrumentalist and composer on Cúmplice
- Só Se For a Dois (2000), Instrumentalist and composer Quarta Feira
- O Poeta Esta Vivo (2005), Composer Quarta Feira
- Esse Cara (2005 Compilation)
- Melhores Momentos de Barão Vermelho e Cazuza (1989 Compilation)

==== Bebel Gilberto ====
- Tanto Tempo(2000) (2.5 Million Copy Sold)
- Bebel Gilberto (2004)
- Momento (2007)
- All in One (2009), Flute and Arranger
- Rio: Music From the Motion Picture (2011 Soundtrack)

==== Chico & Caetano ====
- Melhores Momentos de Chico e Caetano – Ao Vivo (1997)

==== Tania Maria ====
- Outrageous (1993)
- Outrageously Wild (2003)

==== Gal Costa ====
- Bem Bom (1985)(Platinum Record: 1.25 Million Sold)

Simone

- Café Com Leite (1998)

Diego Torres

- Buena Vida (2015)

Mario Adnet

- Para Gershwin e Jobim (2005)

Robert Lamm

- The Bossa Project(2008)

=== Collaborations ===
With Matt Geraghty Project

- Trade Winds Cuba(2015), Producer, Engineer, Mixing, Featured Artist, Flute, Saxophone, Mixing Engineer

With Sambismo

With Arthur Lipner

- Portrait in World Jazz (1998)
- Modern Vibe (2004)
- Two Hands, One Heart (2015)

With Go: Organic Orchestra/Adam Rudolph

- Sonic Mandala (2012)
- Sound of a Dream (2010)

==== Other ====
- Magazine (2001)
- Tambores Urbanos – Sérgio Boré (1995)
- This Is Where I Belong: The Songs of Ray Davies (2002)
