= Grammy Award for Best Contemporary World Music Album =

Music award category

- Awarded for: quality contemporary world music albums
- Country: United States
- Presented by: National Academy of Recording Arts and Sciences
- First award: 2004
- Final award: 2011
- Website: grammy.com

The Grammy Award for Best Contemporary World Music Album was an honor presented to recording artists between 2004 and 2011 for quality contemporary world music albums. The Grammy Awards, an annual ceremony that was established in 1958 and originally called the Gramophone Awards, are presented by the National Academy of Recording Arts and Sciences of the United States to "honor artistic achievement, technical proficiency and overall excellence in the recording industry, without regard to album sales or chart position".

The Grammy Award for Best World Music Album was first presented at the 34th Grammy Awards in 1992. The category remained unchanged until 2004, when it was split into separate awards for Grammy Award for Best Traditional World Music Album and Best Contemporary World Music Album. The first award for Best Contemporary World Music Album was presented to Cesária Évora at the 46th Grammy Awards for the album Voz d'Amor. In 2011, a major overhaul of the Grammy categories resulted in the merge of the two awards to a single Best World Music Album category beginning in 2012.

== Recipients ==
Year^{[I]}	Performing artist(s)	Nationality	Work	Nominees	Ref.
2004	Cesária Évora	Cape Verde	Voz d'Amor	Bill Frisell - The Intercontinentals; Youssou N'Dour - Nothing's in Vain (Coono du Reer); Orchestra Baobab - Specialist in All Styles; Caetano Veloso - Live in Bahia	
2005	Fathy Salama	Egypt	Egypt	Paco de Lucía - Cositas Buenas; Bebel Gilberto - Bebel Gilberto; Gipsy Kings - Roots; Angélique Kidjo - Oyaya!	
2006	Gilberto Gil	Brazil	Eletracústico	Amadou & Mariam - Dimanche à Bamako; Kronos Quartet and Asha Bhosle - You've Stolen My Heart: Songs from R.D. Burman's Bollywood; Ladysmith Black Mambazo and the Strings of the English Chamber Orchestra - No Boundaries; Anoushka Shankar - Rise	
2007	The Klezmatics	USA	Wonder Wheel	Richard Bona - Tiki; Salif Keita - M'Bemba; Ladysmith Black Mambazo - Long Walk to Freedom; Ali Farka Touré- Savane	
2008	Angélique Kidjo	Benin	Djin Djin	Céu - CéU; Gilberto Gil - Gil Luminoso; Bebel Gilberto - Momento; Loreena McKennitt - An Ancient Muse	
2009	Mickey Hart, Zakir Hussain, Sikiru Adepoju and Giovanni Hidalgo	USA	Global Drum Project	Lila Downs - Shake Away; Gilberto Gil - Banda Larga Cordel; Youssou N'Dour - Rokku Mi Rokka (Give And Take); Soweto Gospel Choir - Live At The Nelson Mandela Theater	
2010	Bela Fleck	USA	Tales from the Acoustic Planet, Vol. 3: Africa Sessions	Amadou & Mariam - Welcome To Mali; Femi Kuti - Day by Day; Oumou Sangare - Seya; Omar Sosa - Across the Divide: A Tale of Rhythm & Ancestry	
2011	Bela Fleck	USA	Throw Down Your Heart: Africa Sessions Part 2: Unreleased Tracks	Bebel Gilberto - All in One; Angelique Kidjo - Õÿö; Sérgio Mendes - Bom Tempo; Chandrika Krishnamurthy Tandon- Om Namo Narayanaya: Soul Call	
