= Ego Trip =

Ego Trip or Egotrip may refer to:

== Music ==
- Ego Trip (Kurtis Blow album), 1984
- Ego Trip (Papa Roach album), 2022
- Ego Trip (Sikter album), 2009
- Egotrip, a Brazilian 1980s pop/rock band
- "Ego Trip", a song by Mushroomhead from the album Mushroomhead
- "Ego Trip", a song by American psychedelic rock band Ultimate Spinach
- "Egotrip", a song by Brazilian new wave band Blitz

== Other uses ==
- Ego trip (magazine), a 1990s hip hop magazine
- Dexter's Laboratory: Ego Trip, a 1999 animated television movie based on the animated series Dexter's Laboratory

== See also ==
- Ego Tripping (disambiguation)
