= Extras =

Extras or The Extras may refer to:

- Extra (acting) or background actor, a performer who appears in a silent capacity
- Extras (TV series), a British sitcom
- Extras (2001 film), a Chinese documentary film
- Extras (2024 film), a Canadian short comedy film directed by Marc-Antoine Lemire
- Extras (novel), by Scott Westerfeld
- Extras (album), a compilation album by the Jam
- Extras (The Mango People), a 2011 Pakistani sitcom drama serial
- "The Extras" (The Amazing World of Gumball), a television episode
- Extra (cricket), a run scored not attributed to a particular batsman
- Al-Kompars, a 1993 Syrian film titled The Extras in international markets

== See also ==
- Extra innings
- Extra
