= Tropicália 2 =

Studio album by Caetano Veloso and Gilberto Gil
- Released: August 1993
- Recorded: March 1993–May 1993
- Studio: Nas Nuvens (Rio de Janeiro); Polygram (Rio de Janeiro); WR Salvador (Salvador)
- Genre: MPB; Tropicália
- Length: 42:06
- Label: WEA; Elektra; Nonesuch; Philips; PolyGram; Universal
- Producer: Caetano Veloso; Gilberto Gil; Liminha

Caetano Veloso chronology
Circuladô ao Vivo (1992)	Tropicália 2 (1993)	Fina Estampa (1994)

Gilberto Gil chronology
Parabolicamará (1991)	Tropicália 2 (1993)	Acústico MTV (1994)

Tropicália 2 is an album by Brazilian musicians Caetano Veloso and Gilberto Gil, released in August 1993 through WEA. It celebrates the 25th anniversary of the release of Tropicália: ou Panis et Circencis.

== Background and recording ==
Tropicália 2 was recorded from March 1993 to May 1993 at Nas Nuvens and Polygram in Rio de Janeiro and WR Salvador in Salvador, Bahia.

== Music and lyrics ==
The album features politically charged lyrics on topics such as superpower imperialism, Third World poverty, and the AIDS epidemic. "Haiti" links the Carandiru massacre to the history of slavery on a transnational scale, and also references Paul Simon's 1990 album The Rhythm of the Saints, which features several Brazilian musicians.

== Critical reception ==
Professional ratings
Review scores
Source	Rating
AllMusic	4/5 stars

Alvaro Neder of AllMusic said, "The album, in philosophical terms, expresses fragile concepts. Poetically and musically, represents good entertainment, and, in its best moments, good Art."

== Track listing ==
No.	Title	Writer(s)	Length
1.	"Haiti"	Caetano Veloso (music & lyrics); Gilberto Gil (music)	4:19
2.	"Cinema novo"	Gil (music); Veloso (lyrics)	4:14
3.	"Nossa gente"	Roque Carvalho	2:53
4.	"Rap popcreto"	Veloso	1:58
5.	"Wait Until Tomorrow"	Jimi Hendrix	3:25
6.	"Tradição"	Gil	5:54
7.	"As coisas"	Gil (music); Arnaldo Antunes (lyrics)	2:39
8.	"Aboio"	Veloso	1:32
9.	"Dada"	Veloso (music); Gil (lyrics)	3:00
10.	"Cada Macaco no seu galho (cho chuá)"	Riachão	3:21
11.	"Baião atemporal"	Gil	3:40
12.	"Desde que o samba é samba"	Veloso	5:11
Total length:			42:06

Notes

- "Wait Until Tomorrow" is a cover of the song of the same name by the Jimi Hendrix Experience.

== Personnel ==
Credits adapted from liner notes.

- Caetano Veloso – vocals (all tracks except 4), acoustic guitar (5, 8, 9, 12), rhythm arrangement (2, 8, 12), keyboards with samplers (4), whistling (1), horn arrangement (6)
- Gilberto Gil – vocals (all tracks except 4), acoustic guitar (1, 2, 5–7, 9, 11, 12), electric guitar (10), rhythm arrangement (2, 7, 11, 12), horn arrangement (6)
- Liminha - acoustic guitar (9), horn arrangement (6), rhythm & cello arrangements (7), bass (1, 7, 10, 11), drum programming (1, 7, 10), guitar [Ebow] (1), keyboards (1), percussion (1), sampler (4)
- Nara Gil – vocals (5)
- Celso Fonseca – acoustic guitar (11)
- Raphael Rabello – seven-string acoustic guitar & rhythm arrangement (2)
- Beterlau – agogô (2)
- Zé Carlos – alto saxophone (3, 6)
- Serginho Trombone – trombone & horn arrangement (3, 6)
- Léo Gandelman – baritone saxophone (3, 6)
- Arthur Maia – bass (3)
- Dadi – bass (9)
- Dininho – bass (2)
- Nico Assumpção – six-string bass (6, 12)
- Luciana Rabello – cavaquinho (2)
- Alceu De Almeida Reis – cello (2)
- Lui Coimbra – cello & cello arrangement (9)
- Luiz Fernando Zamith – cello (2)
- Marcio Mallard – cello (2)
- Moreno Veloso – cello (1, 7), pandeiro (8)
- Zeca Da Cuica – cuica (2)
- Ramiro Musotto – drum programming (1, 10)
- Carlinhos Bala – drums (3)
- Wilson das Neves – drums (2)
- Lucas Santtana – flute (11)
- Wilson Canegal – ganzá (2)
- Pedro Sá – guitar (7)
- Daniel Jobim – keyboards (8)
- William Magalhães – keyboards (11)
- Zizinho – pandeiro (2)
- Carlinhos Brown – percussion (5, 6, 10), shaker (1)
- Firmino – percussion (11)
- Marcelo Costa – percussion (9)
- Cosminho – bacurinha (5, 10)
- Trambique – repinique (2)
- Bogam – surdo (5, 10)
- Roberto Bastos Pinheiro – surdo (2)
- Marçal – tamborim (2)
- Raul Mascarenhas – tenor saxophone (3, 6)
- Léo Bit Bit – surdo virado (5), timbales (10)
- Bidinho – trumpet (3), flugelhorn (6)
- Márcio Montarroyos – trumpet (3), flugelhorn (6)
- Arlindo Penteado – viola (2)
- Hindemburgo Pereira – viola (2)
- Aizik Geller – violin (2)
- César Guerra-Peixe – string arrangement (2)
- Rodrigo Campello – cello arrangement (9)
- Chris Bellman – mastering
