= Extra =

Extra, Xtra, or The Extra may refer to:

== Persons ==
- Walter Extra (born 1954), German pilot and aircraft designer

== Arts, entertainment and media ==
=== Film ===
- Extra (acting), actor in a minor role
- The Extra (1962 film), Mexican film
- The Extra (2005 film), Australian film

=== Literature ===
- Extra (newspaper), Brazilian newspaper
- Extra!, American media criticism magazine
- Diario Extra (Costa Rica), newspaper
- Extra Magazine, Italian weekly magazine
- Newspaper extra, supplemental issue
- Xtra (newspaper), published by the Norwegian Young Conservatives, 1922–2010
- Xtra Magazine, Canadian website, former newspaper

=== Music ===
- Extra (Gilberto Gil album), 1983, also the title track
- Extra, Vol. 1, album by KMFDM
- "Extra", song by Ken Ishii from his album Jelly Tones (1995)
- "Extra", song by Future from Save Me (EP) (2019)
- "Extra", song by Tages from their album Extra Extra (1966)
- Xtra (EP), by Oh Land (2022)

=== Television and radio stations ===
- E4 Extra, a British television channel
- Extra (Australian TV channel)
- Extra TV, a defunct Argentine television news channel
- Extra TV 42, a defunct Costa Rican television channel
- Mediaset Extra, an Italian television channel
- NPO 1 Extra, a Dutch television channel
- NPO 2 Extra, a Dutch television channel
- NPO 3 Extra, a defunct Dutch television channel
- SVT Extra, a defunct Swedish television channel
- YLE Extra, a defunct Finnish television channel
- EinsExtra, the former name of German television news channel tagesschau24
- XTRA, call sign formerly used by Tijuana, Mexico radio station XEWW-AM
- BBC Radio 1Xtra, Black British radio station from the BBC
- Capital Xtra, Black British radio station from Global Media & Entertainment

=== Television shows ===
- Extra (Australian TV program), 1991–2009
- Extra (American TV program), since 1994
- extra (franchise), or extr@, language-education television program (2002–2004)
- Extra, TV game by Norsk Tipping

== Businesses and organisations ==
- Extra (gum), by Wrigley
- Extra (service areas), UK motorway service-station chain
- Extra (supermarket), now defunct German food-retail chain
- Extra (Coop), Norwegian supermarket chain
- EXTRA, former mobile phone brand of SmarTone
- Extra (retail chain), hypermarket and supermarket chain in Brazil
- Pibb Xtra, soft drink created and marketed by Coca-Cola
- Tiendas Extra, Mexican convenience store chain

== Computing ==
- Xtra (ISP), Internet service provider owned by Spark New Zealand (then called Telecom)
- Xtra (Macromedia), software plug-in
- Yahoo!Xtra, a.k.a. XtraMSN, web portal

== Sports ==
- Extra (cricket), a run not involving hitting the ball
- Extra (sailing), a sail not part of the sail plan

== Transportation ==
- Extra Aircraft, German light aircraft manufacturer
- Renault Extra, van
- Xtra (automobile), English three-wheel cyclecar
- Kolb Mark III Xtra, American ultralight aircraft

== Other uses ==
- Extra, West Virginia, U.S.
- EXTRA artillery rocket system, Israeli artillery rocket system

== See also ==
- Extras (disambiguation)
