= Extra Extra =

Extra Extra may refer to:

- Newspaper extra, a special issue of a newspaper, advertised with the shout "Extra! Extra! Read all about it!", which became a catchphrase

== Film and television ==
- Extra! Extra!, a 1922 American silent film
- Extra Challenge, formerly Extra, Extra 1999–2003, a Philippines TV news show
- Extra! Extra!, a 1988 Canadian TV drama featuring Jodie Resther
- Extra! Extra! Read All About It!, a 1993 Irish TV sitcom
- "Extra, Extra", a 1982 episode of Three's Company
- "Extra!...Extra!", a segment of Extra (American TV program)

== Music ==
- Extra Extra (album), by Tages, 1966
- Extra Extra (EP), by Be Your Own Pet, 2005
- "Extra! Extra!", a song by Irving Berlin, from the 1949 musical Miss Liberty

== Other uses ==
- Extra extra, a species of small sea snail
- Extra Extra, Read All About It!: My Life as a Film and TV Extra, a 2012 autobiography of Harry Fielder

== See also ==
- Extra (disambiguation)
- Extree! Extree!, a podcast created by Michael Swaim
