= Soy Loco por Ti America =

Studio album by Gilberto Gil
- Released: 1987
- Genre: Tropicália, pop
- Label: Braziloid/Celluloid

Gilberto Gil chronology
Gilberto Gil em Concerto (1987)	Soy Loco por Ti America (1987)	Trem Para As Estrelas (Trilha Sonora) (1987)

Soy Loco por Ti America is an album by the Brazilian musician Gilberto Gil. It was released internationally in 1988.

== Production ==
The title track was written in the 1960s by Gil and José Carlos Capinam; a cover version first appeared on Caetano Veloso's Caetano Veloso. Gil sang in Portuguese, Spanish, French, and English.

== Critical reception ==
Professional ratings
Review scores
Source	Rating
AllMusic	3/5 stars
Robert Christgau	A−
MusicHound World: The Essential Album Guide	3/5 stars
The Rolling Stone Album Guide	3.5/5 stars
Spin Alternative Record Guide	7/10

Robert Christgau deemed the album an "effortlessly funky tour de force," writing that "Milton Nascimento and Caetano Veloso are aesthetes like, to be kind, Joni Mitchell; Gil is a pop adept like Stevie Wonder." The New York Times wrote that Gil "embraces American grooves from the sambas and Bahian rhythms of his native Brazil to Jamaican reggae, Haitian compas, Puerto Rican salsa and James Brown funk—lending all of them the jauntiness of his band, the earthy directness of his voice and his distinctive melodic lift."

The Washington Post considered Soy Loco por Ti America to be "as sensuous and as rhythmically enticing an example of Gil's 'Tropicalism' as you're likely to find." The Boston Globe praised the "raw sound, pointed lyrics and very sophisticated stylistic blends."

AllMusic called the album "an electric album with plenty of brass attacks," writing that "it is fully danceable yet melodically rich and lyrically expressive."

== Track listing ==
No.	Title	Length
1.	"Aquele Abraço"
2.	"Vida"
3.	"Mamma"
4.	"Soy Loco por Ti America"
5.	"Babá Ala Palá"
6.	"Jubiabá"
7.	"Mar de Copacabana"
8.	"Mardi 10 Mars"
