= XETRA =

XETRA may refer to:

- XEWW-AM, formerly XETRA, a commercial AM radio station in Baja California, Mexico
- XETRA-FM, an English-language radio station in Baja California, Mexico
- Xetra (trading system), a trading venue operated by the Frankfurt Stock Exchange

== See also ==
- Extra (disambiguation)
