= Hildegardes Vianna =

Hildegardes Cantonino Vianna
- Born: 31 March 1919; Salvador, Brazil
- Died: 12 June 2005 (aged 86); Salvador, Brazil
- Occupations: Researcher and folklorist

Hildegardes Cantolino Vianna (31 March 1919 – 12 June 2005) was a Brazilian journalist and folklorist, professor at the Federal University of Bahia (UFBA), and General Secretary at the UNESCO Institute of Education, Science, and Culture in Brazil. She is known as "the lady of Brazilian folklore".

== Biography ==
Hildegardes was born on 31 March 1919 in Salvador, the capital city of the Brazilian state Bahia. She was the daughter of Amália Cantolino and of Antônio Vianna, a poet, writer, and folklorist. Hildegardes graduated from the Faculty of Law and from the School of Music and Performing Arts, both at UFBA, and later taught folk dance and musical folklore at the latter. She completed a specialisation in ethnology in Lisbon.

Hildegardes began her career in journalism at the now defunct newspaper O Imparcial (lit. 'The Impartial'). In 1955, she joined the newspaper A Tarde (lit. 'The Evening'), where she published stories and articles weekly for 44 years. Their success led her to publish two books, A Bahia já foi assim (lit. 'Bahia Was Once Like This', 1973) and Antigamente era assim (lit. 'It Was Once Like This', 1979), along with several selected texts. As the most accredited person in the field of Bahian folklore, she was awarded the Silvio Romero medal (a prize for monographs on folklore and popular culture) in 1958.

Hildegardes was the General Secretary of the Bahian Folklore Commission and of the Brazilian Institute of Education, Science, and Culture, an UNESCO agency. She was also a member of the Bahian Council of Cultural Foundation, and a partner and coordinator of the Geographical and Historical Institute of Bahia. She occupied a chair at the Bahia Academy of Letters, to which her collection on Brazilian folklore was donated after her death on 12 June 2005. Her successor at the Academy of Letters is the lyricist José Carlos Capinam.

== Bibliography ==
Titles and their publication years are according to the archives of the Geographical and Historical Institute of Bahia.

- A Proclamação da República na Bahia (lit. 'The Proclamation of the Republic in Bahia', 1955): Hildegarde's first published book.
- Festas de Santos e Santos festejados (lit. 'Feasts of Saints and Celebrated Saints', 1960)
- A Bahia já foi assim (lit. 'Bahia Was Once Like This', 1973): On former characters, facts, and customs of Bahia.
- Antigamente era assim (lit. 'It Was Once Like This', 1979): Narration of events which took place in Bahia until the 1940s, as witnessed by Hildegardes and by her friends.
- Folclore brasileiro (lit. 'Brazilian Folklore', 1981)
- Breve notícia sobre acontecimentos na Bahia do início do século XX (lit. 'Brief News About Events in Bahia in the Early 20th Century', 1983)
- A cozinha baiana: seu folclore, suas receitas (lit. 'Bahian cuisine: its folklore and recipes', 1987): categorised typical Bahian foods, their typical composition, essential cooking utensils, and the superstitions involved in their preparation, in order to preserve their original execution.
- As aparadeiras, as sendeironas, seu folclore (lit. 'The Aparadeiras, the Sendeironas, their Folklore', 1988) (Note: "Aparadeiras" and "sendeironas" are informal words denoting a midwife with no medical qualifications and a despicable woman, respectively.)
