= Aquele Abraço =

Song written and performed by Gilberto Gil

Single by Gilberto Gil
- B-side: "O Má Iaô"
- Released: 1969
- Recorded: 1969
- Genre: Samba
- Length: 4:45
- Label: Philips Records
- Songwriter: Gilberto Gil

"Aquele Abraço" (Portuguese pronunciation: [aˈkeli aˈbɾasu], English: "That Hug") is a song in the samba genre by Brazilian singer-songwriter Gilberto Gil. Written during a period of military dictatorship and cultural censorship in Brazil, the lyrics invoke neighborhoods, landmarks, samba schools and popular culture figures of Rio de Janeiro. It was released as the third track, with an expanded version as track 11, on Gil's third album Gilberto Gil, issued by Universal in 1969. On the tracks, he introduces the song as being "for Dorival Caymmi, João Gilberto and Caetano Veloso," all major Brazilian singer-songwriters.

Gil was inspired to write the song on Ash Wednesday of 1969, his last day before leaving Rio, shortly after he had been released from detention in a military prison in the neighborhood of Realengo, referenced in the song lyrics. Upon his return to his home town of Salvador, he was placed under house arrest, where he developed the melody and instrumentation and made the recordings. Although Gil was exiled to Europe by the summer of 1969, the song became a major hit in Brazil, with an extended stay at the top of the charts, and in August 1970 it was awarded the Golden Dolphin (Golphino d'Ouro) prize from the Sound and Image Museum (Museu da Imagem e do Som) in Rio. However, Gil refused to accept the prize, writing an angry response in the counter-cultural Brazilian journal O Pasquim titled "Rejeito + aceito = rejeito" [reject + accept = reject].

Among the cultural references in the lyrics are the fans of the Flamengo football team, the popular television personality Chacrinha, young girls of the favelas, the samba school Portela, and the Carnaval street parade Banda de Ipanema. In an interview in O Pasquim shortly after his exile, he explained that the song was his way of capturing the joy and happiness he had seen on the streets, which he had not felt for some time--"my intention was really, very simply, to give an embrace to the people of Rio...It was a song of encountering, not leaving." In that same interview, Gil also addressed the controversy of whether he had taken the title phrase "Aquele Abraço" from the popular Rio television personality Lilico. Gil asserted that he had never seen Lilico's show and that the phrase had existed in the Brazilian imagination for a long time, used in the same nostalgic sense that he had invoked in his song.

The song has since achieved an iconic status in Brazilian popular culture and was performed by MPB artists Marisa Monte and Seu Jorge at the closing ceremony of the 2012 Summer Olympics in London, as part of the preview of the 2016 Summer Olympics in Rio de Janeiro.
