= Tanto Tempo =

Studio album by Bebel Gilberto
- Released: 25 April 2000
- Genres: Bossa nova; electronic
- Length: 45:45
- Label: Ziriguiboom
- Producer: Suba

Bebel Gilberto chronology
| De Tarde, Vendo O Mar (1991) | Tanto Tempo (2000) | Tanto Tempo Remixes (2000) |

Professional ratings
Review scores
| Source | Rating |
|---|---|
| AllMusic | 4/5 stars |
| The A.V. Club | B+ |
| DownBeat | 4/5 stars |
| The Guardian | 3/5 stars |
| Muzik | 5/5 stars |
| Pitchfork | 8.4/10 |
| Q | 4/5 stars |

Tanto Tempo (lit. "So Much Time") is an album by Brazilian bossa nova singer Bebel Gilberto. Tanto Tempo was produced by Serbian producer Suba and co-produced by Béco Dranoff for the Ziriguiboom imprint of Crammed Discs. Allegedly, Suba died from smoke inhalation while saving the newly recorded album from a studio fire. The album was included in the book 1001 Albums You Must Hear Before You Die.

Brazilian electronic artist Amon Tobin's "Nova", from the album Permutation, is the backing track of "Samba da Benção".

== Commercial performance ==
In 2011 it was awarded a platinum certification from the Independent Music Companies Association which indicated sales of at least 400,000 copies throughout Europe. As of 2009 it has sold 309,000 copies in United States according to Nielsen SoundScan. and as of 2004 it was reported that it has reached over a million copies sold worldwide.

== Track listing ==
1. "Samba da Bênção" (lyrics: Vinicius de Moraes, music: Baden Powell) - 4:47
2. "August Day Song" (music & lyrics: Bebel Gilberto (Isabel Gilberto de Oliveira), Nina Miranda, Chris Franck) - 4:37
3. "Tanto Tempo" (lyrics: Bebel Gilberto, music: Bebel Gilberto, Suba, Gilberto Gil (sample)) - 3:01
4. "Sem Contenção" (lyrics: Bebel Gilberto, music: Bebel Gilberto, Gerry Arling, Richard Cameron) - 3:10
5. "Mais Feliz" (lyrics: Cazuza (Agenor Miranda Araújo Neto), music: Bebel Gilberto, Dé (André Palmeira Cunha)) - 4:17
6. "Alguém" (lyrics: Bebel Gilberto, Roberto "Béco" Dranoff, music: Bebel Gilberto, Suba) - 4:04
7. "So Nice (Summer Samba)" (lyrics: Paulo Sérgio Valle, Norman Gimbel, music: Marcos Valle) - 3:32
8. "Lonely" (lyrics: Bebel Gilberto, music: Bebel Gilberto, Roberto Garza) - 2:24
9. "Bananeira" (lyrics Gilberto Gil, music: João Donato) - 3:26
10. "Samba e Amor" (music & lyrics: Francisco "Chico" Buarque De Hollanda) - 3:28
11. "Close Your Eyes" (lyrics: Dinho Ouro Preto, Bebel Gilberto, Roberto "Béco" Dranoff, music: Suba, Patricia Ermel) - 4:14
12. "No Return" - 4:45 (Bonustrack) - Included on German "Special Remix Edition"

== Charts ==
| Chart (2004) | Peak position |
|---|---|
| US Independent Albums (Billboard) | 24 |
| US World Albums (Billboard) | 2 |

== Certifications and sales ==
| Region | Certification | Certified units/sales |
|---|---|---|
| Canada (Music Canada) | Gold | 50,000^{^} |
| France (SNEP) | Gold | 140,000 |
| United States | — | 309,000 |
Summaries
| Worldwide | — | 1,000,000 |
^{^} Shipments figures based on certification alone.
