= Louvação =

Studio album by Gilberto Gil
- Released: 1967
- Genre: Bossa Nova, MPB
- Label: Philips
- Producer: João Mello

Gilberto Gil chronology
Louvação (1967)	Gilberto Gil (1968)

Professional ratings
Review scores
Source	Rating
Allmusic	2.5/5 stars
Tom Hull – on the Web	B+

Louvação is the debut album by Gilberto Gil, released in 1967.

== Track listing ==
1. "Louvação" (Gil, Neto) - 3:45
2. "Beira-Mar" (Gil, Caetano Veloso) - 3:54
3. "Lunik 9" (Gil) - 3:04
4. "Ensaio Geral" (Gil) - 1:57
5. "Maria (Me Perdoe, Maria)" (Gil) - 2:37
6. "A Rua" (Gil, Neto) - 3:33
7. "Roda" (Augusto, Gil) - 2:41
8. "Rancho da Rosa Encarnada" (Gil, Neto, Vandre) - 2:38
9. "Viramundo" (Capinan, Gil) - 2:18
10. "Mancada" (Gil) - 2:02
11. "Água de Meninos" (Capinan, Gil) - 4:32
12. "Procissão" (Gil) - 2:38
13. "Minha Senhora" (Gil, Neto) - 3:24
14. "A Moreninha" (Tom Zé) - 2:47
