= Gilberto Gil (1968 album) =

Studio album by Gilberto Gil

Studio album by Gilberto Gil
- Released: 1968
- Genre: Tropicália, MPB
- Length: 30:57
- Label: Philips Records
- Producer: Manoel Barenbein

Gilberto Gil chronology
Louvação (1967)	Gilberto Gil (1968)	Gilberto Gil (1969)

Professional ratings
Review scores
Source	Rating
AllMusic	5/5 stars
MSN Music (Expert Witness)	A−
Tom Hull – on the Web	A−

Gilberto Gil (also commonly referred to as Gilberto Gil (Frevo Rasgado) to differentiate it from Gil's other self-titled releases) is the second studio album by Gilberto Gil, originally released in early 1968. The album features a blending of traditional Brazilian styles such as samba and bossa nova with American rock and roll. It also mixes Rogério Duprat's orchestral arrangements with the electric guitars of Brazilian rock group Os Mutantes.

== Critical reception ==
The album is number 78 on Rolling Stone Brasil's List of 100 greatest Brazilian albums of all time. The magazine also voted the track "Domingo no Parque" as the 11th greatest Brazilian song.

In 2017, Pitchfork placed it at number 99 on the "200 Best Albums of the 1960s" list.

== Track listing ==
All tracks are written by Gilberto Gil, except where noted.

No.	Title	Length
1.	"Frevo Rasgado" (Bruno Ferreira, Gil)	1:53
2.	"Coragem pra Suportar"	2:55
3.	"Domingou" (Gil, Torquato Neto)	2:55
4.	"Marginália Il" (Gil, Neto)	2:39
5.	"Pega a Voga, Cabeludo" (Juan Arcon, Gil)	4:44
6.	"Êle Falava Nisso Todo Dia"	2:33
7.	"Procissão"	2:55
8.	"Luzia Luluza"	4:03
9.	"Pé da Roseira"	3:03
10.	"Domingo no Parque"	3:46
Total length:		30:57

Reissue edition bonus tracks
No.	Title	Length
11.	"Barca Grande"	2:41
12.	"A Coisa Mais Linda Que Existe" (Gil, Neto)	3:59
13.	"Questão de Ordem"	5:31
14.	"A Luta Contra a Lata ou a Falência do Café"	2:49
Total length:		46:22

== Personnel ==
- Gilberto Gil – vocals, acoustic guitar
- Os Mutantes – backing vocals, instrumental backing
- Rogério Duprat – arrangement
