= Ego Tripping =

Ego Tripping may refer to:

- Ego Trippin', a 2008 album by Snoop Dogg
- "Ego Trippin'" (song), a 1986 song by[Ultramagnetic MCs
- "Ego Trippin'" (Part Two), a 1994 song by De La Soul from the album Buhloone Mindstate
- "Ego Trippin'", a song by Mya from her 2008 album Sugar & Spice
- "Ego Tripping (there may be a reason why)", a 1973 poem by Nikki Giovanni

== See also ==
- Ego Tripping at the Gates of Hell, a 2003 album by The Flaming Lips
- Ego Trip (disambiguation)
