= Gilberto Gil (1969 album) =

Studio album by Gilberto Gil

Studio album by Gilberto Gil
- Released: 1969
- Genre: Tropicália, MPB, psychedelic rock, experimental
- Label: Philips Records
- Producer: Manoel Barenbein

Gilberto Gil chronology
Gilberto Gil (1968)	Gilberto Gil (1969)	Copacabana Mon Amour (1970)

Professional ratings
Review scores
Source	Rating
Allmusic	4.5/5 stars
Tom Hull – on the Web	B+

Gilberto Gil (also commonly referred to as Gilberto Gil (Cérebro Eletrônico) to differentiate it from Gil's other self-titled releases) is the third solo album by Gilberto Gil, originally released in 1969. The album was arranged by Rogério Duprat, and has a strong element of psychedelic rock to it, being considered by some to be his most experimental album. Since Gil was not allowed by the Brazilian military dictatorship to leave Salvador, Bahia, before being exiled to London, he recorded vocals and acoustic guitar in Salvador, and Rogério Duprat recorded the other instruments in Rio de Janeiro and São Paulo.

The album has one of Gilberto Gil's most famous songs, "Aquele Abraço".

== Track listing ==
A-Side
No.	Title	Writer(s)	Length
1.	"Cérebro Eletrônico"	Gilberto Gil	3:34
2.	"Volks-Volkswagen Blue"	Gil	3:40
3.	"Aquele Abraço"	Gil	5:23
4.	"17 Léguas e Meia"	Humberto Teixeira	4:14
5.	"A Voz do Vivo"	Caetano Veloso	3:46

B-Side
No.	Title	Writer(s)	Length
6.	"Vitrines"	Gil	3:35
7.	"2001"	Rita Carvalho (Rita Lee), Antônio Martins (Tom Zé)	4:33
8.	"Futurível"	Gil	5:46
9.	"Objeto Semi-identificado"	Gil, Rogério Duarte, Rogério Duprat	5:16

Bonus tracks (CD release)
No.	Title	Writer(s)	Length
10.	"Omã Iaô"	Gil	4:26
11.	"Aquele Abraço" (Alternate version)	Gil	6:59
12.	"Com Medo, Com Pedro" (Demo)	Gil	4:22
13.	"Cultura e Civilização" (Demo)	Gil	16:21
14.	"Queremos Guerra" (featuring Caetano Veloso and Jorge Ben)	Ben	3:17
