= José Carlos Capinam =

Brazilian writer (born 1941)

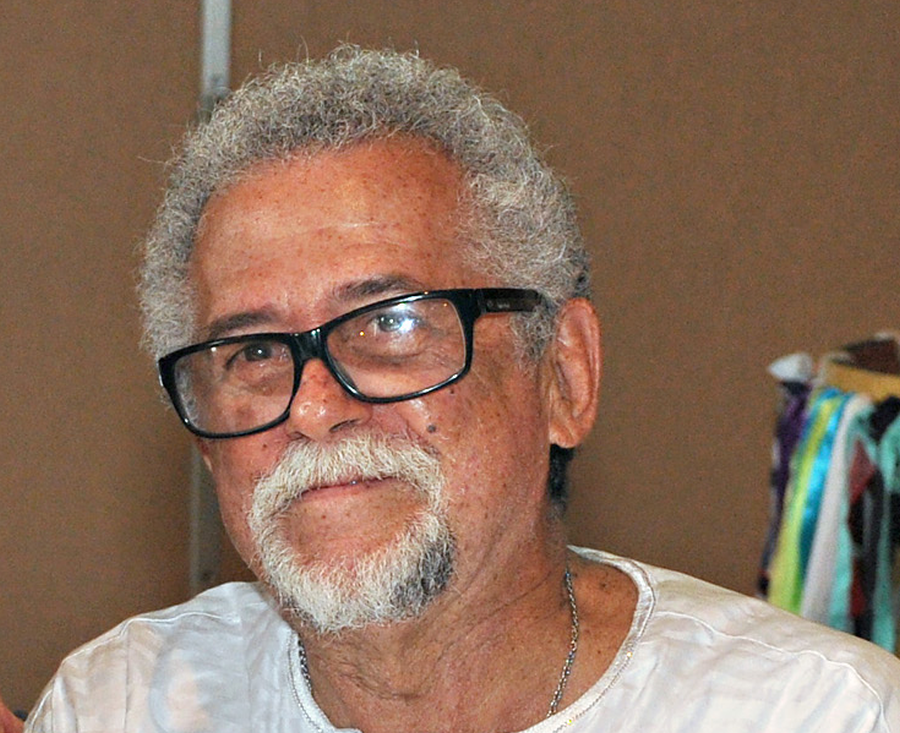
José Carlos Capinam in 2010

José Carlos Capinam (born 19 February 1941), better known as Capinam or Capinan, is a Brazilian poet, lyricist, and member of the Bahia Academy of Letters. He became nationally known for his songwriting in Brazilian popular music (MPB). In the 1960s he became active in Brazil's tropicália movement alongside figures such as Caetano Veloso and Gilberto Gil, the movement's main ideologues.

== Biography ==
Capinam was born in Entre Rios, Bahia, in 1941. At 19, he moved to Salvador, the capital of Bahia and attended the Federal University of Bahia (UFBA), where he studied law. At university, he was a member of the National Student Union and befriended musicians Gilberto Gil (who was studying business) and Caetano Veloso (who was studying philosophy). The 1964 military coup d'état forced him to leave Salvador, and he relocated to São Paulo. There, he worked on poems for his first book, Inquisitórial, before eventually returning to Salvador to study medicine.

In 2000 he composed the opera Rei Brasil 500 Anos with Fernando Cerqueira and Paul Gold to celebrate the 500th anniversary of Brazil's discovery. In 2006 he became the first MPB composer to join the Bahia Academy of Letters, succeeding Hildegardes Vianna.

== Songs ==
He has co-written songs with Gilberto Gil, Caetano Veloso, and others:

- Gil: "Viramundo" (on Louvação, 1967); "Ponteio" (com Edu Lobo, destaque do III Festival da Record) "Miserere nóbis" (on Tropicália ou Panis et Circencis, 1968), "Soy loco por tí, América" (recorded by Veloso on Caetano Veloso, 1968)
- Veloso: "Clarice" (on Caetano Veloso, 1968); "The Empty Boat" (on Álbum Branco, 1969)
- Paulinho da Viola: "Canção para Maria"
- Paulinho da Viola: "Coração Imprudente" (on A Dança do Solidão 1972)
