= Gil Luminoso =

Studio album by Gilberto Gil
- Released: 1 July 2006
- Recorded: 1999
- Length: 1:01:59
- Label: DRG Records Incorporated

Gilberto Gil chronology
Soul of Brazil (2005)	Gil Luminoso (2006)	Rhythms of Bahia (2006)

Gil Luminoso is a 2006 album by Brazilian musician Gilberto Gil, performed using only voice and acoustic guitar. It is composed of songs written by Gil from the late 1960s to the 1990s.

== Conception and themes ==
The idea for the album was conceived of by Bené Fonteles, the album's producer and the author of a book about Gil. It was released with the book, entitled GiLuminoso: a po.ética do ser, in 1999. Fonteles intended for the album to be heavily influenced by spirituality and mysticism and Gil calls it "very religious", though he is an agnostic.

== Compositions ==
"Preciso aprender a só ser" ("I have to learn how to just be") borrows its lyrics and theme from another song titled "I have to learn how to be alone". Gil says that a specific line in the song, "It's just me with this pain in my chest/Collapsing in tears that I try to hide", is an interpretation of suffering in human life. Julie McCarthy, a critic for National Public Radio, called this "an existential theme" which is often present in his lyrics. Another song featured on the album, "Copo vazio" ("Empty glass"), was written by Gil for famous Brazilian musician Chico Buarque. Gil composed the song "Cérebro eletrônico" ("Electronic brain") during his imprisonment by the Brazilian military government in 1969.

== Reception ==
Professional ratings
Review scores
Source	Rating
Allmusic	4/5 stars

The album reached number 15 on the Billboard Top World Albums chart for one week and was nominated for the 2008 Grammy Award for Best Contemporary World Music Album. Gil promoted the album with a 2007 tour of North America which included a performance at Carnegie Hall.

Jon Pareles of The New York Times described Gil Luminoso as "a lovely album", writing in particular on the philosophical qualities of its lyrics. Washington Post critic Mike Joyce noted that the album's lyrics "are often as thoughtful as they are poetic" and praised its arrangements as well, calling them "alluring and revealing". Writing for Allmusic, Jeff Tamarkin called the album "one of the most intimate recordings [Gil] has ever made".

== Track listing ==
1. Preciso aprender a só ser – 4:43
2. Aqui e agora – 5:47
3. Copo vazio – 4:31
4. Retiros espirituais – 5:31
5. O seu amor – 2:10
6. Tempo rei – 5:58
7. O som da pessoa – 1:24
8. Cérebro eletrônico – 5:16
9. A raça humana – 4:26
10. Você e você – 3:51
11. Super-Homem - a canção – 3:40
12. Rebento – 5:35
13. Metáfora – 4:14
14. Meditação – 1:51
15. O compositor me disse – 3:01

== Credits ==
All information taken from album liner notes.

- Producer: Bené Fonteles
- Arrangements and musical direction: Gilberto Gil
- Engineer: Mário Possollo
- Mastering: Sérgio Murilo
- Rehearsal photography: Mario Crovo Neto
- Color photography: Priscila Casaes Franco
- Graphics and printing: Bené Fonteles
- Electronic editing: Arthur Fróes
- Production assistant: Julia Savino
