= Bim-Bom =

Bossa nova song by João Gilberto

"Bim Bom"

Song by João Gilberto
- Recorded: July 1958
- Genre: Bossa nova
- Label: Odeon Records
- Composer(s): João Gilberto

"Bim Bom" (Portuguese pronunciation: [bĩ bõ]) is considered the first bossa nova song. It was composed by João Gilberto around 1956. The song wasn't recorded until July 1958 when Gilberto released it under Odeon Records along with his version of the first produced bossa nova song, "Chega de Saudade", which had been released by Elizete Cardoso earlier that year.

Gilberto wrote the song on the banks of the São Francisco river as he watched laundresses passing by, balancing loads on their heads. Inspired by the swaying of their steps, Gilberto reproduced their rhythm with "Bim-Bom".

The only lyrics of the song, apart from Bim-bom-bim, are roughly translated as This is all of my song / And there's nothing more / My heart has asked that it be this way. Bossa nova would come to be known for the relaxed simplicity of its lyrics as is exemplified in "Bim-Bom".
