= Extra (Gilberto Gil album) =

Studio album by Gilberto Gil
- Released: 1983
- Genre: MPB, Latin music, Latin pop
- Label: WEA

Gilberto Gil chronology
Um Banda Um (1982)	Extra (1983)	Quilombo (Trilha Sonora) (1984)

Professional ratings
Review scores
Source	Rating
AllMusic	4/5 stars
The Encyclopedia of Popular Music	3/5 stars
The Rolling Stone Album Guide	4/5 stars

Extra is an album by Brazilian singer and composer Gilberto Gil, released in 1983. The album, like much of Gil's '80s work, was influenced by reggae.

== Track listing ==
- all tracks were written by Gilberto Gil, except where indicated
1. "Extra"
2. "E lá poeira" (Banda Um, Gilberto Gil)
3. "Mar de Copacabana"
4. "A linha e o linho"
5. "Preciso de você"
6. "Punk da periferia"
7. "Funk-se quem puder"
8. "Dono do pedaço" (Gilberto Gil, Waly Salomão, Antônio Cícero)
9. "Lady Neyde" (Antônio Risério, Gilberto Gil)
10. "O veado"

== Factsheet ==
- Cover: Pictures (front and back cover): Marisa Alvarez Lima
- Illustrations (front and back cover): Antonio Homobono
- Illustrations (internal): Jejo Cornelses e Ricky Bols
- Logo and Art Direction: Rique Nitzsche
- Arts: Maysa Manzo e Dulce Bittencourt
- Graphic Production LP: Ao Lápis Estúdio

== Personnel ==
Band Um

- Bass: Rubens Sabino
- Drum Wilson Meirelles
- Percussion: Repolho
- Guitar: Celso Fonseco
- Keyboards and Vocals: Gerson Santos; Jorjão Barreto
- Saxophone and Flute: Beto Saroldi
- Vocals: Nara Gil e Neila Carneiro
