= Extra Magazine =

Italian weekly magazine

Extra Magazine is an Italian weekly magazine of news, politics and culture. The magazine was established by Rosa Colucci and Francesco Mastrovito in 2006. The headquarters is in Taranto.
