= Egotrip (band) =

Brazilian pop/rock band

Egotrip

Egotrip was a Brazilian pop/rock band.

== History ==
Bassist Arthur Maia — who had previously worked with MPB veterans such as Gal Costa, Caetano Veloso, Roberto Carlos, Djavan, and Milton Nascimento — founded Egotrip in 1985. Their self-titled debut album was released in 1987. The song "Viagem ao Fundo do Ego" became a huge hit shortly after, when it was included in the soundtrack of Rede Globo's telenovela Mandala. Another great success of the group was the song "Kamikaze", that reached the top of several radios of Brazil at that time.

Egotrip would not last long, however: they disbanded after drummer Pedro Gil (Gilberto Gil's son) died in a car crash in 1990.

== Line up ==
- Arthur Maia (bass, vocals, keyboard)
- Nando Chagas (vocals, guitar, keyboard)
- José Rubens (saxophone, keyboard)
- Francisco Frias (guitar, synth guitar, keyboard, arranging and computer programming)
- Pedro Gil (drums, keyboard)

== Discography ==
- Egotrip - 1987
