= Tropicália ou Panis et Circencis =

Studio album by various artists
- Released: July 1968
- Recorded: May 1968
- Studios: RGE Studios, São Paulo, Brazil
- Genres: Tropicália; baroque pop; art-pop
- Length: 38:29
- Label: Philips
- Producer: Manuel Barenbein

Professional ratings
Review scores
Source	Rating
AllMusic	5/5 stars
Spin Alternative Record Guide	9/10

Tropicália ou Panis et Circencis (Latin for Bread and circuses) is a 1968 collaboration album by artists including Gilberto Gil, Caetano Veloso, Tom Zé, Nara Leão, Os Mutantes and Gal Costa. Considered an important record in the Tropicália movement and in the history of Brazilian music, it features orchestral arrangements by Rogerio Duprat and lyrical contributions from Torquato Neto.

== Cover ==
The main contributors can be seen on the album cover, which is intended to be a tribute to influential Beatles album Sgt. Pepper's Lonely Hearts Club Band. Seated on the floor, Gilberto Gil holds the graduation photo of Capinan. To the left, holding a chamber pot, is Rogério Duprat. To the right, Gal Costa, wearing a yellow dress, is beside Torquato Neto, with a cap. Caetano Veloso is to the left of them, holding a picture of Nara Leão. Behind them are Tom Zé, on the right, and Os Mutantes, on the left (more precisely, from left to right, Arnaldo Baptista, Rita Lee and Sérgio Dias).

== Influence ==
It is considered to be the manifesto of the Tropicalismo movement. It is number 2 on Rolling Stone's list of 100 greatest Brazilian albums of all time. The song "Baby" and the title track were voted by the Brazilian edition of Rolling Stone, respectively, as the 30th and the 7th greatest Brazilian song. In September 2012, it was elected by the audience of Radio Eldorado FM, of Estadao.com e of Caderno C2+Música (both the latter belong to newspaper O Estado de S. Paulo) as the ninth best Brazilian album ever. At the time of the album's release, the newspaper also considered it one of the best albums released that year in Brazil."

== Track listing ==
Side one
No.	Title	Writer(s)	Performer	Length
1.	"Miserere nóbis"	Gilberto Gil; Capinam	Gil; Os Mutantes	3:42
2.	"Coração materno"	Vicente Celestino	Caetano Veloso	4:15
3.	"Panis et circensis"	Gil; Veloso	Os Mutantes	3:33
4.	"Lindonéia"	Gil; Veloso	Nara Leão	2:13
5.	"Parque industrial"	Tom Zé	Gil; Gal Costa; Veloso; Os Mutantes	3:16
6.	"Geléia geral"	Gil; Torquato Neto	Gil	3:42

Side two
No.	Title	Writer(s)	Performer	Length
1.	"Baby"	Veloso	Costa; Veloso	3:31
2.	"Três caravelas"	Augusto Algueró Jr.; Guardia Moreu; João de Barro	Veloso; Gil	3:06
3.	"Enquanto seu lobo não vem"	Veloso	Veloso; Costa; Rita Lee	2:31
4.	"Mamãe, coragem"	Veloso; Neto	Gal Costa	2:29
5.	"Bat macumba"	Gil; Veloso	Gil; Os Mutantes; Costa; Veloso	2:33
6.	"Hino do Senhor do Bom Fim"	João Antonio Wanderley; Artur de Sales	Veloso; Gil; Os Mutantes; Costa	3:38
Total length:				38:29

== Personnel ==
- Rogério Duprat: arrangement and conducting
