= Quanta Live =

Quanta gente veio ver: Ao Vivo

Live album by Gilberto Gil
- Released: 4 August 1998
- Recorded: 1997
- Venue: Teatro João Caetano
- Genre: tropicalia, samba, funk, bossa nova, reggae, jazz, salsa, pop
- Length: 1:05
- Language: Portuguese, English
- Label: Mesa/Atlantic
- Producer: Gilberto Gil

Gilberto Gil chronology
O Viramundo (Ao Vivo) (1998)	Quanta gente veio ver: Ao Vivo (1998)	Me, You, Them (2000)

Quanta gente veio ver: Ao Vivo (English: How many people came to see: Live), known internationally as Quanta Live, is a Grammy-winning 1998 album by Brazilian musician Gilberto Gil recorded live with a seven-piece band at the Teatro João Caetano in Rio de Janeiro during his 1997 world tour. At the 41st Annual Grammy Awards, it won the award for Best World Album. The album's tracks span a number of musical styles, including tropicalia, a genre with which Gil is closely associated, as well as samba, funk, bossa nova, reggae, jazz, salsa, and pop.

== Background and style ==
Quanta gente veio ver: Ao Vivo was recorded at the Teatro João Caetano in Rio de Janeiro, Brazil during his 1997 world tour. It is connected in name and content to his 1997 studio-recorded album Quanta, which included a variety of tracks from different points in his career. Quanta Live is the name of the international release.

Stylistically, Gil's well known association with the tropicalia genre is evident on the album, and its musical content has also been described as including samba, funk, bossa nova, reggae, jazz, salsa, and pop songs and styles.

Most of the songs Gil plays with his seven-person supporting band were written by Gil. Two are covers of popular Bob Marley songs, "Is This Love" and "Stir It Up", one was written by Gordurinha, one by Alberto Ribeiro, and another co-written by Gil, João Barone, Bi Ribeiro, and Herbert Vianna.

Talking about the album in an interview with The Austin Chronicle, Gil said "What I really like to do is pick up the guitar and play, to write a song and sing it, to incorporate elements from all kinds of music. That's why I like Quanta Live. It's everything. It's jazz and samba and reggae and salsa. It's bossa nova and baião. It's everything together. That's what I like."

== Reception ==
Quanta Live has received critical acclaim, and won the Grammy Award for Best World Music Album at the 41st Annual Grammy Awards. Interviewed the following year, Gil expressed that the award was particularly meaningful not only because Quanta was intended to represent a summary of the artist three decades into his career, but also because it was the live version rather than the studio album which won.

Diane Gordon of JazzTimes said that through this performance "one can understand his immense international popularity" and praised the sound quality of the recording, calling it "as exciting as his material". AllMusic's Richard S. Ginell's positive review commented that Gil is "still in possession of a quicksilver voice with a beautiful falsetto, a staccato guitar style that makes his electric model sound like an acoustic, and strikingly original, even quirky tunes". The Austin Chronicle's Mike Quinn said "it's music that makes you want to dance with lyrics that make you think".

== Track listing ==
1. "Introducão" (Gilberto Gil) – 2:34
2. "Palco" (Gil) – 3:58
3. "Is This Love" (Bob Marley) – 4:55
4. "Stir It Up" (Marley) – 4:42
5. "Refavela" (Gil) – 3:56
6. "Vendedor de Caranguejo" (Gordurinha) – 4:08
7. "Quanta" (Gil) – 5:57
8. "Estrela" (Gil) – 4:45
9. "Pela Internet" (Gil) – 4:23
10. "Cérebro Eletrônico" (Gil) – 3:51
11. "Opachorô" (Gil) – 4:19
12. "Copacabana" (Alberto Ribeiro) – 4:49
13. "A Novidade" (João Barone, Gil, Bi Ribeiro, Herbert Vianna) – 5:16
14. "O Gandhi" (Gil) – 3:42
15. "De Ouro E Marfim" (Gil) – 3:54

== Personnel ==
- Gilberto Gil - vocals, acoustic and electric guitars
- Arthur Maia - bass
- Celso Fonseca - acoustic and electric guitars
- Gustavo de Dalva, Leonardo Reis - percussion
- Jorginho Gomes - drums
- Paulo Calasans - keyboards
- Raul Mascarenha - saxophone, flute
