= Orba Squara =

Orba Squara is the stage name of New York-based singer/songwriter Mitch Davis. His song "Perfect Timing (This Morning)" was featured in television commercials for Apple's iPhone. Another song of his, "Brand New Day", appeared on the movie Wedding Daze.

== Life and career ==
Davis has recorded two full-length albums, Sunshyness and The Trouble With Flying. Davis uses many "organic" instruments on the album. These include mandolin, glockenspiel, accordion, sitar, violin, harmonica, toy pianos, xylophone and ukulele. Not only were all the songs written by Davis, but he performed everything on the recordings himself. Davis instigated interest in his music by giving copies of his album to friends, who in turn passed it along. It reached Universal Music Publishing through word of mouth.

Davis has been called "the new Moby" in the press because 9 songs from the 10 song debut album "Sunshyness" have been licensed for film and television projects. This fact makes Orba Squara's "Sunshyness" the most licensed album since Moby's 1999 release, "Play." Davis and the "Sunshyness" album have been credited with sparking the current trend of happy glockenspiel and bell melodies layered over simple bouncy guitar rhythms. A sound beginning with Apple's use of "Perfect Timing" in the original iPhone commercials and which style is now heard in movies, television and music everywhere. For his second album, "The Trouble With Flying", Davis managed to enlist the talents of his childhood rock idol, Billy Squier. Squier's involvement breaks the Orba Squara mold of the "one man band" by contributing additional guest vocals and guitar work to two of the 13 songs on the release.

Squier and Davis have continued their musical collaboration by recording new "Billy Squier" songs together. As of this writing, there have been three new Billy Squier songs recorded; "What If I Told You", "Somebody Loves You" and "When She Comes To Me."
