= Extras (2001 film) =

2001 film by Zhu Chuanming

- Directed by: Zhu Chuanming
- Release date: 2001
- Country: China
- Language: Chinese

Extras (Chinese: 群众演员; pinyin: qúnzhòng yǎnyuán) is a 2001 fly on the wall Chinese documentary film by director Zhu Chuanming. The documentary has been seen as tinged with social criticism in its observation of the lives and dreams of China's poorly paid film extras.
