= Extra (supermarket) =

German supermarket chain

extra,- ein Unternehmen der REWE Deutscher Supermarkt KGaA
- Type: KGaA
- Industry: Retail
- Founded: 1970
- Defunct: 2009
- Headquarters: Cologne, Germany
- Products: food & nonfood
- Number of employees: 9700
- Website: Extra Verbrauchermärkte (Archived, now redirects to Sparstrom.de)

Extra was a retail chain in the German food sector that was part of REWE Group from July 1, 2008, til it ceased to exist in 2009. The company was previously among Metro Group. In the northern half of Germany, Extra served as a main provider of food.

== Company history ==
The first extra store was opened by the Schaper-Group in Düren in 1970. In the early years, the main part of the branch network was in Lower Saxony and North Rhine Westphalia. Extra was integrated into the Asko-Group in 1987, which in turn has been part of Metro Group since 1986. The two sales lines real,- and Extra had been merged by Metro Group in 2004, though they continued to appear as two separate brands in the market. The Metro Group sold Extra to the REWE Group on 1. July 2008. The brand name Extra was announced to be phased out in 2009 and the stores renamed REWE. The franchise markets Comet and Bolle that belong to Extra kept their names initially.

To facilitate the sale of Extra, the Metro Group split the two companies Real,- and Extra. The entity's name was then changed to extra Objektgesellschaft mbH. After the sale of extra, the "TiP" products disappear from the markets and are replaced by "Ja!", "REWE" and "REWE Bio" products, the marchandises of the REWE Group.

== Products on offer ==
- Food
- Clothes
- Crockery
- Electrical equipment
- Toys

1000 commodities were sold under the private labels Ja! REWE and REWE Bio. These commodities come from the REWE Group

== Locations ==
Extra stores were found in towns with more than 8000 inhabitants. They were located centrally and offered convenient parking facilities. The 252 stores were in Northrhine-Westphalia, Rhineland-Palatinate, Lower Saxony and Berlin and measured about 2000–3000 m^{2}. Smaller stores were 800–1000 m^{2} and usually belonged to extra Franchise (Comet and Bolle). These franchise stores were delivered by Extra, but their brands were not presented jointly to the market. Separate slogans were used and their own leaflets distributed.

== Self scanning terminals ==
Besides the regular cash registers, Extra launched Self scanning terminals in 2007. At four terminals, customers scanned their purchases themselves and put them into a plastic bag. The weight of the commodities was scanned to avoid fraud. A sale assistant controlled the operations on a computer. If there was a customer who wanted to buy alcohol or cigarettes, the assistant verified the age of the person. An alarm fuse would stop thieves. After the sale of Extra, these terminals disappeared from the markets and were replaced by "normal" cash registers.

== Links ==
- Official Website (2005 link, archived by the Wayback Machine)
- Official Website (2021 link, now redirects to Sparstrom.de)
