= All in One (Bebel Gilberto album) =

Studio album by Bebel Gilberto
- Released: 2009
- Genre: Bossa nova, downtempo
- Label: Verve Records

Bebel Gilberto chronology
Momento (2007)	All in One (2009)

Professional ratings
Review scores
Source	Rating
AllMusic	4/5 stars

All in One is a studio album by Bebel Gilberto, released on 29 August 2009 by Verve Records.

== Track listing ==
1. "Canção de Amor" (Bebel Gilberto, Masa Shimizu) – 4:26
2. "Sun Is Shining" (Gilberto, Bob Marley) – 3:56
3. "Bim-Bom" (João Gilberto) – 2:43
4. "Nossa Senhora" (Carlinhos Brown, Paulo Levita) – 3:25
5. "The Real Thing" (Stevie Wonder) – 4:33
6. "Ela (On My Way)" (Brown, Gilberto) – 3:19
7. "Far From the Sea" (Robertinho Brant, Emerson Pena) – 3:22
8. "All in One" (Gilberto, Cézar Mendes) – 4:24
9. "Forever" (Gilberto) - 2:29
10. "Secret (Segredo)" (Thomas Bartlett, Gilberto) – 3:44
11. "Chica Chica Boom Chic" (Mack Gordon, Harry Warren) – 3:05
12. "Port Antonio" (Gilberto, Didi Gutman) - 3:49

== Weekly charts ==
Chart (2009)	Peak position
US Heatseekers Albums (Billboard)	33
US World Albums (Billboard)	3

== Personnel ==
- Pedro Baby – acoustic guitar
- Thomas Bartlett – piano, bass guitar, fender rhodes, effects
- Magrus Borges – drums, caxixi, engineer, shaker
- Tom Brenneck – guitar, tambourine, producer, engineer, vibraphone
- Carlinhos Brown – synthesizer, acoustic Guitar, percussion, bongos, conga, drums, electric guitar, programming, timbales, triangle, vocals, claves, surdo, producer, agogo, cajon, shaker, sounds, sapo, blocks, loop, timbaus, tamborim, effects, hi hat, afoxe, apito, boca, sementes
- Mario C. – programming, producer, mixing
- Dahlia Ambach Caplin – A&R
- Greg Cohen – acoustic bass, string arrangements
- Christina Courtin – violin
- Didiê Cunha – engineer, executive producer
- Carlos Darci – trombone, cavaquinho, cuica, tamborim
- Mike Deller – assistant engineer
- Patrick Dillett – engineer, mixing
- Emery Dobyns – engineer
- Johnny Gandelsman – violin
- Wladmir Gasper – engineer
- Cochemea Gastelum – flute
- Clark Gayton – tuba, bass trombone, tenor trombone
- Henrique Gendre – photography
- Bebel Gilberto – vocals, producer, vocal arrangement, string arrangements, flute arrangement, whistle
- Didi Gutman – synthesizer, bass, guitar, piano, strings, keyboards, programming, producer, loop, effects, moog bass, ambience
- Dave Guy – flugelhorn
- Christopher Hoffman – cello
- Clay Wells Holley – engineer, mixing
- Daniel Jobim – piano, vocals, producer, moog bass
- Aaron J. Johnson – trombone
- Hollis King – creative director
- John King – synthesizer, programming, producer, engineer, mixing, synthesizer bass, sounds, effects
- Paulo Levita – acoustic guitar
- Zé Luis – flute, flute arrangement
- Cézar Mendes – acoustic guitar
- Vaughan Merrick – digital editing
- Guilherme Monteiro – cavaquinho
- Davi Moraes – sitar
- Nick Movshon – bass
- UE Nastasi – mastering
- Mark Ronson – producer
- Masa Shimizu – acoustic guitar
- Homer Steinweiss – drums
- Fernando Velez – conga
