= Bebel Gilberto (album) =

Studio album by Bebel Gilberto
- Released: 2004
- Genre: Bossa nova; future jazz; downtempo
- Label: Ziriguiboom

Bebel Gilberto chronology
Tanto Tempo (2000)	Bebel Gilberto (2004)	Momento (2007)

Professional ratings
Review scores
Source	Rating
AllMusic	4/5 stars

Bebel Gilberto is an album by Brazilian bossa nova singer Bebel Gilberto.

== Track listing ==
1. "Baby" - 3:49
2. "Simplesmente" - 4:49
3. "Aganjú" - 4:44
4. "All Around" - 4:44
5. "River Song" - 4:57
6. "Every Day You've Been Away" - 4:05
7. "Cada Beijo" - 4:26
8. "O Caminho" - 2:59
9. "Winter" - 4:19
10. "Céu Distante" - 2:58
11. "Jabuticaba" - 3:02
12. "Next to You" - 2:54

== Weekly charts ==
Chart (2004)	Peak position
US Billboard 200	154
US Independent Albums (Billboard)	8
US Heatseekers Albums (Billboard)	5
US World Albums (Billboard)	1

As of 2005 it has sold 101,000 copies in United States according to Nielsen SoundScan. In 2011 it was awarded a gold certification from the Independent Music Companies Association which indicated sales of at least 75,000 copies throughout Europe.
