= Bebel Gilberto =

Brazilian singer (born 1966)

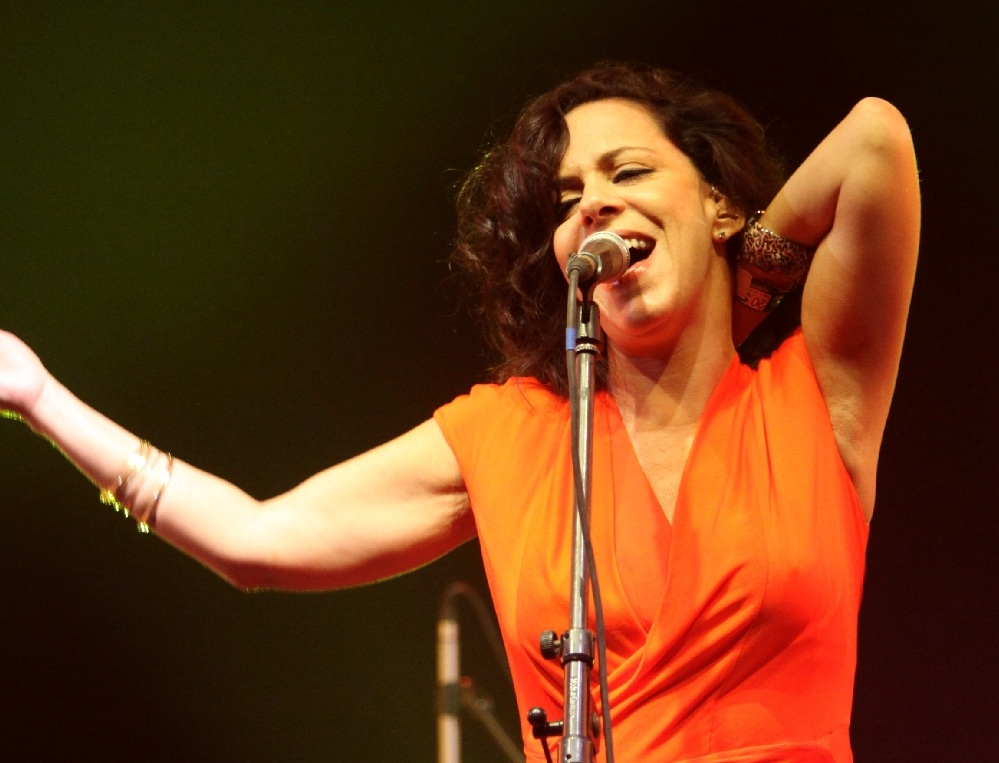
- Bebel Gilberto performing in 2012

Background information
- Born: Isabel Buarque de Hollanda Gilberto de Oliveira; May 12, 1966 (age 60); New York City, U.S.
- Origin: Rio de Janeiro, Brazil
- Genres: Bossa nova; música popular brasileira; samba; Latin pop; chill out; downtempo
- Occupation: Singer
- Instrument: Vocals
- Years active: 1977–present
- Labels: Ziriguiboom, EastWest, Verve
- Website: www.bebelgilberto.com

Isabel Buarque de Hollanda Gilberto de Oliveira (born May 12, 1966), known as Bebel Gilberto, is a Brazilian popular singer often associated with bossa nova. She is the daughter of João Gilberto and singer Miúcha. Her uncle is singer and composer Chico Buarque.

== Early life ==
Gilberto was born in New York City to Brazilian parents, bossa nova pioneer João Gilberto and singer Miúcha, who were briefly living in the city at the time of her birth. She often traveled with her father when he recorded albums in different countries; she lived in Mexico at age three and moved to Rio de Janeiro at age five. Gilberto's parents separated when she was seven, and she spent her time between Rio de Janeiro with her mother and New York with her father. Gilberto has been performing since her youth in Rio de Janeiro.

Gilberto recalls that her childhood was "music nonstop"; when reflecting on her father's influence, Gilberto states, "He taught me to be a perfectionist. But my mother taught me how to lose it. And you can hear it in my music today, I think." She grew acquainted with popular artists such as Caetano Veloso, David Byrne, and Stan Getz, who often visited her father's home to collaborate. She began singing with her mother at a young age and participated in professional musicals such as Saltimbancos and Pirlimpimpim. At the age of seven, she made her recording debut on her mother's first solo album, Miúcha & Antônio Carlos Jobim (1977). Two years later, she performed at Carnegie Hall with her mother and Stan Getz.

== Career ==
=== Beginnings: 1986–1999 ===
Gilberto's professional solo debut came in 1986 with a self-titled EP released by WEA which included "Preciso dizer que te amo", a partnership with Cazuza and Dé Palmeira, when both were in the Barão Vermelho band. In 1991, Gilberto moved to Manhattan, where she continues to live, but shares her time between the U.S. and Brazil.

Gilberto was a great friend of Cazuza and composed several songs with him in addition to "Eu preciso dizer que te amo", including "Amigos de Bar", "Mais Feliz", and "Mulher sem Razão".

Gilberto next participated in the project Red Hot + Rio, joining major music stars such as Everything but the Girl, Maxwell, George Michael, and others for the benefit CD recording. She also collaborated on Towa Tei's CD Future Listening!, singing on the hits "Technova" and "Batucada," and also participated in Peeping Tom with Mike Patton (lead singer of Faith No More), singing "Caipirinha".

=== Tanto Tempo, Bebel Gilberto, and Momento: 2000–2007 ===
Tanto Tempo, an electronic bossa nova album released in 2000, was popular at clubs around the world and positioned Gilberto as one of the best-selling Brazilian artists in the U.S. since the 1960s. With her second album, Bebel Gilberto (2004), she refined her sound to create an acoustic lounge style that showcased her strengths as a Brazilian composer.

With Momento (2007), her third album in seven years, she wanted to do a fusion of both. Mixing the taste of Rio's Orquestra Imperial with the melting pot of New York's Brazilian Girls, and following the direction of the English producer Guy Sigsworth (Madonna's partner in "What It Feels Like for a Girl"), Momento reaffirmed the international character of Gilberto's music. In 2007, she was a judge for the 6th annual Independent Music Awards to support independent artists' careers.

=== All in One: 2009–present ===
Gilberto recorded her fourth studio album, All in One, in New York, Jamaica, and the Brazilian state of Bahia. It was released worldwide on September 29, 2009, on the American jazz label Verve, and was released in Brazil by Universal Music. It is the least electronic-infused of her albums, and brings to the forefront more of Gilberto's personality and love for organic styles. All in One had a team of accomplished producers including Mark Ronson (Amy Winehouse, Lily Allen), John King (Dust Brothers, Beck), Daniel Jobim, Carlinhos Brown, Didi Gutman (Brazilian Girls) and Mario Caldato Jr (Beastie Boys, Björk, Jack Johnson). Gilberto also provided the voice of the bird Eva in the animated film Rio (2011), an experience she called "amazing".

Since the launch of Tanto Tempo in 2000, she has sold over 2.5 million records and has been featured on seven film soundtracks including Next Stop Wonderland, The Bubble, Closer and most recently 2010s Eat Pray Love and 2011's Rio; and seven TV series including Sex and the City, Six Feet Under, and Nip/Tuck.

In 2011, she contributed a cover of "Acabou Chorare" to the Red Hot Organization's most recent charitable album, Red Hot+Rio 2. The album is a follow-up to the 1996 Red Hot+Rio. Proceeds from the sales will be donated to raise awareness and money to fight AIDS/HIV and related health and social issues. In 2015, her song "Tudo" was nominated for the 16th Latin Grammy Awards in the Best Brazilian Song category.

== Discography ==
=== Studio albums ===
- Um Certo Geraldo Pereira, Funarte (with Pedrinho Rodrigues) (1983, Atração)
- De Tarde, Vendo O Mar (with Luizão Maia & Banzai) (1991)
- Tanto Tempo (2000) Ziriguiboom
- Bebel Gilberto (2004) Ziriguiboom
- Momento (2007) Ziriguiboom
- All in One (2009) Verve Records
- Tudo (2014) Sony
- Agora (2020)
- João (2023)

=== Remix albums ===
- Tanto Tempo Remixes (2001) Ziriguiboom
- Tanto Tempo (Special Remix Edition) (2003) EastWest Records
- Bebel Gilberto Remixed (2005) Ziriguiboom

=== EPs ===
- Bebel Gilberto (EP) (1986) Warner Jazz
- Bring Back The Love — Remixes EP 1 (2007) [digital-only]
- Bring Back The Love — Remixes EP 2 (2007) [digital-only]
- Live Session (iTunes Exclusive) – EP (2008) [digital-only]

== Filmography ==
- Pirlimpimpim (1982 TV movie)- Narizinho
- Malandro (1986)- Bebel
- The Color of Destiny (1987)
- Elis Regina Tribute Live at Town hall (1998 video short)- Singer, Performer
- Rio (2011) – Eva (voice)
- Kings & Rats (2012)- Banda
- Rio 2 (2014) – Eva (voice)
- Rio, I Love You (2014) - Cupido (segment "Acho que Estou Apaixonado")
