= Momento (album) =

Studio album by Bebel Gilberto
- Released: 3 April 2007
- Genres: Bossa nova, downtempo
- Label: Ziriguiboom

Bebel Gilberto chronology
Bebel Gilberto (2004)	Momento (2007)	All in One (2009)

Professional ratings
Review scores
Source	Rating
AllMusic	3/5 stars

Momento is an album by Brazilian bossa nova singer Bebel Gilberto.

== Track listing ==
1. "Momento" - 5:16
2. "Bring Back the Love" - 4:29
3. "Close to You" - 3:20
4. "Os Novos Yorkinos" - 3:41
5. "Azul" - 3:13
6. "Caçada" - 4:34
7. "Night and Day" - 4:57
8. "Tranquilo" - 4:06
9. "Um Segundo" - 3:12
10. "Cadê Você?" - 3:32
11. "Words" - 2:30

== Weekly charts ==
Chart (2004)	Peak position
US Billboard 200	169
US Independent Albums (Billboard)	20
US Heatseekers Albums (Billboard)	6
US World Albums (Billboard)	4

In 2011 it was awarded a double silver certification from the Independent Music Companies Association which indicated sales of at least 40,000 copies throughout Europe.
