= Gilberto Gil =

Brazilian musician and politician (born 1942)

Gilberto Gil GCIH
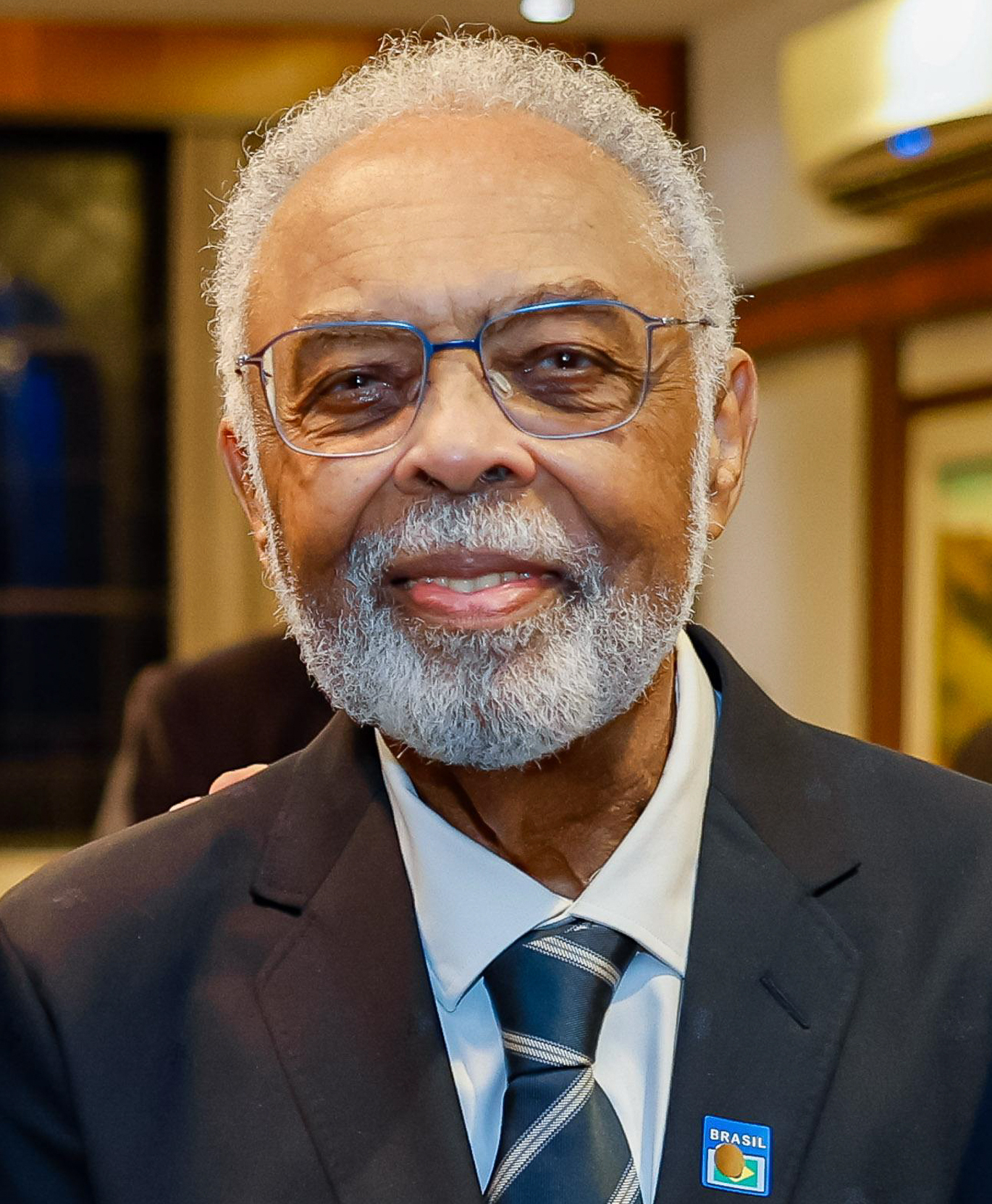
- Gil in 2026
- Born: Gilberto Passos Gil Moreira; 26 June 1942 (age 84); Salvador, Brazil
- Education: Federal University of Bahia (BBA)
- Occupations: Singer; songwriter; politician
- Political party: PMDB (1988–1990); PV (1990–present)
- Spouses: Belina de Aguiar (m. 1965; sep. 1967) Nana Caymmi (m. 1967; sep. 1968) Sandra Gadelha (m. 1969; div. 1980) Flora Giordano (m. 1981)
- Children: 8 (including Preta)
- Musical career
- Genres: MPB; tropicália; world; samba; forró; rock; reggae; experimental
- Instruments: Vocals; guitar; hurdy-gurdy; percussion
- Years active: 1959–present
- Labels: JS Discos; RCA; Phonogram; Polygram Brasil; PolyGram; Philips; WEA; Som Livre; Universal; Sony
- Website: gilbertogil.com.br

Gilberto Passos Gil Moreira (Brazilian Portuguese: [ʒiwˈbɛʁtu ˈʒiw]; born 26 June 1942) is a Brazilian singer-songwriter and politician, known for both his musical innovation and political activism. From 2003 to 2008, he served as Brazil's Minister of Culture in the administration of President Luiz Inácio Lula da Silva. Gil's musical style incorporates an eclectic range of influences, including rock, Brazilian genres including samba, African music, and reggae.

Gil started to play music as a child and was a teenager when he joined his first band. He began his career as a bossa nova musician and began to write songs that reflected a focus on political awareness and social activism. He was a key figure in the música popular brasileira and tropicália movements of the 1960s, alongside artists such as longtime collaborator Caetano Veloso. The Brazilian military regime that took power in 1964 saw both Gil and Veloso as a threat, and the two were held for nine months in 1969 before they were told to leave the country. Gil moved to London, but returned to Bahia in 1972 and continued his musical career, while also working as a politician and environmental advocate. His album Quanta Live won Best World Album at the 41st Annual Grammy Awards, and the album Eletracústico won the Best Contemporary World Music Album at the 48th Annual Grammy Awards.

== Early life (1942–1963) ==
Gil was born in Salvador and spent much of his childhood in Ituaçu. Ituaçu was a small town of fewer than a thousand people, located in the sertão, or countryside, of Bahia. His father, José Gil Moreira, was a doctor; his mother, Claudina Passos Gil Moreira, an elementary school teacher. As a young boy, he attended a Marist Brothers school. Gil remained in Ituaçu until he was nine years old, returning to Salvador for secondary school.

Gil's interest in music was precocious: "When I was only two or two and a half", he recalled, "I told my mother I was going to become a musician or president of my country". He grew up listening to the forró music of his native northeast, and took an interest in the street performers of Salvador. Early on, he began to play the drums and the trumpet, through listening to Bob Nelson on the radio. Gil's mother was the "chief supporter" in his musical ambitions; she bought him an accordion and, when he was ten years old, sent him to music school in Salvador which he attended for four years. As an accordionist, Gil first played classical music, but grew more interested in the folk and popular music of Brazil. He was particularly influenced by singer and accordion player Luiz Gonzaga; he began to sing and play the accordion in an emulation of Gonzaga's recordings. Gil has noted that he grew to identify with Gonzaga "because he sang about the world around [him], the world that [he] encountered".

During his years in Salvador, Gil encountered the music of songwriter Dorival Caymmi, who he says represented to him the "beach-oriented" samba music of Salvador. Gonzaga and Caymmi were Gil's formative influences. While in Salvador, Gil was introduced to many other styles of music, including American big band jazz and tango. In 1950 Gil moved back to Salvador with his family. It was there, while in high school, that he joined his first band, Os Desafinados ("The Out of Tunes"), in which he played accordion and vibraphone and sang. Os Desafinados was influenced by American rock and roll musicians like Elvis Presley, as well as singing groups from Rio de Janeiro. The band was active for two to three years. Soon afterwards, inspired by Brazilian musician João Gilberto, he settled on the guitar as his primary instrument and began to play bossa nova.

== Musical career (1963–present) ==
Gilberto Gil and Nana Caymmi in III Popular Music Festival, 1967. National Archives of Brazil

Gil met guitarist and singer Caetano Veloso at the Universidade Federal da Bahia (Federal University of Bahia) in 1963. The two began collaborating and performing together, releasing a single and EP. Along with Maria Bethânia (Veloso's sister), Gal Costa, and Tom Zé, Gil and Veloso performed bossa nova and traditional Brazilian songs at the Vila Velha Theatre's opening night in July 1964, a show entitled Nós, por Exemplo ("Us, for Example"). Gil and the group continued to perform at the venue and he eventually became a musical director of the concert series. Gil collaborated again with members of this collective on the landmark 1968 album Tropicália: ou Panis et Circenses, whose style was influenced by The Beatles' Sgt. Pepper's Lonely Hearts Club Band, an album Gil listened to constantly. Gil describes Tropicália: ou Panis et Circenses as the birth of the tropicália movement. As Gil describes it, tropicália, or tropicalismo, was a conflation of musical and cultural developments that had occurred in Brazil during the 1950s and 1960s—primarily bossa nova and the Jovem Guarda ("Young Wave") collective—with rock and roll music from the United States and Europe, a movement deemed threatening by the Brazilian government of the time.

Early on in the 1960s, Gil earned income primarily from selling bananas in a shopping mall and composing jingles for television advertisements; he was also briefly employed by the Brazilian division of Unilever, Gessy-Lever. He moved to São Paulo in 1965 and had a hit single when his song "Louvação" (which later appeared on the album of the same name) was released by Elis Regina. His first hit as a solo artist was the 1969 song "Aquele Abraço". Gil also performed on several television programs throughout the 1960s, which often included other "tropicalistas", members of the Tropicalismo movement.

=== Imprisonment and exile ===
In October 1968, Gilberto Gil and Caetano Veloso performed at Sucata club in Rio de Janeiro, with Hélio Oiticica's poem-flag Seja marginal, seja herói displayed on stage. The journalist Randal Juliano of RecordTV propagated a story that Caetano and Gil had sung the Brazilian National Anthem in subversive parody. The two musicians were arrested without trial 27 December 1968—shortly after the military state had passed on 13 December Institutional Act Number Five, which suspended habeas corpus.

In February 1969 Gil and Veloso were arrested by the Brazilian military government, brought from São Paulo to Rio de Janeiro, and spent three months in prison and another four under house arrest, before being freed on the condition that they leave the country. Veloso was the first to be arrested; the police moved to Gil's home soon afterward. Veloso had directed his then-wife Andréa Gadelha to warn Gil about the possibility of arrest, but Gil was eventually brought into the police van along with Veloso. They were given no reason or charge for their arrest. Gil believes that the government felt his actions "represent[ed] a threat [to them], something new, something that can't quite be understood, something that doesn't fit into any of the clear compartments of existing cultural practices, and that won't do. That is dangerous." During his prison sentence, Gil began to meditate, follow a macrobiotic diet, and read about Eastern philosophy. He composed four songs during his imprisonment, among them "Cérebro Electrônico" ("Electronic Brain"), which first appeared on his 1969 album Gilberto Gil 1969, and later on his 2006 album Gil Luminoso. Thereafter, Gil and Veloso were exiled to London, England after being offered to leave Brazil. The two played a last Brazilian concert together in Salvador in July 1969, and travelled to Portugal, Paris, and London. He and Veloso took a house in Chelsea, with their wives and manager. Gil was involved in the organisation of the 1971 Glastonbury Free Festival and was exposed to reggae while living in London; he recalls listening to Bob Marley (whose songs he later covered), Jimmy Cliff, and Burning Spear. He was heavily influenced by and involved with the city's rock scene as well, performing with Yes, Pink Floyd, and the Incredible String Band. However, he also performed solo, recording Gilberto Gil (Nêga) while in London. In addition to involvement in the reggae and rock scenes, Gil attended performances by jazz artists, including Miles Davis and Sun Ra.

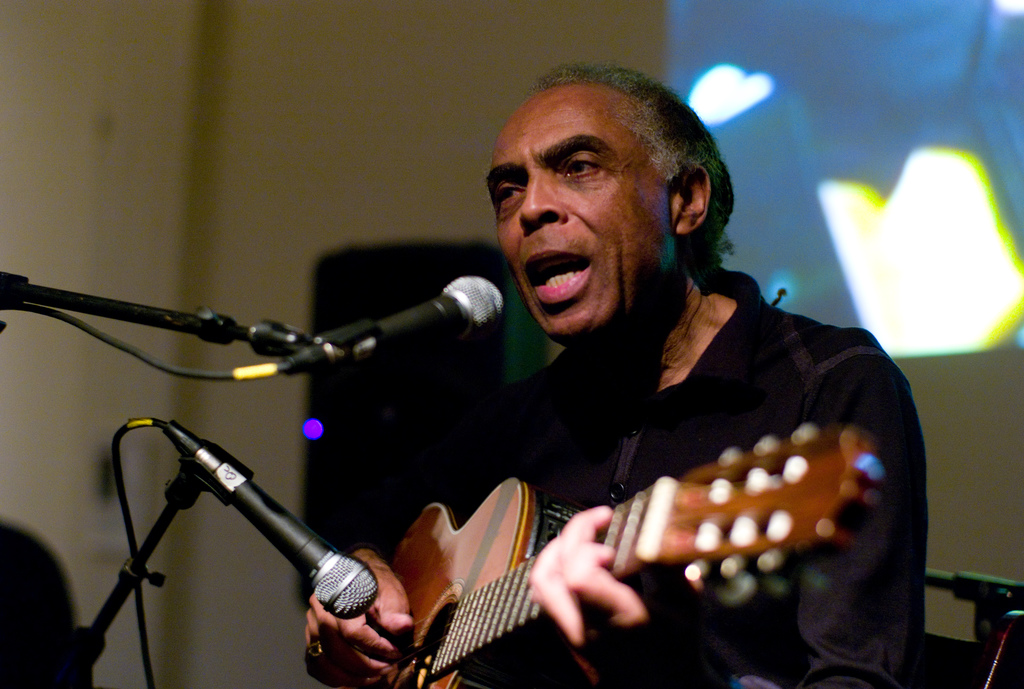
Gilberto Gil performing in 2007

When he went back to Bahia in 1972, Gil focused on his musical career and environmental advocacy work. He released Expresso 2222 the same year, from which two popular singles were released. Gil toured the United States and recorded an English-language album as well, continuing to release a steady stream of albums throughout the 1970s, including Realce and Refazenda. In the early 1970s Gil participated in a resurgence of the Afro-Brazilian afoxé tradition in Carnaval, joining the Filhos de Gandhi ("Sons of Gandhi") performance group, which only allowed black Brazilians to join. Gil also recorded a song titled "Patuscada de Gandhi" written about the Filhos de Gandhi that appeared on his 1977 album Refavela. Greater attention was paid to afoxé groups in Carnaval because of the publicity that Gil had provided to them through his involvement; the groups increased in size as well. In the late 1970s he left Brazil for Africa and visited Senegal, Ivory Coast, and Nigeria. He also worked with Jimmy Cliff and released a cover of "No Woman, No Cry" with him in 1980, a number one hit that introduced reggae to Brazil.

In 1996, Gil contributed "Refazenda" to the AIDS-Benefit Album Red Hot + Rio produced by the Red Hot Organization.

In 1998 the live version of his album Quanta won Gil the Grammy Award for Best World Music Album. In 2005 he won the Grammy Award for Best Contemporary World Music Album for Eletracústico. In May 2005 he was awarded the Polar Music Prize by Carl XVI Gustaf of Sweden in Stockholm, the prize's first Latin American recipient. On 16 October of the same year he received the Légion d'honneur from the government of France, coinciding with the Année du Brésil en France ("Brazil's Year in France").

In 2010 he released the album Fé Na Festa, a record devoted to forró, a style of music from Brazil's northeast. His tour to promote this album received some negative feedback from fans who were expecting to hear a set featuring his hits. In 2013, Gilberto Gil plays his own role as a singer and promoter of cultural diversity in a long feature documentary shot around the southern hemisphere by Swiss filmmaker Pierre-Yves Borgeaud, Viramundo: a musical journey with Gilberto Gil, distributed worldwide. The film also inaugurates the T.I.D.E. experiment for pan-European and multi-support releases.

His album OK OK OK was ranked as the 4th best Brazilian album of 2018 by the Brazilian edition of Rolling Stone magazine and among the 25 best Brazilian albums of the second half of 2018 by the São Paulo Association of Art Critics.

== Political career (1987–present) ==
Gilberto Gil
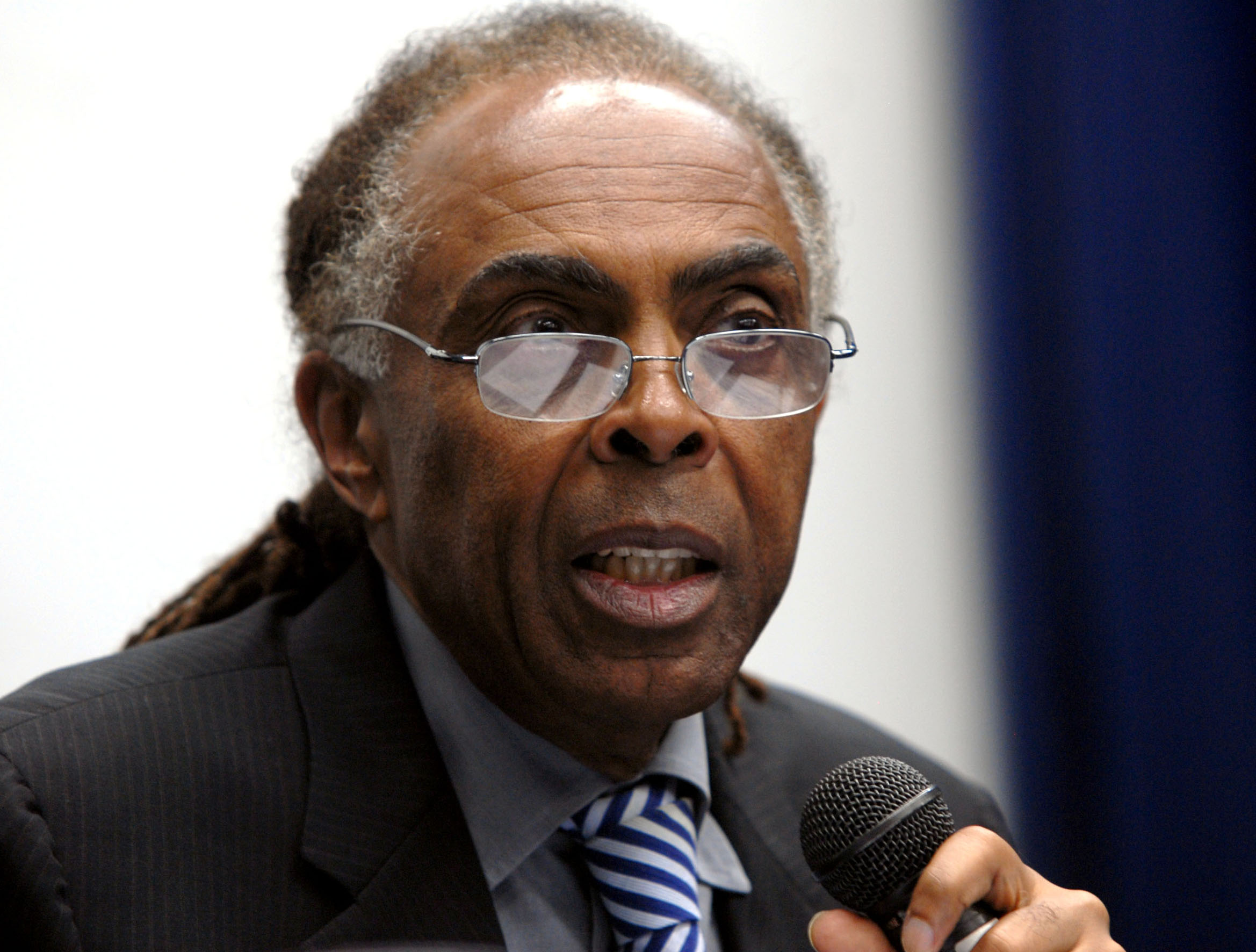
- Gil in 2007

Minister of Culture
- In office 1 January 2003 – 30 July 2008
- President: Luiz Inácio Lula da Silva
- Preceded by: Francisco Weffort
- Succeeded by: Juca Ferreira

Councillor of Salvador
- In office 1 January 1989 – 1 January 1993
- Constituency: At-large

Personal details
- Party: PV (1990–present)
- Other political affiliations: PMDB (1988–90)

Gil describes his attitude towards politics thus: "I'd rather see my position in the government as that of an administrator or manager. But politics is a necessary ingredient." His political career began in 1987, when he was elected to a local post in Bahia and became the Salvador secretary of culture. In 1988, he was elected to the city council and subsequently became city commissioner for environmental protection. However, he left the office after one term and declined to run for the National Congress of Brazil. In 1990, Gil left the Brazilian Democratic Movement Party and joined the Green Party. During this period, Gil founded the environmental protection organization Onda Azul ("Blue Wave"), which worked to protect Brazilian waters. He maintained a full-time musical career at the same time, and withdrew temporarily from politics in 1992, following the release Parabolicamará, considered to be one of his most successful efforts. On 16 October 2001 Gil accepted his nomination to be a Goodwill Ambassador for the Food and Agriculture Organization (FAO) of the United Nations, having promoted the organization before his appointment.

When President Luiz Inácio Lula da Silva took office in January 2003, he chose Gil as Brazil's new Minister of Culture, the second black person to serve in the country's cabinet. The appointment was controversial among political and artistic figures and the Brazilian press; a remark Gil made about difficulties with his salary received particular criticism. Gil had not been a member of Lula's Workers' Party and had not participated in creating its cultural program. Shortly after becoming Minister, Gil began a partnership between Brazil and Creative Commons. In 2003, he gave a concert in the UN General Assembly in honour of the victims of the bombing of the UN headquarters in Baghdad. In that concert, he played together with Secretary General Kofi Annan.

As Minister, he sponsored a program called Culture Points, which gave grants to provide music technology and education to people living in poor areas of the country's cities. Gil asserted that "You've now got young people who are becoming designers, who are making it into media and being used more and more by television and samba schools and revitalizing degraded neighborhoods. It's a different vision of the role of government, a new role." Gil also expressed interest in a program to establish an Internet repository of freely downloadable Brazilian music. Following Gil's appointment, the department's expenditures increased by over 50 percent. In November 2007 Gil announced his intention to resign from his post due to a vocal cord polyp. Lula rejected Gil's first two attempts to resign, but accepted a further request in July 2008. Lula said on this occasion that Gil was "going back to being a great artist, going back to giving priority to what is most important" to him.

== Personal life ==
Gil has been married four times. He had two daughters Nara and Marilia, with first wife Belina Aguiar. He was then married to famous singer Nana Caymmi, they had no children. His third wife was Sandra Gadelha with whom he had three children: Pedro, Preta and Maria. Sandra inspired one of his most beloved songs Drão, she was with him during the very hard times of Brazilian dictatorship and they both were exiled. His fourth wife is Flora Giordano. The couple has three children: Bem, Isabella and Jose. His first son Pedro Gil, Egotrip's drummer – died in a car accident in 1990. Preta Gil, an actress and singer, was his daughter with Sandra Gadelha.

Gil's religious beliefs have changed significantly over his lifetime. Originally, he was a Christian, but was later influenced by Eastern philosophy and religion, and, later, explored African spirituality. He is an agnostic. He practices yoga and is a vegetarian.

Gil has been open about the fact that he has smoked marijuana for much of his life. He has said he believes "that drugs should be treated like pharmaceuticals, legalized, although under the same regulations and monitoring as medicines".

In 2018, a species of caecilian amphibian, Rhinatrema gilbertogili, was named after Gil to honor his musical career and contributions to environmental protection projects. Like Gil, the caecilian is native to Brazil.

In 2023, Gil revealed that he had also been in relationships with men, stating "We are all bisexual".

== Musical style and influences ==
"Oslodum"
Gil recorded "Oslodum" for the 2004 compilation album The Wired CD, an album composed of songs licensed under the Creative Commons. The song is heavily influenced by samba reggae, one of the many elements of Gil's style. The title is a play on the name Olodum, a major samba reggae cultural group based in Salvador, Bahia, Brazil.

Gil is a tenor, but he sings in the baritone or falsetto register, with lyrics and/or scat syllables. His lyrics are on subjects that range from philosophy to religion, folktales, and word play. Gil's musical style incorporates a broad range of influences. The first music he was exposed to included The Beatles and street performers in various metropolitan areas of Bahia. During his first years as a musician, Gil performed primarily in a blend of traditional Brazilian styles with two-step rhythms, such as baião and samba. He states that "My first phase was one of traditional forms. Nothing experimental at all. Caetano [Veloso] and I followed in the tradition of Luiz Gonzaga and Jackson do Pandeiro, combining samba with northeastern music." American music critic Robert Christgau said that along with Jorge Ben, Gil was "always ready to go further out on a beat than the other samba/bossa geniuses".

As one of the pioneers of tropicália, influences from genres such as rock and punk have been pervasive in his recordings, as they have been in those of other stars of the period, including Caetano Veloso and Tom Zé. Gil's interest in the blues-based music of rock pioneer Jimi Hendrix, in particular, has been described by Veloso as having "extremely important consequences for Brazilian music". Veloso also noted the influence of Brazilian guitarist and singer Jorge Ben on Gil's musical style, coupled with that of traditional music. After the height of tropicália in the 1960s, Gil became increasingly interested in black culture, particularly in the Jamaican musical genre of reggae. He described the genre as "a form of democratizing, internationalizing, speaking a new language, a Heideggerian form of passing along fundamental messages".

Visiting Lagos, Nigeria, in 1976 for the Festival of African Culture (FESTAC), Gil met fellow musicians Fela Kuti and Stevie Wonder. He became inspired by African music and later integrated some of the styles he had heard in Africa, such as juju and highlife, into his own recordings. One of the most famous of these African-influenced records was the 1977 album Refavela, which included "No Norte da Saudade" (To the North of Sadness), a song heavily influenced by reggae. When Gil returned to Brazil after the visit, he focused on Afro-Brazilian culture, becoming a member of the Carnaval afoxé group Filhos de Gandhi.

Conversely, his 1980s musical repertoire presented an increased development of dance trends, such as disco and soul, as well as the previous incorporation of rock and punk. However, Gil says that his 1994 album Acoustic was not such a new direction, as he had previously performed unplugged with Caetano Veloso. He describes the method of playing as easier than other types of performance, as the energy of acoustic playing is simple and influenced by its roots. Gil has been criticized for a conflicting involvement in both authentic Brazilian music and the worldwide musical arena. He has had to walk a fine line, simultaneously remaining true to traditional Bahian styles and engaging with commercial markets. Listeners in Bahia have been much more accepting of his blend of music styles, while those in southeast Brazil felt at odds with it.

== Discography ==
- 1967: Louvação
- 1968: Gilberto Gil (with Os Mutantes)
- 1968: Tropicália: ou Panis et Circencis (with Caetano Veloso, Gal Costa, Os Mutantes)
- 1969: Gilberto Gil (Cérebro Eletrônico)
- 1970: "Copacabana Mon Amour"
- 1971: Gilberto Gil (Nêga)
- 1972: Barra 69: Caetano e Gil Ao Vivo na Bahia
- 1972: Expresso 2222
- 1974: Gilberto Gil Ao Vivo
- 1975: "Gil e Jorge: Ogum Xangô" (with Jorge Ben)
- 1975: Refazenda
- 1976: Doces Bárbaros (with Gal Costa, Caetano Veloso and Maria Bethânia)
- 1977: Refavela
- 1978: Gilberto Gil Ao Vivo em Montreux
- 1978: Refestança (with Rita Lee)
- 1979: Nightingale
- 1979: Realce
- 1981: Brasil (João Gilberto album featuring Caetano Veloso, Gilberto Gil and Maria Bethânia)
- 1981: Luar (A Gente Precisa Ver o Luar)
- 1982: Um Banda Um
- 1983: Extra
- 1984: Quilombo (Trilha Sonora)
- 1984: Raça Humana
- 1985: Dia Dorim Noite Neon
- 1987: Gilberto Gil em Concerto
- 1987: Soy Loco por Ti America
- 1987: Trem Para As Estrelas (Trilha Sonora)
- 1988: Ao Vivo em Tóquio
- 1989: O Eterno Deus Mu Dança
- 1991: Parabolicamará
- 1994: Acoustic
- 1994: Tropicália 2 (with Caetano Veloso)
- 1995: Esoterico: Live in USA 1994
- 1995: Oriente: Live in Tokyo
- 1996: Em Concerto
- 1996: Luar
- 1997: Indigo Blue
- 1997: Quanta
- 1998: Ao Vivo em Tóquio
- 1998: O Sol de Oslo
- 1998: O Viramundo (Ao Vivo)
- 1998: Quanta Live
- 2000: Me, You, Them
- 2001: Gil & Milton (with Milton Nascimento)
- 2001: São João Vivo
- 2002: Kaya N'Gan Daya
- 2002: Z: 300 Anos de Zumbi
- 2004: Eletracústico
- 2005: Ao Vivo
- 2005: As Canções de Eu Tu Eles
- 2005: Soul of Brazil
- 2006: Gil Luminoso
- 2006: Rhythms of Bahia
- 2008: Banda Larga Cordel
- 2009: Bandadois
- 2010: Fé na Festa
- 2010: Fé na Festa ao vivo
- 2011: Gilberto + 10
- 2012: Especial Ivete Caetano Gilberto ao vivo
- 2013: Concerto de Cordas & Maquinas de Ritmo
- 2014: Gilbertos Samba
- 2015: Gilbertos Samba ao vivo
- 2016: Dois Amigos (with Caetano Veloso)
- 2017: Trinca de Ases (with Gal Costa and Nando Reis)
- 2018: OK OK OK
- 2022: Em Casa com os Gils

== Awards, nominations, and positions ==
Year	Work	Award	Result
1981	N/A	Anchieta Medal—São Paulo City Council	Won
1986	N/A	The Gold Dolphin—Government of the State of Rio de Janeiro	Won
1990	N/A	Ordre des Arts et des Lettres—Ministry of Culture of France	Won
1990	N/A	Commendator of the Order of Rio Branco	Won
1997	N/A	Ordre national du Mérite	Won
1999	Quanta Live	Grammy Award—Best World Music Album	Won
1999	N/A	Order of Cultural Merit—Ministry of Culture	Won
1999	N/A	UNESCO Artist for Peace—United Nations	Won
2001	Eu Tu Eles	Cinema Brazil Grand Prize—Best Music	Nominated
2001	As Canções De Eu, Tu, Eles	Latin Grammy Award—Brazilian Roots/Regional Album	Won
2001	N/A	Goodwill Ambassador—Food and Agriculture Organization	Won
2002	Viva São João!	Passista Trophy—Long Documentary – Best Score	Won
2002	São João Vivo	Latin Grammy Award—Best Brazilian Roots/Regional Album	Won
2003	N/A	Latin Recording Academy Person of the Year	Won
2005	Eletracústico	Grammy Award—Best Contemporary World Music Album	Won
2005	N/A	Polar Music Prize	Won
2005	N/A	Légion d'honneur	Won
2016	Gilbertos Samba Ao Vivo	Grammy Award for Best World Music Album	Nominated
2019	Ok Ok Ok	Latin Grammy Award for Best MPB Album	Won

== See also ==
- Vamos Fugir (pt)
- Sítio do Picapau Amarelo (pt)

Awards
Grammy Award
Preceded by Milton Nascimento	Grammy Award for Best World Music Album; 1999 for Quanta Live	Succeeded by Caetano Veloso
Latin Grammy Award
Preceded by Paulo Moura & Os Batutas	Latin Grammy Award for Best Portuguese Language Roots Album; 2001, 2002 for As Canções de Eu Tu Eles and São João Vivo	Succeeded by Dominguinhos
Preceded by Youssou N'Dour	Grammy Award for Best Contemporary World Music Album; 2006 for Eletracústico	Succeeded by The Klezmatics
Preceded by Ivan Lins and The Metropole Orchestra	Latin Grammy Award for Best MPB Album; 2010 for Especial Ivete, Gil e Caetano; Served alongside: Ivete Sangalo and Caetano Veloso	Succeeded by Maria Rita
First	Latin Grammy Award for Best Native Brazilian Roots Album; 2010 for Fé na Festa	Succeeded by Naná Vasconcelos
Multishow Brazilian Music Award
Preceded by Roberto Carlos	Multishow Brazilian Music Award for Best Singer; 2003	Succeeded by Caetano Veloso
Press Trophy
Preceded by Roberto Carlos	Press Trophy for Best Singer; 1974; Served alongside: Roberto Carlos	Succeeded by Chico Buarque
Political offices
Preceded by Francisco Weffort	Minister of Culture of Brazil; 2003–2008	Succeeded by Juca Ferreira
Academic offices
Preceded by Murilo Melo Filho	7th Academic of the 20th chair of the Brazilian Academy of Letters; 2022–present	Incumbent
