= Rogério Skylab discography =

Cataloging of published recordings by Brazilian singer Rogério Skylab

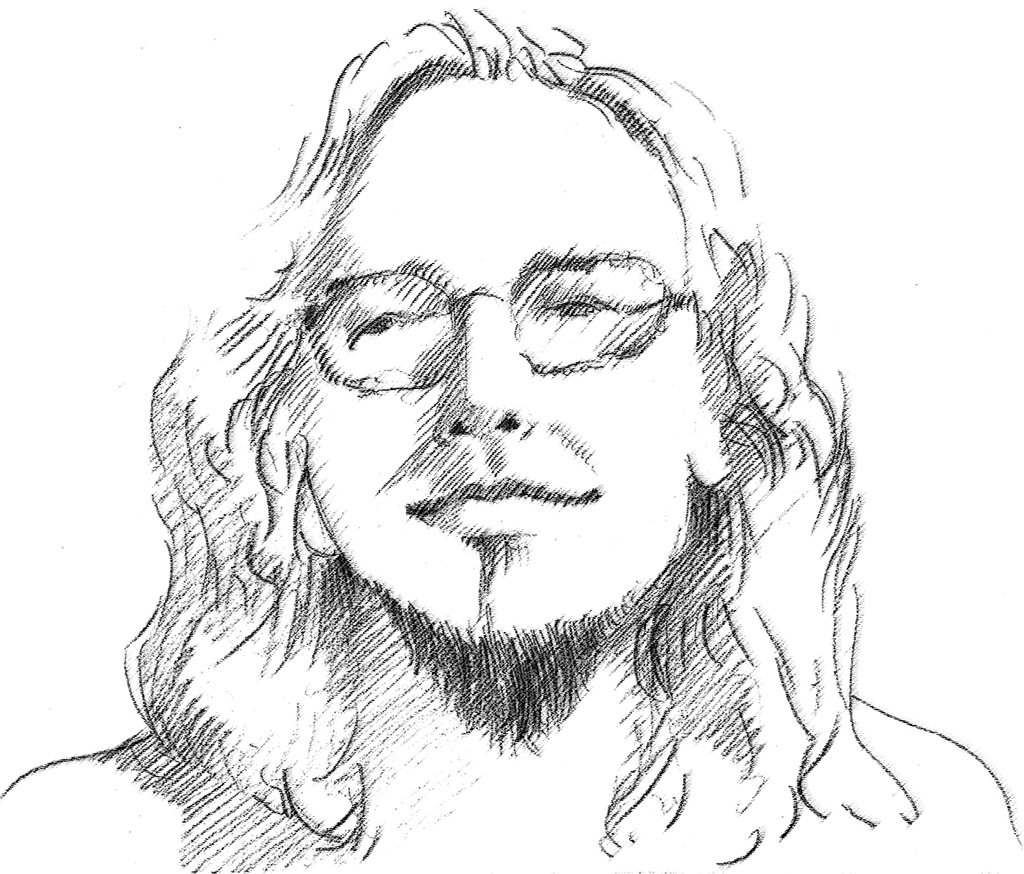
- A sketch of Skylab by Denis Mandarino
- Studio albums: 20
- EPs: 1
- Live albums: 5
- Compilation albums: 2
- Tribute albums: 1
- Singles: 32
- Video albums: 4
- Music videos: 12
- Collaborative albums: 11

The discography of Rogério Skylab, a Brazilian experimental singer, includes 31 studio albums (20 solo and 11 collaborations), one extended play, five live albums, four video albums, two compilation albums and 32 singles. His 1992 debut, Fora da Grei, was financed thanks to a money prize he won in a music festival the year prior, and since then, nearly all of his subsequent albums were self-released or came out through independent labels.

== Albums ==
=== Studio albums ===
Album	Year	Label	Format
Fora da Grei	1992	Self-released	Vinyl
Skylab	1999	Self-released	CD
Skylab III	2002	Self-released	CD
Skylab IV	2003	Self-released	CD
Skylab V	2004	OutraCoisa	CD
Skylab VI	2006	Self-released	CD
Skylab VII	2007	Self-released	CD
Skylab VIII	2008	Self-released	CD
Skylab X	2011	Self-released	CD
Abismo e Carnaval	2012	Self-released	CD
Melancolia e Carnaval	2014	Self-released	CD
Desterro e Carnaval	2015	Self-released	Digital streaming
O Rei do Cu	2018	Self-released	Digital streaming
Nas Portas do Cu	2019	Self-released	Digital streaming
Crítica da Faculdade do Cu	2019	Self-released	Digital streaming
Cosmos	2020	Self-released	Digital streaming
Os Cosmonautas (Note: Co-written with Lívio Tragtenberg)	2020	Self-released	Digital streaming
Caos e Cosmos, Vol. 1	2021	Self-released	Digital streaming
Caos e Cosmos, Vol. 2	2022	Self-released	Digital streaming
Caos e Cosmos, Vol. 3	2023	Self-released	Digital streaming
Trilogia do Fim, Vol. 1 (Note: Co-written with Cadu Tenório)	2024	Self-released	Digital streaming
Trilogia do Fim, Vol. 2 (Note: Co-written with Leandro Braga)	2024	Self-released	Digital streaming
Trilogia do Fim, Vol. 3 (Note: Co-written with Löis Lancaster)	2024	Self-released	Digital streaming
Trilogia da Putrefação, Vol. 1	2025	Self-released	Digital streaming
Trilogia da Putrefação, Vol. 2	2025	Self-released	Digital streaming
Trilogia da Putrefação, Vol. 3	2025	Self-released	Digital streaming
Encosto	2026 (upcoming)	Self-released	Digital streaming

=== Extended plays ===
Album	Year	Label	Format
Skylab EP	2017	Self-released	Digital streaming

=== Live/video albums ===
Album	Year	Label	Format
Skylab II	2000	Self-released	CD
Skylab IX	2009	Self-released	CD, DVD
Trilogia dos Carnavais: 25 Anos de Carreira ou de Lápide	2016	Coqueiro Verde Records	CD, DVD
Live	2022	Self-released	Digital streaming
Nas Encruzas	2026	Self-released	Digital streaming

=== Collaborative albums ===
Album	Year	Label	Format	Collaborator
Rogério Skylab & Orquestra Zé Felipe (Note: Album removed from circulation by Skylab)	2009	Self-released	CD, digital streaming	Zé Felipe
Skygirls	2009	Psicotropicodelia	CD, digital streaming	Leandra "Voz del Fuego" Lambert
Skylab & Tragtenberg, Vol. 1	2016	Self-released	Digital streaming	Lívio Tragtenberg
Skylab & Tragtenberg, Vol. 2	2016	Self-released	Digital streaming	Lívio Tragtenberg
Skylab & Tragtenberg, Vol. 3	2018	Self-released	Digital streaming	Lívio Tragtenberg

=== Compilation albums ===
Album	Year	Label	Format
The Best of Rogério Skylab	2010	Discobertas	CD
Mesa de Dissecação	2025	Self-released	Digital streaming

== Music videos ==
Title	Year	Director(s)
"Parafuso na Cabeça"	2003	Gustavo Caldas
"Amo Muito Tudo Isso"	2006	Luís Felipe Pepa
"Eu Tô Sempre Dopado"	2008	Amílcar Oliveira
"Eu Não Consigo Sair Daqui"	2011	Gustavo Caldas
"Hino Americano"	2014	Gustavo Bastos
"Menina Alienígena"	2015	Rodrigo Costalima and Zé Felipe
"Mictório"	2025	Arnaldo Belotto
"Você Vai Continuar Fazendo Música?"	2025	Arnaldo Belotto
"Skylab's Wake"	2025	Arnaldo Belotto
"Alguma Coisa Caiu"	2025	Arnaldo Belotto
"No Cemitério"	2025	Arnaldo Belotto
"Cadê Meu Pau?"	2026	Arnaldo Belotto

== Singles ==
Single	Year	Album	Label
"Matador de Passarinho"	1999	Skylab	Self-released
"Menina Alienígena" (feat. Zé Felipe)	2015	Non-album song (Note: Originally intended for a follow-up to Rogério Skylab & Orquestra Zé Felipe which never came through)	Self-released
"Bengala de Cego" (feat. Lívio Tragtenberg)	2015	Skylab & Tragtenberg, Vol. 1	Self-released
"O que te Perturba" (Live)	2016	Trilogia dos Carnavais: 25 Anos de Carreira ou de Lápide	Self-released
"Bocetinha de Cocô" (feat. Lívio Tragtenberg)	2017	Skylab & Tragtenberg, Vol. 3	Self-released
"À Sombra de um Horizonte"	2020	Cosmos	Self-released
"Cantos de Maldoror"	2021	Caos e Cosmos, Vol. 1	Self-released
"As Coisas que Ficaram por Dizer"	2021	Caos e Cosmos, Vol. 1	Self-released
"Será que Tem?"	2021	Caos e Cosmos, Vol. 1	Self-released
"Vampiro" (Live)	2021	Live	Self-released
"A Gente Vai Ficar Surdo" (Demo Version)	2022	Caos e Cosmos, Vol. 2	Self-released
"Juízo Final" (feat. Alexandre Kassin)	2022	Non-album song	Self-released
"Rua Barão de Mesquita"	2023	Caos e Cosmos, Vol. 3	Self-released
"Fátima Bernardes Experiência"	2023	Skylab V	Self-released
"A Máquina Fantástica"	2023	Crítica da Faculdade do Cu	Self-released
"Alameda Casa Branca"	2023	Caos e Cosmos, Vol. 3	Self-released
"Vala de Perus"	2023	Caos e Cosmos, Vol. 3	Self-released
"Minha Música" (feat. Cadu Tenório)	2023	Trilogia do Fim, Vol. 1	Self-released
"Skylab's Wake" (feat. Cadu Tenório)	2023	Trilogia do Fim, Vol. 1	Self-released
"Corpo sem Pé, Corpo sem Cabeça" (feat. Cadu Tenório)	2024	Trilogia do Fim, Vol. 1	Self-released
"Os Nicks" (feat. Cadu Tenório)	2024	Trilogia do Fim, Vol. 1	Self-released
"Perdição" (feat. Cadu Tenório)	2024	Trilogia do Fim, Vol. 1	Self-released
"Vamos Abrir" (feat. Cadu Tenório)	2024	Trilogia do Fim, Vol. 1	Self-released
"Rainha do Mar" (feat. Cadu Tenório)	2024	Trilogia do Fim, Vol. 1	Self-released
"Eu Vou te Dar"	2025	Trilogia da Putrefação, Vol. 1	Self-released
"Mictório"	2025	Skylab IV	Self-released
"Você Vai Continuar Fazendo Música?"	2025	Skylab V	Self-released
"Alguma Coisa Caiu"	2025	TBD	Self-released
"Todo Mundo Comendo Todo Mundo" (feat. Löis Lancaster)	2025	Trilogia da Putrefação, Vol. 3	Self-released
"Euvira"	2026	Skylab IV	Self-released
"O Meu Pau Fica Duro" (Live)	2026	Nas Encruzas	Self-released
"É Preciso Esquecer Como Você se Chama"	2026	Encosto	Self-released

== Other appearances ==
Song(s)	Year	Album	Comments
"Doente Porém Vivo" "São Abdul" "Calendário 1999" "Humilharal"	2000	Pesadelo na Discoteca	Album by Zumbi do Mato.
"Segunda-Feira" "É Tudo Falso"	2002	Tributo ao Inédito	Both later released on Skylab III.
"Revolution 9"	2008	Tributo ao Álbum Branco	Cover of a 1968 Beatles song.
"Três da Madrugada"	2016	A Música Contra o Golpe	Cover of a poem by Torquato Neto set to music by Carlos Pinto and sung by Gal Costa in 1973.
"Entreportas"	2020	Monument for Nothing	Album by Cadu Tenório; contributed with both vocals and lyrics.
"Ratamahatta"	2025	Non-album single	Cover by Panaceia of a 1996 Sepultura song; also featuring Korzus vocalist Marcello Pompeu.
