= The Best of Rogério Skylab =

Compilation album by Rogério Skylab
- Released: 2010
- Recorded: 1999–2008
- Genre: Experimental rock; art rock; noise rock; samba rock; MPB
- Label: Discobertas
- Producer: Rogério Skylab, Robertinho do Recife

Rogério Skylab chronology
Skygirls (2009)	The Best of Rogério Skylab (2010)	Skylab X (2011)

The Best of Rogério Skylab is a compilation album by the Brazilian musician Rogério Skylab. It was released in 2010 through independent label Discobertas, and compiled by journalist Marcelo Fróes under Skylab's direct assistance. It contains 20 of Skylab's greatest hits, ranging from Skylab (1999) to Skylab VIII (2008).

== Track listing ==
All tracks produced by Rogério Skylab, except for tracks 1–8 by Robertinho do Recife.

No.	Title	Original release	Length
1.	"Matador de Passarinho"	Skylab (1999)	2:33
2.	"Motosserra"	Skylab (1999)	3:29
3.	"Urubu"	Skylab (1999)	4:37
4.	"Matadouro de Almas"	Skylab (1999)	3:51
5.	"Derrame"	Skylab (1999)	2:46
6.	"No Cemitério"	Skylab (1999)	3:05
7.	"Funérea"	Skylab (1999)	3:20
8.	"Carne Humana"	Skylab (1999)	3:30
9.	"Metrô"	Skylab II (2000)	3:09
10.	"Convento das Carmelitas"	Skylab II (2000)	3:33
11.	"Sensações/Fora da Grei"	Skylab II (2000)	4:47
12.	"Acorda, Siva Maria"	Skylab III (2002)	2:23
13.	"Cântico dos Cânticos"	Skylab III (2002)	5:09
14.	"Bunda Suja"	Skylab IV (2003)	3:12
15.	"Eu Fico Nervoso"	Skylab V (2004)	3:44
16.	"Você É Feia"	Skylab V (2004)	4:46
17.	"Eu Tô Pensando"	Skylab V (2004)	4:02
18.	"Cadê Meu Pau?"	Skylab VI (2006)	4:12
19.	"O Primeiro Tapa É Meu"	Skylab VII (2007)	2:27
20.	"Eu Tô Sempre Dopado"	Skylab VIII (2008)	4:07
