= Le Bateau ivre =

1871 poem by Arthur Rimbaud

LibriVox reading in French

"Le Bateau ivre" ("The Drunken Boat") is a Symbolist poem written in the summer of 1871 by French poet Arthur Rimbaud, then aged sixteen. The poem, one-hundred lines long, with four alexandrines per each of its twenty-five quatrains, describes the drifting and sinking of a boat lost at sea in a fragmented first-person narrative saturated with vivid imagery and symbolism. It is unanimously considered to be one of the paragons of the genre, and a significant influence on modern poetry.

== Background ==
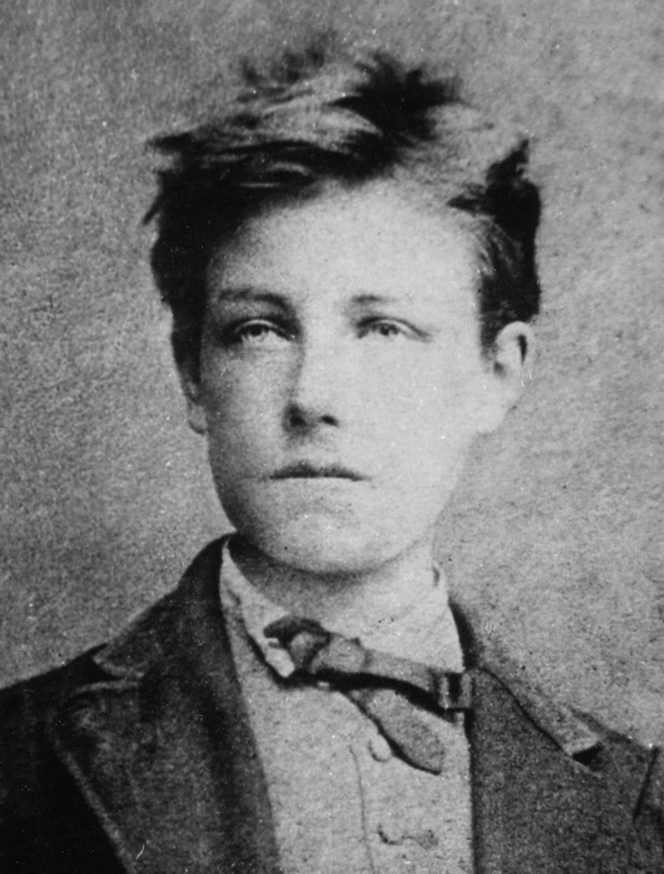
Rimbaud at the age of seventeen, by Étienne Carjat; c. 1872

Rimbaud, then aged 16, wrote the poem in the summer of 1871 at his childhood home in Charleville in Northern France. Rimbaud included the poem in a letter he sent to Paul Verlaine in September 1871 to introduce himself to Verlaine. Shortly afterwards, he joined Verlaine in Paris and became his lover. Rimbaud and Verlaine had a stormy affair. In Brussels in July 1873, in a drunken, jealous rage, Verlaine fired two shots with a pistol at Rimbaud, wounding his left wrist, though not seriously injuring the poet.

Rimbaud was inspired to write the poem after reading Charles Baudelaire's volume of French poetry Les Fleurs du mal and Jules Verne's 1870 novel Twenty Thousand Leagues Under the Seas, which had recently been published in book form, and which is known to have been the source of many of the poem's allusions and images. Another Verne novel, The Adventures of Captain Hatteras, was likely an additional source of inspiration.

== Summary ==
The poem is arranged in a series of 25 alexandrine quatrains with an a/b/a/b rhyme-scheme. It is woven around the delirious visions of the eponymous boat, swamped and lost at sea. It was considered revolutionary in its use of imagery and symbolism. One of the longest and perhaps best poems in Rimbaud's œuvre, it opens with the following quatrain:

Comme je descendais des Fleuves impassibles,
Je ne me sentis plus guidé par les haleurs :
Des Peaux-Rouges criards les avaient pris pour cibles
Les ayant cloués nus aux poteaux de couleurs.

Translation:

As I was going down impassive Rivers,
I no longer felt myself guided by haulers:
Yelping redskins had taken them as targets
And had nailed them naked to colored stakes.

— Translated by Wallace Fowlie

Rimbaud biographer Enid Starkie describes the poem as an anthology of memorable images and lines. The voice is that of the drunken boat itself. The boat tells of becoming filled with water, thus "drunk". Sinking through the sea, the boat describes a journey of varied experience that includes sights of the purest and most transcendent (l'éveil jaune et bleu des phosphores chanteurs, "the yellow-blue alarum of phosphors singing") and at the same time of the most repellent (nasses / Où pourrit dans les joncs tout un Léviathan, "nets where a whole Leviathan was rotting"). The marriage of exaltation and debasement, the synesthesia, and the mounting astonishment make this hundred-line poem the fulfillment of Rimbaud's youthful poetic theory that the poet becomes a seer, a vatic being, through the disordering of the senses. To these attractions are added alexandrines of immediate aural appeal: Fermentent les rousseurs amères de l'amour! ("fermenting the bitter blushes of love").

The boat's (and reader's) mounting astonishment reaches its high point in lines 87–88: Est-ce en ces nuits sans fonds que tu dors et t'exiles / Million d'oiseaux d'or, ô future Vigueur? ("Is it in these bottomless nights that you sleep and exile yourself / a million golden birds, o future Strength?") Afterwards, the vision is lost and the spell breaks. The speaker, still a boat, wishes for death (Ô que ma quille éclate! Ô que j'aille à la mer!, "O that my keel would break! O that I would go to the sea!"). The grandiose aspirations have deceived, leaving exhaustion and the sense of imprisonment.

Le Bateau ivre remains one of the gems of French poetry and of Rimbaud's poetic output. Vladimir Nabokov translated it to Russian in 1928. French poet-composer Léo Ferré set it to music and sang it in the album Ludwig-L'Imaginaire-Le Bateau ivre (1982).

== In other media ==
- French singer-songwriter Léo Ferré set the poem into music and recorded the song in his 1982 triple LP Ludwig-L'imaginaire-Le Bateau ivre. He used two first quatrains as a chorus repeated seven times, leading to a thirteen-minute-long song.
- The American rock band Drunken Boat was named after the poem.
- The Pogues recorded a song called "Drunken Boat" for their 1993 album Waiting for Herb. It has similar themes to the poem, and its chorus borrows from the poem's penultimate stanza.
- Cordwainer Smith wrote a science fiction story called "Drunkboat", whose protagonist is named Artyr Rambo, first published in Amazing Stories, August 1963.
- Donna Tartt quotes the lines "Mais, vrai, j'ai trop pleuré ! Les Aubes sont navrantes" from Le Bateau ivre in her 1992 novel The Secret History.
- Brazilian musician Rogério Skylab has a song inspired by, and titled after, the poem in his 2020 album Os Cosmonautas.
- In Murder by Numbers a screenshot of the opening page is shown at time stamp 36:06.

== Gallery ==
Le Bateau ivre as a wall poem in Paris

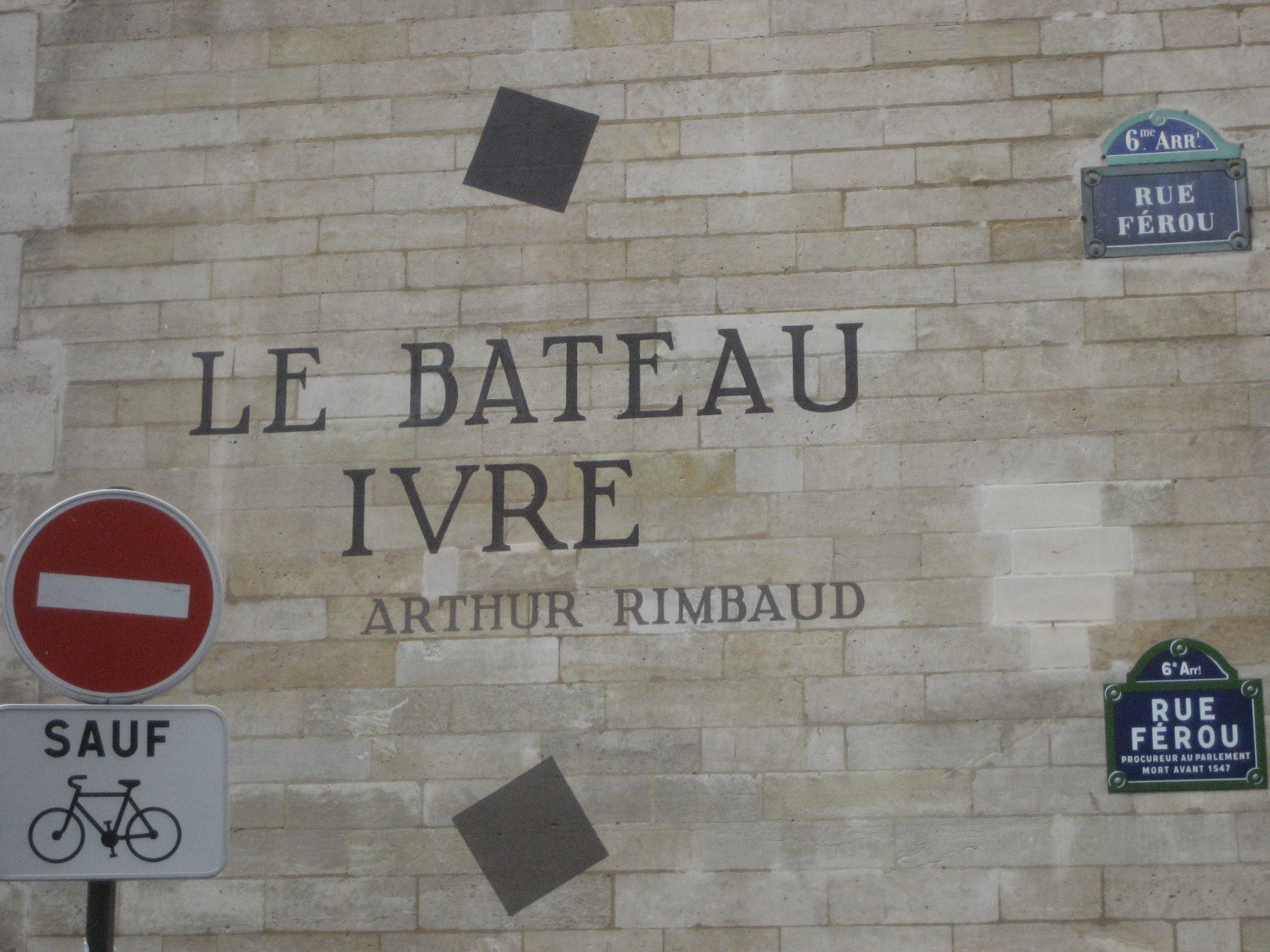

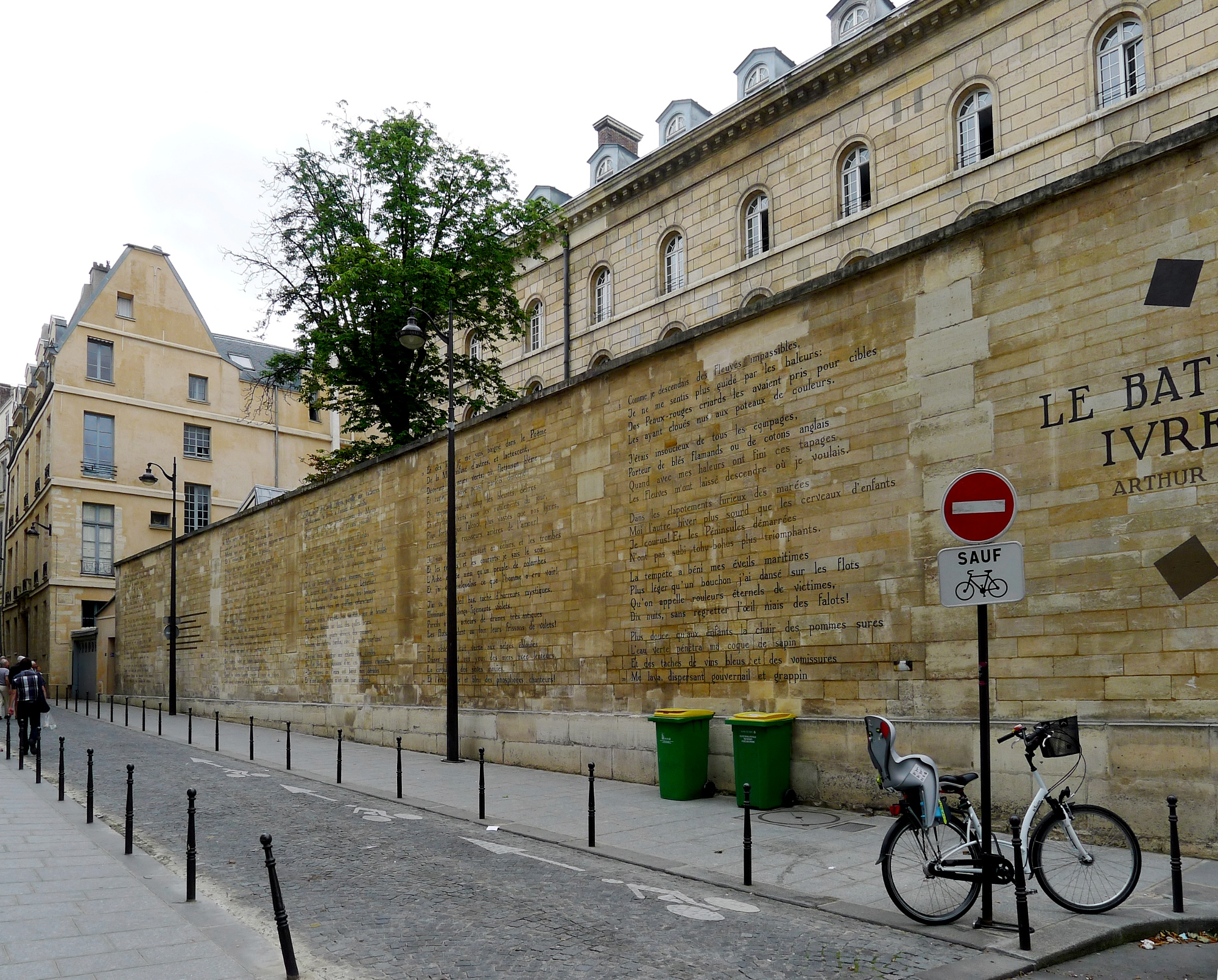

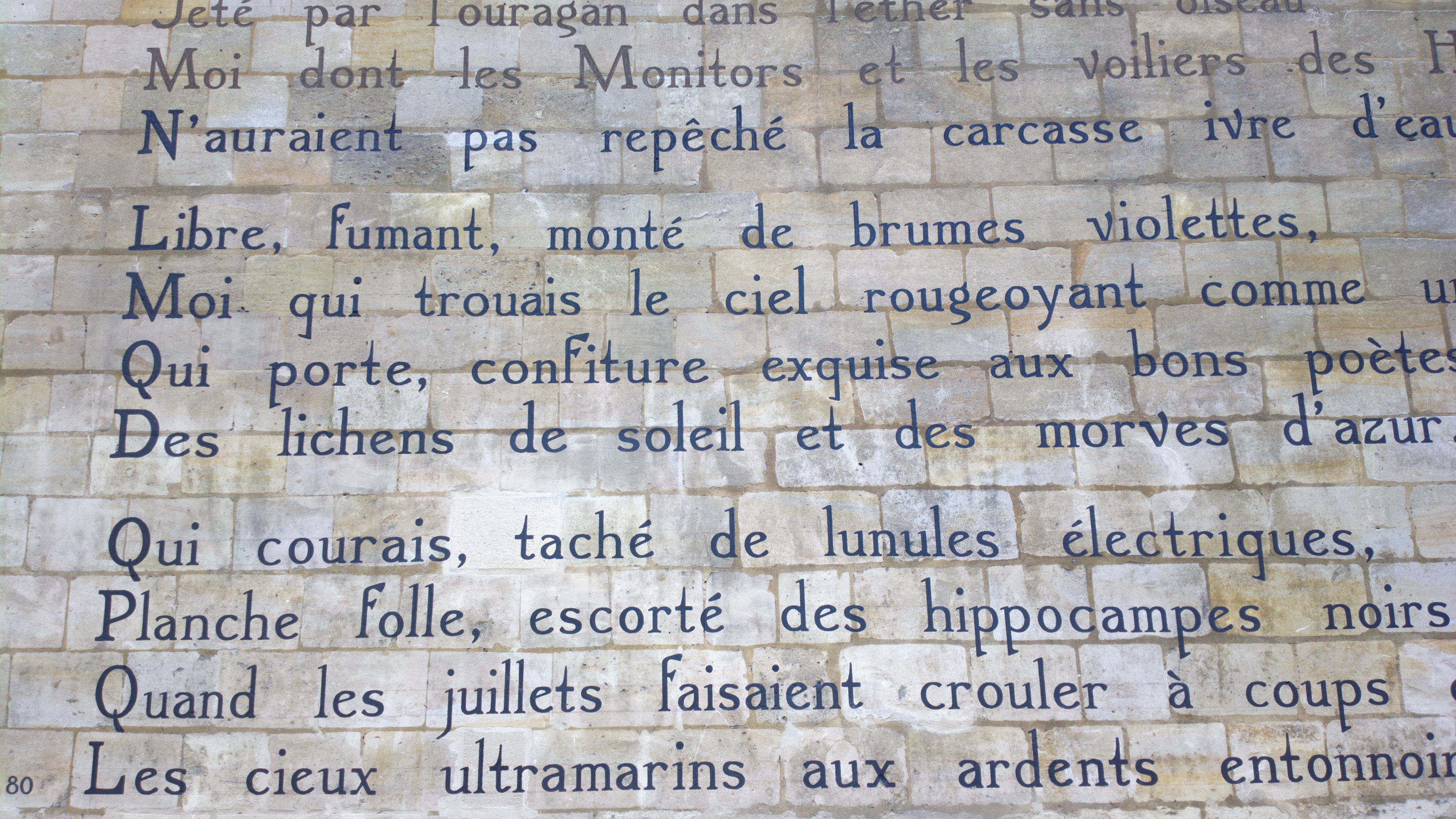

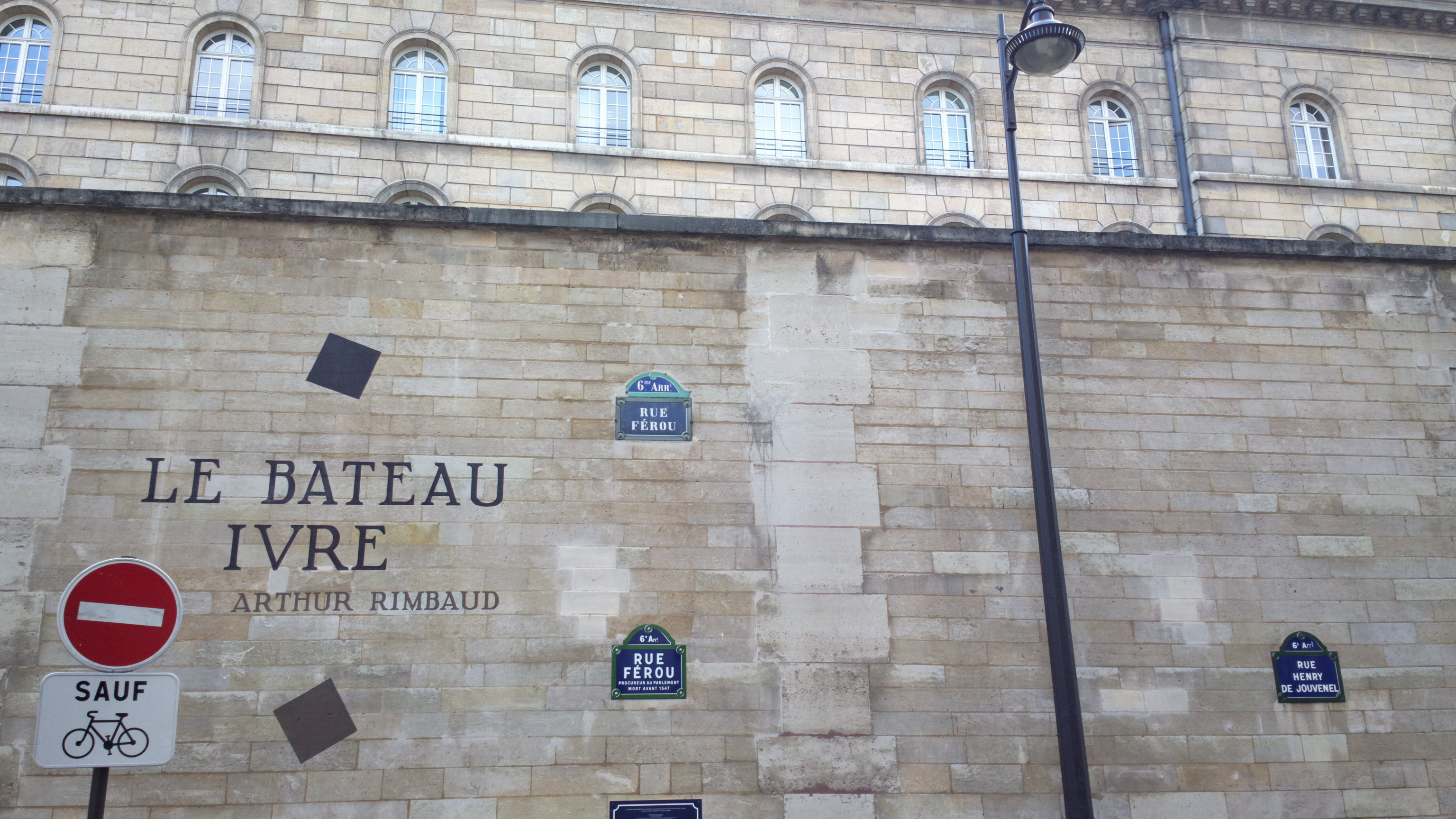

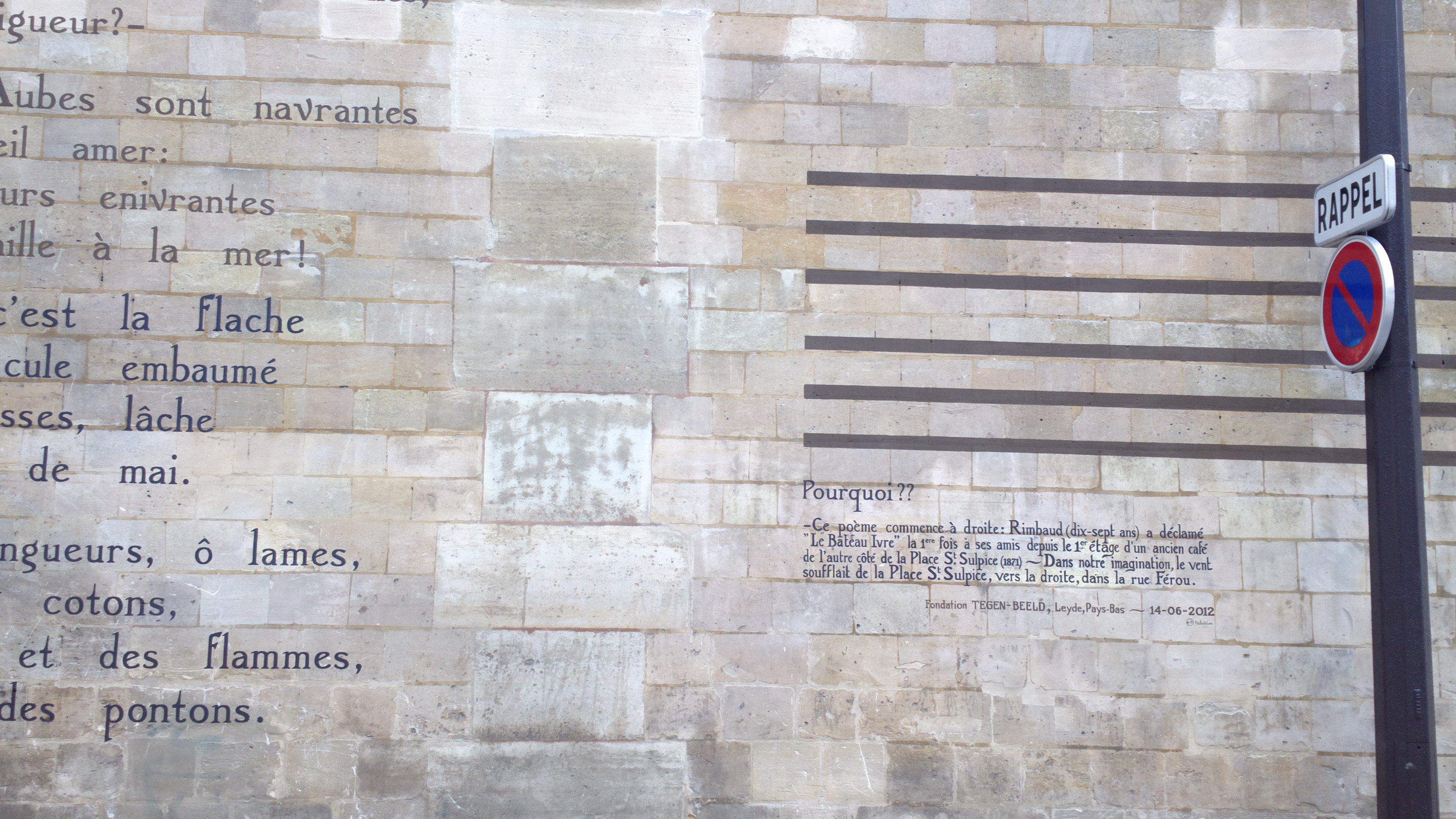

== See also ==
- Ship of fools, an allegory in western art depicting a ship of madmen, who sail oblivious of their destination
