= Crítica da Faculdade do Cu =

Studio album by Rogério Skylab
- Released: December 20, 2019
- Recorded: 2019
- Studio: Estúdio Hi-Eight
- Genre: Experimental rock; art rock; MPB
- Length: 1:13:35
- Label: Self-released
- Producer: Rogério Skylab

Rogério Skylab chronology
Nas Portas do Cu (2019)	Crítica da Faculdade do Cu (2019)	Cosmos (2020)

Singles from Crítica da Faculdade do Cu
- 1. "A Máquina Fantástica" Released: April 7, 2023

Crítica da Faculdade do Cu (Portuguese for "Critique of the Power of the Ass") is the fifteenth studio album by the Brazilian musician Rogério Skylab, the final installment of the "Trilogia do Cu" ("Trilogy of the Ass"). Totaling 17 tracks, it is the longest album of the trilogy, and was self-described by Skylab as "one of [his] most complex and weirdest works". Released on December 20, 2019, it is available for free download on the musician's official website and for streaming in platforms such as Spotify and the iTunes Store. Its title is a pun on Immanuel Kant's 1790 philosophical treatise Critique of the Power of Judgment.

The album and the trilogy it is part of as a whole were originally announced by Skylab on his official Facebook page on March 7, 2018. In an August 2019 interview, the musician stated that the album was in post-production stage and originally slated for an early January 2020 release. As was the case of its predecessor, Lívio Tragtenberg provided the pre-mixing and samples for the album, in his fifth collaboration overall with Skylab.

Guest musicians include Vovô Bebê (guitar and backing vocals in "Homo Sacer") and comedic funk carioca singer MC Gorila (vocals and co-author of "Cabecinha"). "A Marchinha Psicótica de Dr. Soup" is a cover of the song by Jupiter Apple, and his third cover by Skylab following "Na Casa de Mamãe" (off Skygirls) and "Eu e Minha Ex" (off Trilogia dos Carnavais: 25 Anos de Carreira ou de Lápide). "Tem Cigarro Aí?" was re-recorded from Skylab's 2009 collaborative album with Zumbi do Mato bassist Zé Felipe, Rogério Skylab & Orquestra Zé Felipe. "Boceta Bradesco" had its title famously inspired by a tweet made by YouTuber Pirula. "A Máquina Fantástica" was issued as a single on April 7, 2023.

"Caetano de Dedé" references in its title musician Caetano Veloso and his first wife, Andréa "Dedé" Gadelha.

== Track listing ==
All tracks are written by Rogério Skylab, except for "A Marchinha Psicótica de Dr. Soup" by Jupiter Apple; "Tem Cigarro Aí?" by Skylab and Zé Felipe; and "Cabecinha" by Skylab and MC Gorila

No.	Title	English title	Length
1.	"Crítica da Faculdade do Cu"	Critique of the Power of the Ass	5:04
2.	"A Marchinha Psicótica de Dr. Soup" (Jupiter Apple cover)	Dr. Soup's Psychotic Marchinha	6:51
3.	"Fundo do Mar"	Bottom of the Sea	6:17
4.	"Homo Sacer" (feat. Vovô Bebê)		2:29
5.	"Tem Cigarro Aí?"	Got a Cigarette Over There?	8:22
6.	"A Máquina Fantástica"	The Fantastic Machine	3:22
7.	"Caetano de Dedé"	Dedé's Caetano	5:05
8.	"Quando Nos Encontramos"	When We Met	2:26
9.	"Cabecinha" (feat. MC Gorila)	Little Head	2:37
10.	"Beijar É Mais Importante que Foder"	Kissing's More Important Than Fucking	4:11
11.	"Sem Fim"	Endlessly	2:09
12.	"Boceta Bradesco"	Bradesco Pussy	6:37
13.	"Minha Escola de Samba"	My Samba School	2:16
14.	"O Aleijado"	The Cripple	3:53
15.	"Hieróglifos"	Hieroglyphs	4:47
16.	"Iemanjá"		3:01
17.	"Segredos"	Secrets	3:59

== Personnel ==
- Rogério Skylab – vocals, backing vocals (track 9), production
- Vovô Bebê – classical guitar, backing vocals (track 4)
- MC Gorila – lead vocals (track 9)
- Thiago Martins – electric guitar
- Yves Aworet – bass guitar
- Alex Curi – drums
- Lívio Tragtenberg – pre-mixing, sampling
- Vânius Marques – mixing, mastering
- Solange Venturi – photography
- Carlos Mancuso – cover art
