= Skylab X =

Studio album by Rogério Skylab
- Released: 2011
- Recorded: September 2008
- Studio: Estúdio Cia. dos Técnicos
- Genre: Experimental rock; art rock; noise rock; samba rock; MPB
- Length: 1:13:34
- Label: Self-released
- Producer: Rogério Skylab

Rogério Skylab chronology
The Best of Rogério Skylab (2010)	Skylab X (2011)	Abismo e Carnaval (2012)

Professional ratings
Review scores
Source	Rating
Miojo Indie	7/10 link
Embrulhador.com	(favorable) link

Skylab X is the ninth studio album by the Brazilian musician Rogério Skylab, the final installment of his series of ten eponymous, numbered albums. It was self-released in 2011, but originally recorded in 2008. A music video was made for the track "Eu Não Consigo Sair Daqui".

The album can be downloaded for free on Skylab's official website.

== Critical reception ==
Writing for blog Miojo Indie, Fernanda Blammer gave the album a positive review, rating it with a 7 out of 10. She praised Skylab X as being "peculiar and eccentric" and "atmospheric", but criticized it for being "less anarchic and aggressive, and more 'well-behaved' than Skylab's previous releases, particularly if compared to the classics Skylab III and Skylab VI".

Ed Félix of Embrulhador.com featured Skylab X in 97th place in its list of the Top 100 Brazilian Albums of 2011.

== Track listing ==
All tracks are written by Rogério Skylab

No.	Title	English title	Length
1.	"Analfabeto"	Illiterate	5:59
2.	"Se Tá Tudo por um Triz"	If Everything Is by a Whisker	7:08
3.	"Aonde Eu Vivo, Aonde Eu Moro"	Where I Live, Where I Reside	5:02
4.	"Eu Não Consigo Sair Daqui"	I Can't Get Out of Here	4:10
5.	"Bandeira Negra"	Black Flag	5:07
6.	"Zumbi É Gay"	Zumbi Is Gay	4:04
7.	"Cueca"	Underpants	8:11
8.	"Avesso"	Inside Out	2:58
9.	"Eu Roubei a Gravata?"	Did I Steal the Tie?	4:21
10.	"No Sertão da Minha Vida"	In the Sertão of My Life	3:41
11.	"O Pensamento Voa"	The Thought Flies	3:35
12.	"O Trem"	The Train	3:03
13.	"O Corvo"	The Raven	7:01
14.	"Quem Responde É o Diabo"	The Devil Answers	5:03
15.	"Rota em Colisão"	Route in Collision	4:05

== Personnel ==
- Rogério Skylab – vocals, production
- Thiago Amorim – electric guitar
- Alexandre Guichard – classical guitar
- Pedro Dantas – bass guitar
- Bruno Coelho – drums
- Luiz Antônio Porto – piano (tracks 10 and 12)
- Vânius Marques – mixing, mastering
- Carlos Mancuso – cover art
- Solange Venturi – photography
