= Marcelo Jeneci =

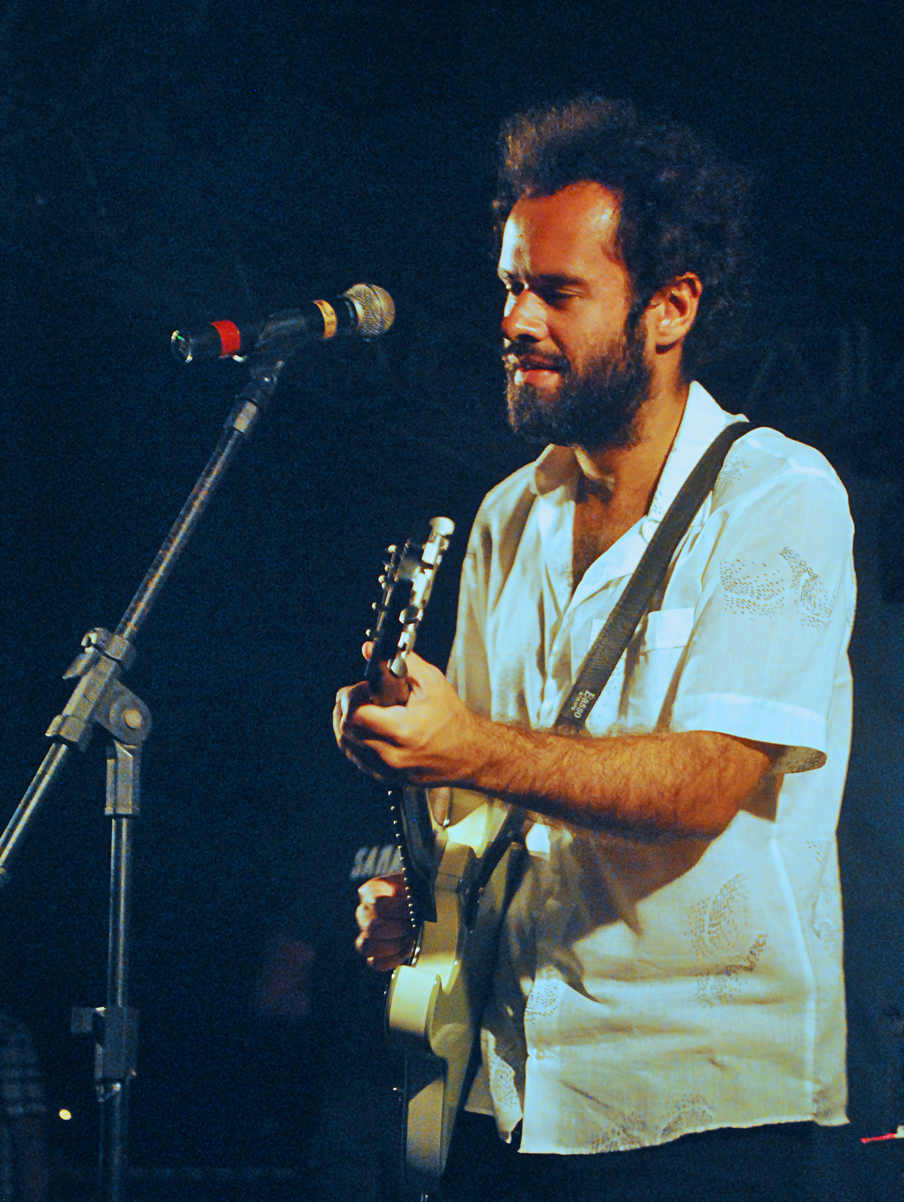
- Jeneci in 2013
- Born: April 7, 1982 (age 44); São Paulo, São Paulo, Brazil
- Occupations: Singer-songwriter, guitarist, accordionist
- Years active: 2000–present
- Awards: APCA Award (2014)
- Musical career
- Genres: MPB
- Instruments: Vocals, guitar, accordion
- Label: SLAP
- Website: marcelojeneci.com.br

Marcelo Jeneci (born April 7, 1982), also known mononymously as Jeneci, is a Brazilian singer-songwriter, guitarist and accordionist. He was nominated for the Latin Grammy Award for Best MPB Album in 2014 for De Graça. In the same year, he received the APCA Award for "Best Composer".

== Biography ==
Jeneci was born in the Guaianases district of São Paulo on April 7, 1982. He had his first music lessons with his father, who worked as a repairman for musical instruments, and began his career in 2000 as an accordionist for singer Chico César's live band. He was also a backing musician for Arnaldo Antunes and Erasmo Carlos. His first success as a composer came in 2008 with "Amado", a collaboration with Vanessa da Mata which was included in the soundtrack of Rede Globo's telenovela A Favorita.

He co-wrote songs alongside Arnaldo Antunes, Zé Miguel Wisnik and Luiz Tatit, and was also a collaborator for British duo Da Lata. His debut album, Feito pra Acabar, came out in 2010 and had a positive reception. His songs continued to be featured in Rede Globo's telenovelas, such as "Quarto de Dormir" (in Lado a Lado, 2012), Feito pra Acabar (in Flor do Caribe, 2013), Um de Nós (in Em Família, 2014) and "Veja (Margarida)", a Vital Farias cover (in Velho Chico, 2016). His second album, De Graça, came out in 2013.

In 2015 he recorded "Dia a Dia, Lado a Lado" alongside Tulipa Ruiz, afterwards embarking with her on a nationwide tour.

== References in popular culture ==
Jeneci is alluded in Rogério Skylab's song "Jeneci, Kassin, Tulipa", off his 2018 album O Rei do Cu, alongside Alexandre Kassin and Tulipa Ruiz.

== Discography ==
=== Studio albums ===
Year	Album
2010	Feito pra Acabar: Label: SLAP; Format: CD
2013	De Graça: Label: SLAP; Format: CD
2019	Guaia: Label: SLAP
