= Trilogia dos Carnavais: 25 Anos de Carreira ou de Lápide =

Live album by Rogério Skylab
- Released: August 30, 2016
- Recorded: 2016
- Venue: Estúdio 24P, Rio de Janeiro, Brazil
- Genre: Samba; bossa nova; MPB
- Length: 58:12
- Label: Coqueiro Verde Records
- Producer: Rogério Skylab

Rogério Skylab chronology
Skylab & Tragtenberg, Vol. 1 (2016)	Trilogia dos Carnavais: 25 Anos de Carreira ou de Lápide (2016)	Skylab & Tragtenberg, Vol. 2 (2016)

Singles from Trilogia dos Carnavais: 25 Anos de Carreira ou de Lápide
- 1. "O que te Perturba" Released: April 24, 2016

Trilogia dos Carnavais: 25 Anos de Carreira ou de Lápide (Portuguese for "Trilogy of the Carnivals: 25 Years of Career or of Tombstone") is a live album by the Brazilian musician Rogério Skylab. It was released on August 30, 2016 through independent label Coqueiro Verde Records, and recorded during a show at the Estúdio 24P in Rio de Janeiro, in which Skylab celebrated 25 years of professional musical career and promoted his Trilogia dos Carnavais series of albums: Abismo e Carnaval (2012), Melancolia e Carnaval (2014) and Desterro e Carnaval (2015). A DVD containing footage of the performance and additional tracks was simultaneously released. It is Skylab's first of two releases not to be available for free download on his official website, the second being the 2017 EP Skylab. "O que te Perturba" was released as a teaser single on Skylab's YouTube channel on April 24, 2016.

Arrigo Barnabé, Fausto Fawcett and Tavinho Paes were guest musicians on the album; they all previously appeared on Desterro e Carnaval. Paes, however, only appears in the DVD, reciting his poem "Perdas e Ganhos".

== Track listing ==
=== CD ===
All tracks are written by Rogério Skylab, except for "A Árvore" by Skylab and Fausto Fawcett and "Eu e Minha Ex" by Jupiter Apple.

No.	Title	English title	Length
1.	"Abismo e Carnaval"	Abyss and Carnival	4:27
2.	"Baleia de Aquário"	Aquarium Whale	4:32
3.	"Empadinha de Camarão"	Shrimp Pot Pie	3:29
4.	"Branco do Brasil"	Brazilian White	3:56
5.	"Lívia" (feat. Arrigo Barnabé)		3:37
6.	"Hino Americano"	American Anthem	3:15
7.	"Aqui Todo Mundo É Preto"	Everyone's Black Here	4:31
8.	"Quando Voltava das Festas"	When I Came Back from the Parties	3:46
9.	"O que te Perturba"	What Disturbs You	3:13
10.	"Atravesso os Dias"	I Cross the Days	3:44
11.	"Tarde de Sol no Rio de Janeiro"	Sunny Afternoon in Rio de Janeiro	3:16
12.	"Um Acorde Imperfeito"	An Imperfect Chord	3:11
13.	"A Árvore" (feat. Fausto Fawcett)	The Tree	5:54
14.	"Eu e Minha Ex" (Jupiter Apple cover)	My Ex and Me	7:14

=== DVD ===
All tracks written by Rogério Skylab, except for "Cogito" by Torquato Neto; "A Árvore" by Skylab and Fausto Fawcett; "Perdas e Ganhos" by Tavinho Paes; and "Eu e Minha Ex" by Jupiter Apple.

1. "Abismo e Carnaval"
2. "Baleia de Aquário"
3. "Empadinha de Camarão"
4. "Branco do Brasil"
5. "Lívia" (feat. Arrigo Barnabé)
6. "Hino Americano"
7. "Aqui Todo Mundo É Preto"
8. "Quando Voltava das Festas"
9. "O que te Perturba"
10. "Se Fosse Impossível a Canção"
11. "Atravesso os Dias"
12. "Tarde de Sol no Rio de Janeiro"
13. "Cogito"
14. "Sem Saída"
15. "Um Acorde Imperfeito"
16. "Sem Você"
17. "Só"
18. "Equivocidade"
19. "A Árvore" (feat. Fausto Fawcett)
20. "Perdas e Ganhos" (feat. Tavinho Paes)
21. "Eu e Minha Ex" (Jupiter Apple cover)
22. "Vamos Esquecer"

== Personnel ==
- Rogério Skylab – vocals, production
- Thiago Martins – electric guitar
- Alexandre Guichard – classical guitar
- Yves Aworet – bass guitar
- Bruno Coelho – drums
- Arrigo Barnabé – additional vocals in "Lívia"
- Fausto Fawcett – additional vocals in "A Árvore"
- Tavinho Paes – vocals in "Perdas e Ganhos"
- Vânius Marques – mixing, mastering
- Juliana Torres – photography, cover art
- Bernardo Mendonça – director, director of photography
