= Skylab & Tragtenberg, Vol. 1 =

Studio album by Rogério Skylab and Lívio Tragtenberg
- Released: April 16, 2016
- Genre: Electronica; MPB; experimental music; minimal music
- Length: 46:50
- Label: Self-released
- Producer: Rogério Skylab

Rogério Skylab chronology
Desterro e Carnaval (2015)	Skylab & Tragtenberg, Vol. 1 (2016)	Trilogia dos Carnavais: 25 Anos de Carreira ou de Lápide (2016)

Singles from Skylab & Tragtenberg, Vol. 1
- 1. "Bengala de Cego" Released: October 17, 2015

Skylab & Tragtenberg, Vol. 1 is a collaborative album between Brazilian musicians Rogério Skylab and Lívio Tragtenberg. The first installment of a trilogy, it was self-released on April 16, 2016, and is available for digital download/streaming on Deezer, the iTunes Store and Spotify, as well as on Skylab's official website. "Bengala de Cego" was released as a teaser single on Skylab's official YouTube channel on October 17, 2015.

As its title implies, the track "Hino do Fluminense Football Club" is a cover of the anthem of the eponymous soccer team; Skylab is a die-hard fan of it. "Hino Francês" is sung to the tune of the national anthem of France, "La Marseillaise".

The album also counts with a guest appearance by Romulo Fróes, who previously collaborated with Skylab on Melancolia e Carnaval. Its artwork (as well as of its successors') is a modified version of Frank Zappa's 1985 album Frank Zappa Meets the Mothers of Prevention's cover art.

== Track listing ==
All lyrics are written by Rogério Skylab, except for "Um Baê Obá", "Juazeiro do Brasil" and "Muito Pouco" by Skylab and Lívio Tragtenberg, and "Hino do Fluminense Football Club" by Lamartine Babo; all music is composed by Lívio Tragtenberg, except for "O Gozo" by Tragtenberg and Romulo Fróes

No.	Title	English title	Length
1.	"Um Baê Obá"		3:49
2.	"Bengala de Cego"	Blind Man's Cane	4:06
3.	"As Mesas de Bar"	Bar Tables	3:30
4.	"Último Trem"	Last Train	4:48
5.	"Um Suspiro" (instrumental)	A Sigh	4:26
6.	"Juazeiro do Brasil"	Juazeiro of Brazil	3:04
7.	"Hino do Fluminense Football Club"	Anthem of Fluminense Football Club	4:59
8.	"A Máscara"	The Mask	3:42
9.	"Eu Gosto de Você"	I Like You	4:24
10.	"Muito Pouco"	Too Little	3:33
11.	"Hino Francês"	French Anthem	2:38
12.	"O Gozo" (feat. Romulo Fróes)	The Enjoyment	3:46

== Personnel ==
- Rogério Skylab – vocals, production
- Lívio Tragtenberg – bass clarinet, sax, keyboards, mixing, arrangements
- Alexandre Guichard – classical guitar (tracks 4 and 9)
- Thiago Martins – classical guitar (tracks 2, 7 and 8)
- Romulo Fróes – classical guitar, vocals (track 12)
- Daniel Nakamura, Daniel Pinton – mastering
- Carlos Mancuso – cover art
