= Cosmos (Rogério Skylab album) =

Studio album by Rogério Skylab
- Released: October 2, 2020
- Recorded: 2019
- Studio: Estúdio Lontra
- Genre: Samba; bossa nova; MPB
- Length: 57:07
- Label: Self-released
- Producer: Rogério Skylab

Rogério Skylab chronology
Crítica da Faculdade do Cu (2019)	Cosmos (2020)	Os Cosmonautas (2020)

Singles from Cosmos
- 1. "À Sombra de um Horizonte" Released: March 19, 2020

Cosmos is the sixteenth studio album by the Brazilian musician Rogério Skylab. The first part of a "trilogy of five" entitled the "Trilogia do Cosmos", (Note: The "Trilogia do Cosmos" comprises Cosmos (2020), Os Cosmonautas (2020) and the "trilogy within a trilogy" Caos e Cosmos (2021–23), which is meant to be counted as a single release) it was released on October 2, 2020 and is available for free download on the musician's official website and for streaming.

Skylab originally announced the trilogy on his official Facebook page on August 19, 2020, claiming that its first installment would be released "in the next month or so"; four months prior, on March 19, the single "À Sombra de um Horizonte" came out as a teaser. In a later Facebook post, he elaborated that the trilogy was conceived as "an homage to three of the greatest Brazilian composers: Moacir Santos, Eumir Deodato and Hermeto Pascoal"; thus being, it follows a minimalistic sonority "based around piano, acoustic bass and drums" inspired by samba, bossa nova and MPB, and heavily reminiscent of his 2012–15 Trilogia dos Carnavais.

"Marcha Fúnebre" was re-recorded from Skylab's 2009 collaborative album with Zumbi do Mato bassist Zé Felipe, Rogério Skylab & Orquestra Zé Felipe; his second re-recording from such album following "Tem Cigarro Aí?" on his previous output Crítica da Faculdade do Cu. "O Corpo Real da Paolla" was inspired by an article regarding actress Paolla Oliveira.

== Critical reception ==
Writing for webzine Acrobata, Aristides Oliveira gave Cosmos a very favorable review, calling it a "great album" and praising Skylab's "musical maturation"; nevertheless, he stated that "those who are used to Skylab's rock phase might not like it".

== Track listing ==
All tracks are written by Rogério Skylab, except for "Marcha Fúnebre" by Skylab and Zé Felipe.

No.	Title	English title	Length
1.	"Festa Infernal"	Hellish Party	3:34
2.	"Batuque"	Drum	3:59
3.	"À Sombra de um Horizonte"	In the Shadow of an Horizon	5:09
4.	"Misterioso Trem"	Mysterious Train	5:19
5.	"Corações Partidos"	Broken Hearts	3:41
6.	"Falo"	I Speak	4:15
7.	"Marcha Fúnebre"	Funeral March	3:39
8.	"O Corpo Real da Paolla"	Paolla's True Body	6:00
9.	"Capim-Gordura"	Molasses Grass	4:04
10.	"Teus Olhos"	Your Eyes	4:39
11.	"The Sky"		5:05
12.	"Tudo ao Mesmo Tempo"	Everything at the Same Time	4:01
13.	"Depois da Festa"	After the Party	3:35

== Personnel ==
- Rogério Skylab – vocals, production
- Leandro Braga – piano, arrangements
- Rodrigo Scofield – drums
- Pedro Aune – bass guitar, acoustic bass
- Solange Venturi – photography
- Carlos Mancuso – cover art
