= Damião Experiença =

Brazilian outsider musician (1935–2016)

- Damião as seen on the front cover of his 1974 debut album Planeta Lamma
- Born: Damião Ferreira da Cruz; September 27, 1935: Santo Amaro de Ipitanga, Bahia, Brazil; (present-day Lauro de Freitas)
- Died: December 10, 2016 (aged 81); Rio de Janeiro, Rio de Janeiro, Brazil
- Resting place: Saint John the Baptist Cemetery, Rio de Janeiro, Brazil
- Occupations: Singer-songwriter; lyricist; multi-instrumentalist; record producer
- Years active: 1973–1994; 2007–2009
- Musical career
- Genres: Acid rock, experimental rock, noise rock, freak folk, MPB, proto-punk, reggae, psychedelic rock, lo-fi, outsider music, brega
- Instruments: Vocals, classical guitar, electric guitar, bongo, marimba, shakers, drum kit, harmonica
- Labels: Gravadora Planeta Lamma, Discos Destruição

Damião Ferreira da Cruz (September 27, 1935 – December 10, 2016), better known by his stage name Damião Experiença, (Note: Alternate spellings of his name, as they appear on his albums, include Dam[m]inhão Experiênça/Esperiênça, Damião Experiência, or Daimeão/Daimião Experyênça, among other combinations.) was a Brazilian singer-songwriter, lyricist, multi-instrumentalist, record producer, and compulsive hoarder. Considered a major icon of the Brazilian countercultural scene and one of the country's most famous and prolific outsider musicians, he was praised by figures such as Tony Bellotto, George Israel, and Rogério Skylab, and also regularly compared to the likes of Arthur Bispo do Rosário, Frank Zappa, Moondog, Captain Beefheart, Sun Ra, Jandek, and Father Yod. His albums, usually sold in the streets or handed out for free, became much-sought collector's items, and his reclusive, eccentric, and unpretentious personality attained him a passionate cult following.

== Biography ==
Damião Ferreira da Cruz was reportedly born on September 27, 1935, in Santo Amaro de Ipitanga (present-day Lauro de Freitas), Bahia, although this has never been independently verified. He experienced an unhappy childhood and was constantly mistreated by his parents, which led him to run away from home to Rio de Janeiro when he was between 10 and 13 years old. As a youth he served as a radar operator for the Brazilian Navy; while in the Navy he allegedly fell off a ship's crow's nest, hitting his head on the floor, which could have provoked his erratic mental state. It is also said (in his autobiography which comes as a bonus booklet on some of his albums) that once he was sentenced to solitary confinement for many years due to desertion. After his precocious retirement from the Navy in 1963 (probably because of his accident), he went on to live with a prostitute in a stilt house in the vicinity of the bairro of Estácio, became a pimp and was able to produce his records thanks to money obtained via procuring. Damião's first known recording was a guest appearance on Luiz Melodia's 1973 debut Pérola Negra – he provided backing vocals for the track "Forró de Janeiro" –, and subsequently came to adopt the stage name "Experiença" (a corruption of the Portuguese-language word for "experience", "experiência") as an homage to his favorite band and major influence, The Jimi Hendrix Experience. In 1974 he self-released his first album, Planeta Lamma, and many others followed throughout the 1970s to the early 1990s. Damião also claimed that, during this period, he toured through many countries, such as Mexico, Colombia, Cuba, and Trinidad and Tobago, but the authenticity of this story is dubious.

Well known for his unsociable personality, he always avoided interviews and attention from the media, even refusing to give autographs or sign any documents. (Rogério Skylab, one of Damião's most enthusiastic fans, has dedicated his 2002 album Skylab III to him; in 2012 he tried to interview Damião for his talk show Matador de Passarinho, but he vehemently declined the invitation. Jô Soares also tried many times to interview the musician, to no avail.) In 1994 he was invited for a guest appearance on the debut album by experimental rock band Professor Antena, to which he agreed; however, he refused to sign the record label's contract, and never received any money or credit on the album for his part. Soon after he began a long hiatus, in which he only appeared throughout sporadic shows (one of them famously alongside Lulu Santos) and did not release any further albums, and at a certain point of the early 2000s was even presumed dead.

He resurfaced in 2007, releasing two albums: Sarafina 1937 and Amorzinho 1914, the supposed names of his mother and father, respectively. In 2009 he toured around São Paulo in a series of shows, alongside avant-garde bands Zumbi do Mato and Supersimetria, and musicians Rogério Skylab, Walter Franco and his son, Diogo Franco. After these performances he began yet another hiatus, alleging that he could no longer perform because of his advanced age and failing health, and that he was running short of money to put up with more albums as often as before. His final known release was the 2013 compilation Cemitério Nazista II; it was his only album not to come out through his usual label, Gravadora Planeta Lamma, founded by himself.

Damião never married and, as far as it is known, had no children. Until the final days of his life, he lived alone in a run-down and rubbish-filled apartment next to the Cantagalo–Pavão–Pavãozinho favela complex, receiving a monthly disability pension from the Navy. Sometimes he could be spotted wandering aimlessly through the streets of Ipanema and the General Osório Square, mistaken for a beggar by passersby unaware of his musical career. He died on December 10, 2016, aged 81, and was buried two days later at the Saint John the Baptist Cemetery. Only two people (a fan of his who happened to be around and a neighbor) attended his funeral.

== Musical style ==
Damião's musical style is impossible to categorize accurately, since he experiments with numerous genres, more prominently freak folk, psychedelic rock, reggae and experimental rock. His songs have no logical sense at first sight, and mostly of them are sung in a dialect created by him, the "Planet Lamma dialect" (spoken in his eponymous "home planet"), with improvised lyrics.

His discography is vast, with numbers varying between 24 and over 38 albums depending on the source, all of them in vinyl format (Damião has stated that he never planned to re-release his catalogue in CD) and recorded at a small studio inside his apartment. Among his lyrical themes are support for authoritarian and dictatorial régimes (particularly Nazism and communism), the apartheid and the Rastafari movement; opposition to abortion, feminism, wage labor and any forms of organized religion; drugs; sex; homosexuality; semiotics and planets created by him, while alluding to personalities such as João Cândido, Isabel and Eva Perón, Bob Marley, Pieter Willem Botha, Adolf Hitler, Fidel Castro, Manuel du Bocage and Getúlio Vargas. His albums' covers are collages made with newspaper and magazine scraps and photographs of himself, in a style similar to the albums by Nigerian musician Fela Kuti.

He usually plays different instruments and sings at the same time. In his earlier releases, Damião used exclusively guitars with different numbers of strings (e.g., his debut Planeta Lamma was played with a one-string guitar), harmonicas, shakers and occasionally marimbas, mixing Portuguese with his own dialect in his lyrics. This style is prominent in his aforementioned 1974 debut, Planeta Lamma, continuing in its follow-ups 69 (also from 1974) and Damião Experiença no Planeta Lavoura (1978). His later releases from the 1980s/early 1990s were more elaborate, counting with the presence of a full band; in the vocals, he abandons his characteristic dialect to sing in a broken Portuguese with heavily sexual and political lyrics, often mixing incompatible ideologies. These characteristics are more predominant in the albums Planeta Guerrilha and Ezabelitaperonsim.

== Films ==
A short "cinéma vérité-style" documentary film about Damião, entitled Daminhão Experiença: O Filme and directed by Ricardo Movits and Jimi Figueiredo, premiered online on December 15, 2016; five days after his death. It is one of the very few interviews to which Damião agreed to partake in. The film was originally shot in 2007, and a trailer was uploaded to the duo's YouTube channel the following year. Around 2015, Movits and Figueiredo announced they were working on two other films about Damião: Marinheiro Só (a documentary in which they interview artists who knew and/or were influenced by Damião) and O Mendigo do Planeta Lamma (a biographical film based on Damião's autobiography). No further news regarding any of the two projects emerged since then.

Another short documentary, entitled ADEUSDAMIÃO2016FIM and directed by Liebert Rodrigues and Flor Castilhos, premiered on YouTube on August 13, 2020; it was originally shot shortly before his death in 2016.

== Partial discography ==
=== Dated albums ===
- 1974: Planeta Lamma
- 1974: 69
- 1978: Damião Experiença no Planeta Lavoura
- 1992: Comando Planeta Lamma
- 1992: Guerrilheiro do Planeta Lamma
- 1992: Boca Fechada Não Entra Mosquito, Só Felicidade
- 2007: Amorzinho 1914
- 2007: Sarafina 1937
- 2013: Cemitério Nazista II (compilation album)

=== Albums with unknown release date ===
- 4C/308
- Damião Experiença no Planeta Roça
- Damião Experiença Chupando Cana Verde no Planeta Lamma / Damião Experiença Cheirando Alho no Planeta Lamma
- Damião Experiença no Planeta Mendigo
- Planeta Quentão
- Planeta Cachaça
- Planeta Cabelo
- Daimião
- Daimião Experiença Quinteto Planeta Lamma or Alta Fidelidade
- Planeta Galinha / Bocagi
- Planeta Guerrilha
- Planeta Guerra 1914
- AdeusAdolfHitler1945fim
- Ezabelitaperonsim
- A Morte É a Dor, a Dor É a Morte, Eu Amo a Morte
- Cemitério Nazismo
- Praça Vermelha
- M19 Bomba Atômica
- Fim do Mundo

=== As a guest musician ===
Luiz Melodia

- 1973: Pérola Negra (backing vocals in "Forró de Janeiro")

Professor Antena

- 1994: Professor Antena (additional vocals; uncredited)

== Bibliography ==
- Planeta Lamma (self-published; date unknown)

== Filmography ==
Year	Title	Role	Notes
2016	Daminhão Experiença: O Filme	Himself	Archive footage
2020	ADEUSDAMIÃO2016FIM	Himself	Archive footage
