= Skylab IX =

Live album by Rogério Skylab
- Released: September 2, 2009
- Recorded: September 2008
- Venues: Centro Cultural São Paulo, São Paulo, Brazil
- Genres: Experimental rock; art rock; noise rock; samba rock; MPB
- Length: 1:12:27
- Label: Self-released
- Producer: Rogério Skylab

Rogério Skylab chronology
Skylab VIII (2008)	Skylab IX (2009)	Rogério Skylab & Orquestra Zé Felipe (2009)

Professional ratings
Review scores
Source	Rating
Scream & Yell	8/10 link
Puro Pop	(favorable) link
Fanatismo Indeciso	(favorable) link

Skylab IX is a live album by the Brazilian musician Rogério Skylab, the ninth in his series of ten eponymous, numbered albums and his second live album overall following Skylab II from 2000. It was self-released on September 2, 2009 and recorded in September the previous year during a gig at the Centro Cultural São Paulo. The album includes guest appearances by Löis Lancaster of Zumbi do Mato (who previously collaborated with Skylab on Skylab II), Maurício Pereira of Os Mulheres Negras (with whom Skylab wrote "O Mundo Tá Sempre Girando", off his 2007 release Skylab VII) and Marcelo Birck of Graforreia Xilarmônica (who co-wrote the previously unreleased track "Samba de uma Nota Só ao Contrário", whose title parodies Tom Jobim's 1963 hit "Samba de uma Nota Só"). A live DVD of the performance, the first in Skylab's career, was simultaneously released; it contains more tracks than the CD version.

== Critical reception ==
Marcelo Costa of Scream & Yell gave the album a positive rating of 8 out of 10, stating that "its tracks chronicle the pinnacle of Skylab's career" and calling Skylab "the personification of political incorrectness". Webzine Puro Pop also spoke favorably of the album – calling it a "competent production" – and of Skylab's stage performance. Rodrigo Manhães of blog Fanatismo Indeciso called it a "celebration of the sickening side of the human mind", praising its repertoire and the guest appearances by Maurício Pereira, Marcelo Birck and Löis Lancaster. He directed minor criticism to the fact that Skylab seemed to be "in a hurry to finish singing certain songs", but in the end "[Skylab IX] is a great introduction to [Rogério Skylab's] work and an invitation to know his previous outputs".

== Track listing ==
=== CD ===
All tracks are written by Rogério Skylab, except for "O Mundo Tá Sempre Girando" by Skylab and Maurício Pereira and "Samba de uma Nota Só ao Contrário" by Skylab and Marcelo Birck.

No.	Title	English title	Length
1.	"Sem Anestesia"	Without Anesthesia	5:28
2.	"Vácuo"	Void	8:50
3.	"O Mundo Tá Sempre Girando" (feat. Maurício Pereira)	The World Is Always Spinning	4:27
4.	"Matadouro de Almas"	Slaughterhouse of Souls	3:56
5.	"Funérea"	Funereal	2:49
6.	"Carrocinha de Cachorro-Quente"	Hot-Dog Cart	3:18
7.	"Porrada na Cabeça (Note: Originally issued as "Música para Paralítico" on Skylab IV)"	Blow to the Head	1:37
8.	"Você Vai Continuar Fazendo Música?"	Will You Continue Making Music?	4:04
9.	"Naquela Noite"	In That Night	4:27
10.	"Samba de uma Nota Só ao Contrário" (feat. Marcelo Birck)	One-Note Samba Played Backwards	5:08
11.	"Oficial de Justiça"	Bailiff	3:44
12.	"Samba" (feat. Löis Lancaster)		6:27
13.	"Eu Tô Sempre Dopado"	I'm Always High	2:41
14.	"Show d'O Rappa"	O Rappa Show	5:26
15.	"Você É Feia"	You're Ugly	4:55
16.	"Matador de Passarinho"	Bird Killer	5:04

=== DVD ===
All tracks written by Rogério Skylab, except for "O Mundo Tá Sempre Girando" by Skylab and Maurício Pereira; "Samba de uma Nota Só ao Contrário" by Skylab and Marcelo Birck; and "Dá um Beijo na Boca Dele" by Skylab and Zé Felipe.

1. "Sem Anestesia"
2. "A Dança do Corpo e dos Membros" (Note: Originally issued as "Corpo e Membro sem Cabeça" on Skylab VII)
3. "Vácuo"
4. "Jesus!"
5. "Eu Chupo o Meu Pau"
6. "Derrame"
7. "Dedo, Língua, Cu e Boceta"
8. "O Mundo Tá Sempre Girando" (feat. Maurício Pereira)
9. "Motosserra"
10. "Convento das Carmelitas"
11. "Parafuso na Cabeça"
12. "Lava as Mãos"
13. "Matadouro de Almas"
14. "Funérea"
15. "Carrocinha de Cachorro-Quente"
16. "Porrada na Cabeça"
17. "Você Vai Continuar Fazendo Música?"
18. "Samba de uma Nota Só ao Contrário" (feat. Marcelo Birck)
19. "Lágrimas de Sangue"
20. "Naquela Noite"
21. "Dá um Beijo na Boca Dele"
22. "Oficial de Justiça"
23. "Eu Fico Nervoso"
24. "Metrô"
25. "Samba" (feat. Löis Lancaster)
26. "Eu Tô Sempre Dopado"
27. "Show d'O Rappa"
28. "Você É Feia"
29. "Desperdício de Tudo"
30. "Matador de Passarinho"

== Personnel ==
- Rogério Skylab – vocals, production
- Marcelo Birck – electric guitar in "Samba de uma Nota Só ao Contrário"
- Maurício Pereira – additional vocals, saxophone in "O Mundo Tá Sempre Girando"
- Thiago Martins – electric guitar
- Pedro Dantas – bass guitar
- Alexandre Guichard – classical guitar
- Bruno Coelho – drums
- Löis Lancaster – additional vocals, trombone in "Samba"
- Carlos Mancuso – photography, cover art
- Vânius Marques – mixing, mastering, audio editing
