= Fora da Grei =

Studio album by Rogério Skylab
- Released: 1992
- Recorded: 1992
- Studio: Estúdio Clave de Fá
- Genre: Acoustic music; lo-fi; MPB
- Length: 36:49
- Label: Self-released
- Producer: João Ataíde

Rogério Skylab chronology
Fora da Grei (1992)	Skylab (1999)

Fora da Grei (Portuguese for Outside the Flock) is the debut album by the Brazilian musician Rogério Skylab; self-released in 1992, it is the musician's only album to initially come out in vinyl format as well as his only main studio release not to be part of a series. Its title is intended to be a pun on the Portuguese-language term "fora da lei" ("outlaw").

The album can be downloaded for free on Skylab's official website.

== Background ==
Prior to the album's release, Rogério Skylab (stage name of Rogério Tolomei Teixeira), a graduate in literature and philosophy from the Federal University of Rio de Janeiro, worked as a bank officer at a Banco do Brasil agency; even though he had performed with a short-lived punk rock group, Setembro Negro, during the mid- to late 1980s, Skylab once claimed that he originally never thought about pursuing a career as a musician, instead wanting to dedicate himself to literature or becoming a teacher.

In 1991, "just for fun", Skylab travelled to Juiz de Fora, Minas Gerais, to partake at a well-known music festival which used to be held there. His entry, "Samba do Skylab" (from which he subsequently took his stage name), won the festival's first-place cash prize. He then used the money to finance the production of Fora da Grei. Despite the album's "dismal production quality", since "at the time independent records in Brazil were like aliens" in Skylab's words, Fora da Grei was critically acclaimed to the point of even being considered one of the best releases of the year by the Jornal do Brasil, and the musician was invited many times by Jô Soares to promote it on his late-night talk shows, Jô Soares Onze e Meia and later the Programa do Jô, what would effectively launch his musical career. However, Skylab wouldn't work on a follow-up until 1999, when he released his first of ten eponymous albums.

== Legacy ==
The track "Naquela Noite" would be re-recorded for his next release, Skylab. "Blues do Para-Choque" was re-recorded for Skylab III, "Casas da Banha" for Skylab VIII and "Palavras São Voláteis" for Melancolia e Carnaval.

In 2023, "Naquela Noite" was chosen by music news website Esquina Musical as one of "MPB's scariest songs".

== Track listing ==
All tracks are written by Rogério Skylab.

Side A
No.	Title	English title	Length
1.	"Fora da Grei"	Outside the Flock	3:06
2.	"Blues do Para-Choque"	Bumper Blues	3:30
3.	"Tucuruí"		2:10
4.	"Palavras São Voláteis"	Words Are Volatile	4:05
5.	"Casas da Banha"	Lard Houses	3:09
6.	"Essa Voz"	This Voice	2:02

Side B
No.	Title	English title	Length
7.	"Polka"		5:16
8.	"Minha Vida É uma Estrada"	My Life Is a Road	7:17
9.	"Naquela Noite"	In That Night	3:51
10.	"Uma Ideia na Mão e um Violão Vagabundo na Cabeça"	An Idea in My Hand and a Crappy Guitar in My Head	2:57
Total length:			36:49

== Personnel ==
- Rogério Skylab – vocals
- Alexandre Guichard – charango, mandolin, ten-string guitar
- Raimundo Nicioli – keyboards
- João Ataíde – bass guitar, production
- Edson Cortes, Don Fla – percussion
- Ayrton Seixas Jr. – cover art
- Adriano Raimundo – photography
- Tita Albuquerque – mixing
- Ricardo Misutani – mastering
- Marcos Petrillo – executive production
