= Rogério Skylab & Orquestra Zé Felipe =

Studio album by Rogério Skylab and Zé Felipe
- Released: 2009
- Recorded: July 2009
- Studio: Estúdio BPM
- Genre: Experimental rock; noise rock; minimal music
- Length: 47:25
- Label: Self-released
- Producer: Rogério Skylab

Rogério Skylab chronology
Skylab IX (2009)	Rogério Skylab & Orquestra Zé Felipe (2009)	Skygirls (2009)

Rogério Skylab & Orquestra Zé Felipe (Portuguese for "Rogério Skylab & the Zé Felipe Orchestra") is a collaborative album between Brazilian musicians Rogério Skylab and Zé Felipe, bassist of experimental rock act Zumbi do Mato. Self-released in 2009, it is the second collaboration between Skylab and Felipe (the first being Skylab's 2007 release Skylab VII, in which Felipe co-authored a handful of songs). Originally intended as a full-fledged collaboration between Skylab and Zumbi do Mato, after a series of creative divergences only Zé Felipe remained as collaborator. The album could be downloaded for free on Skylab's official website until it was taken down for unknown reasons.

In a Facebook post from October 22, 2015, Skylab announced that a second installment was on the works, but no further news emerged since then.

"Tem Cigarro Aí?" would be re-recorded ten years later for Skylab's album Crítica da Faculdade do Cu; "Marcha Fúnebre" eleven years later for Cosmos; "A Gente Vai Ficar Surdo" thirteen years later for Caos e Cosmos, Vol. 2; and "Pas, Pes, Pis, Pos, Pus" fifteen years later for Trilogia do Fim, Vol. 1.

== Track listing ==
All lyrics are written by Rogério Skylab; all music is composed by Zé Felipe.

No.	Title	English title	Length
1.	"A Gente Vai Ficar Surdo"	We're Going to Get Deaf	4:47
2.	"Dominante ou Dominada?"	Dominant or Dominated?	3:58
3.	"A Múmia"	The Mummy	3:30
4.	"Preto, Negro, Crioulo"	Black, Brown, Nigger	4:12
5.	"Ai, Coitado de Mim!"	Oh, Poor Me!	4:12
6.	"Pas, Pes, Pis, Pos, Pus"		5:57
7.	"Tem Cigarro Aí?"	Got a Cigarette Over There?	5:21
8.	"Se Você Não Duvidasse Tanto"	If You Didn't Doubt So Much	3:44
9.	"Um Lado É Diferente do Outro"	One Side Is Different from the Other	4:33
10.	"Marcha Fúnebre"	Funeral March	7:14

== Personnel ==
- Rogério Skylab – vocals, production
- Zé Felipe – bass guitar, piano (track 6), mixing, mastering
- Bruno Coelho, Vinícius Costa – drums
- Pedro Sucupira – sax
- Luiz Henrique Magalhães – trombone
- Lucas Pereira Benevides – melodica
- Vinícius Pinho – keyboards (tracks 2, 3 and 7)
- Kayo Luiz – keyboards (tracks 1, 4, 5, 8, 9 and 10)
- Solange Venturi – cover art
