= O Rei do Cu =

Studio album by Rogério Skylab
- Released: May 17, 2018
- Recorded: 2018
- Studio: Centro Municipal de Referência da Música Carioca Artur da Távola, Estúdio Hi-Eight
- Genre: Experimental rock; art rock; MPB
- Length: 46:09
- Label: Self-released
- Producer: Rogério Skylab

Rogério Skylab chronology
Skylab EP (2017)	O Rei do Cu (2018)	Skylab & Tragtenberg, Vol. 3 (2018)

Professional ratings
Review scores
Source	Rating
radiocultfm	Favorable link

O Rei do Cu (Portuguese for "The King of the Ass") is the thirteenth studio album by the Brazilian musician Rogério Skylab, and the first installment of a trilogy, the "Trilogia do Cu" ("Trilogy of the Ass"). It was self-released on May 17, 2018, and sees Skylab returning to the experimental and eclectic sonority he had previously developed in his 1999–2011 Skylab series of 10 albums and abandoned in his then-most recent "Trilogia dos Carnavais" (2012–2015). It can be downloaded for free in the musician's official website, and is also available for streaming.

== Background ==
According to Skylab, the album's name (and the trilogy it is part of) was inspired by a controversial statement given by fellow musician Lulu Santos in late December 2017, in which he stated "MPB was de-evolving into its 'anal phase'", alluding to the then-recently released music video for Anitta's "Vai Malandra". Indirectly criticizing the statement, Skylab then replied that, "to affirm this tendency, [his] next album would have ass everywhere".

On March 7, 2018, Skylab announced on his Facebook page that he already began working on such album, and that it would be called O Rei do Cu. On the same post, he also said that it would be the first installment of a new trilogy, the "Trilogia do Cu".

On April 2, 2018, Skylab uploaded to his SoundCloud page a brief 30-second teaser of one of the tracks that would be featured on the album, "Dedo no Cu e Gritaria", which was inspired by an obscure Internet meme originated in Brazilian shitposting communities. The track "Eu Durmo Pouco pra Ficar com Sono" premiered live on Danilo Gentili's late-night talk show The Noite on April 24, 2018. A show promoting the album's release took place at the Baden Powell Room of the Teatro Copacabana in Rio de Janeiro on April 25, 2018.

== Critical reception ==
Ipitácio Oliveira of radiocultfm gave O Rei do Cu a positive review, calling it a "lyrical" album "less psychedelic than its predecessors", what makes it "more accessible to new listeners". He ended his review praising Skylab as "one of the most original and unorthodox singers of all time".

== Legacy ==
In 2024, Skylab would re-record the track "O Impossível" for his album Trilogia do Fim, Vol. 2.

== Track listing ==
All tracks are written by Rogério Skylab.

No.	Title	English title	Length
1.	"Eu Durmo Pouco pra Ficar com Sono"	I Sleep Little So I Can Feel Sleepy	5:14
2.	"Dedo no Cu e Gritaria"	Ass-Fingering and Shouting	4:40
3.	"O Eco da Queda"	The Echo of the Fall	3:05
4.	"O Impossível"	The Impossible	3:39
5.	"Meu Signo"	My Sign	2:04
6.	"O Grande Fim"	The Great End	3:07
7.	"Cara de Cu"	Ass-Face	3:40
8.	"Antes que o Dia Amanheça"	Before the Morning Comes	3:18
9.	"Jeneci, Kassin, Tulipa" (feat. Thiago Amud and Mi Alvelli)		5:03
10.	"Maré Cheia"	Full Tide	3:01
11.	"O Preto do Brizola"	Brizola's Black	3:58
12.	"O Rei do Cu"	The King of the Ass	5:15

== Personnel ==
- Rogério Skylab – vocals, production
- Thiago Martins – electric guitar
- Yves Aworet – bass guitar
- Alex Curi – drums
- Thiago Amud, Mi Alvelli – co-lead vocals (track 9)
- Daniel Nakamura – mixing, mastering
- Solange Venturi – cover art
