= Skylab V =

Studio album by Rogério Skylab
- Released: 2004 (original version); 2005 (re-release)
- Recorded: August 2003
- Studio: Cia. dos Técnicos
- Genre: Experimental rock; art rock; noise rock; samba rock; MPB
- Length: 1:06:01 (original version); 1:10:53 (re-release)
- Label: OutraCoisa (original version); Self-released (re-release)
- Producer: Rogério Skylab

Rogério Skylab chronology
Skylab IV (2003)	Skylab V (2004)	Skylab VI (2006)

Singles from Skylab V
- 1. "Fátima Bernardes Experiência" Released: March 10, 2023

Professional ratings
Review scores
Source	Rating
Scream & Yell	8/10 link
ISTOÉ	link

Skylab V is the fifth studio album by the Brazilian musician Rogério Skylab, the fifth in his series of ten eponymous, numbered albums. It was released in 2004 through Lobão's now-defunct label and magazine OutraCoisa. The album is notable for its censored track "Fátima Bernardes Experiência", which was omitted to avoid any controversies regarding Bernardes and Glória Maria, who is also mentioned on the song's lyrics. In 2005, Skylab himself re-issued the album on a very limited run, re-introducing the censored song. In 2023, nineteen years after Skylab V's original release, "Fátima Bernardes Experiência" was re-issued as a single.

The album (including "Fátima Bernardes Experiência") can be downloaded for free on Skylab's official website. A music video for "Você Vai Continuar Fazendo Música?" was released on March 18, 2025, and on March 26 the song was also re-issued as a single.

== Critical reception ==
Skylab V has been called "the quintessential Skylab album". It won the Prêmio Claro de Música Independente in the "Best MPB Album" category in 2005; it was the first (and so far only) prize Skylab won. Commenting on it, he said, "ironically, it was the most rock album [he] ever produced".

Marcelo Costa of Scream & Yell gave the album a positive rating of 8 out of 10, calling it "a classic". He, however, criticized the "last-minute" omission of the track "Fátima Bernardes Experiência" of the original release. Writing for magazine ISTOÉ, José Flávio Júnior called Skylab a "schizoid poet of the absurd [whose] poetry is highlighted by an anachronistic hard rock" and a "gratuitous provocateur". He gave the album 4 stars out of 5, but also lamented the omission of "Fátima Bernardes Experiência".

Website La Cumbuca included Skylab V in 71st place in its list of the Top 200 Brazilian Albums of the 2000s. Skylab II, IV and VII were also featured on the list, in 24th, 42nd and 110th place, respectively.

== Track listing ==
All tracks are written by Rogério Skylab.

No.	Title	English title	Length
1.	"Os Ratos"	The Rats	3:17
2.	"Tarado"	Pervert	3:41
3.	"Você Vai Continuar Fazendo Música?"	Will You Continue Making Music?	4:08
4.	"Não Sou Ninguém"	I'm No One	2:58
5.	"22×2=43"		4:22
6.	"Homem do Mal"	Evil Man	2:27
7.	"Eu Fico Nervoso"	I Get Nervous	3:44
8.	"Legal, Legal"	Nice, Nice	2:59
9.	"Mastigando um Chiclete"	Chewing Bubble Gum	4:51
10.	"A Natureza"	The Nature	4:56
11.	"Semana Passada"	Last Week	3:58
12.	"Viver Morrendo"	Live Dying	4:15
13.	"Aquela Coisa Toda"	That Whole Thing	3:46
14.	"Dinheiro"	Money	2:55
15.	"Você É Feia"	You're Ugly	4:46
16.	"O Coveiro"	The Gravedigger	4:50
17.	"Eu Tô Pensando"	I'm Thinking	4:02

2005 re-release bonus track
No.	Title	English title	Length
8.	"Fátima Bernardes Experiência"	Fátima Bernardes Experience	4:52

== Personnel ==
- Rogério Skylab – vocals, production
- Thiago Amorim – electric guitar
- Rodrigo Saci – bass guitar
- Bruno Coelho – drums
- Alexandre Guichard – classical guitar
- Vânius Marques – mixing
- Luiz Tornaghi – mastering
- Solange Venturi – photography
- Carlos Mancuso – cover art
