= Skylab II (album) =

Live album by Rogério Skylab
- Released: 2000
- Recorded: 2000
- Venue: Hipódromo Up, Rio de Janeiro, Brazil
- Studio: Estúdio Manhatte
- Genre: Experimental rock; art rock; MPB
- Length: 1:01:35
- Label: Self-released
- Producer: Rogério Skylab

Rogério Skylab chronology
Skylab (1999)	Skylab II (2000)	Skylab III (2002)

Professional ratings
Review scores
Source	Rating
Disco Furado	(favorable) link

Skylab II is a live album by the Brazilian musician Rogério Skylab, the second in his series of ten eponymous, numbered albums. His first ever live album, it was self-released in 2000 and recorded during a gig at the Hipódromo Up in Rio de Janeiro in the same year. Löis Lancaster, vocalist of experimental rock band Zumbi do Mato (one of Skylab's greatest influences), was a guest musician on the album, providing additional vocals for the track "Samba". Nine years later, Lancaster would return for Skylab IX. The album is considered one of Skylab's finest by fans and critics alike, and the songs "Convento das Carmelitas" and "Carrocinha de Cachorro-Quente" eventually became set list regulars after appearing here in recorded form for the first time. A studio re-recording of "Cu e Boca" would appear six years later on Skylab VI; afterwards, "Ato Falho" and "Música Suave" were re-recorded for Caos e Cosmos, Vol. 2 in 2022.

The album can be downloaded from Skylab's official website.

== Background ==
After working with famous producer Robertinho do Recife on Skylab I and feeling unsatisfied with the final product, Skylab decided to take on production of his subsequent releases himself, to obtain greater creative control – something he claimed he didn't have while working on Skylab I, hence his unsatisfaction. As a result, he once stated that he prefers Skylab II over its predecessor, under the pretext that "[Skylab II] is 100% Skylab. [Skylab I] was 80% Robertinho".

== Critical reception ==
Blog Disco Furado gave the album a positive review, saying that "while on his first album Skylab seemed restrained by Robertinho do Recife's production, it is on this one he could showcase the pungency his lyrics needed". It also called Skylab's backing band "excellent".

Website La Cumbuca included Skylab II in 24th place in its list of the Top 200 Brazilian Albums of the 2000s. Skylab IV, V and VII were also featured on the list, in 42nd, 71st and 110th place, respectively.

== Track listing ==
All tracks are written by Rogério Skylab.

No.	Title	English title	Length
1.	"Metrô"	Subway	3:09
2.	"Jesus!"		3:23
3.	"Carne Humana"	Human Flesh	2:33
4.	"Motosserra"	Chainsaw	3:54
5.	"Naquela Noite"	In That Night	3:24
6.	"Convento das Carmelitas"	Convent of the Carmelites	3:33
7.	"Derrame"	Stroke	2:13
8.	"Urubu"	Vulture	4:28
9.	"Matadouro de Almas"	Slaughterhouse of Souls	3:29
10.	"Sensações/Fora da Grei"	Sensations/Outside the Flock	4:47
11.	"Música Suave"	Soft Music	3:10
12.	"Ato Falho"	Parapraxis	1:45
13.	"Carrocinha de Cachorro-Quente"	Hot-Dog Cart	3:41
14.	"Privada Entupida"	Clogged Toilet	3:54
15.	"Funérea"	Funereal	2:39
16.	"Cu e Boca"	Ass and Mouth	3:10
17.	"Samba" (feat. Löis Lancaster)		4:34
18.	"Matador de Passarinho"	Bird Killer	3:41

== Personnel ==
- Rogério Skylab – vocals, production
- Wlad – bass guitar
- Alexandre Guichard – classical guitar
- Marcelo B. – drums
- Alexandre BG – electric guitar
- Löis Lancaster – additional vocals, trombone (track 17)
- Solange Venturi – photography
- Flávio Lazarino – cover art
- Bienvenido – technical operator
