= Skylab (album) =

Studio album by Rogério Skylab
- Released: 1999; 2022 (re-release)
- Recorded: 1999
- Studio: Estúdio Lagoa
- Genres: Experimental rock; art rock; post-punk; MPB
- Length: 38:08
- Labels: Self-released; Bilesky Discos (re-release)
- Producer: Robertinho do Recife

Rogério Skylab chronology
| Fora da Grei (1992) | Skylab (1999) | Skylab II (2000) |

Singles from Skylab
- 1. "Matador de Passarinho" Released: 1999

Professional ratings
Review scores
| Source | Rating |
|---|---|
| Brazilian Music Review | (favorable) link |

Skylab, also retroactively referred to as Skylab I, is the second studio album by the Brazilian musician Rogério Skylab, the first in his series of ten eponymous, numbered albums. It was self-released in 1999 and produced by Robertinho do Recife (famous for his previous collaborations with Xuxa Meneghel, Hermeto Pascoal, Fagner and Geraldo Azevedo, among others), who also played the guitar and did the musical arrangements. The album is notable for containing Skylab's most famous composition, "Matador de Passarinho", among other hits which became staples of his live performances, such as "Motosserra", "Matadouro de Almas", "Funérea" and "Naquela Noite", the latter a re-recording from his previous album, Fora da Grei. "Pedigree" was re-recorded twenty-three years later for Caos e Cosmos, Vol. 2. A music video for "No Cemitério" was released on December 31, 2025.

The album can be downloaded for free on Skylab's official website. In 2022 it was re-issued in a limited, vinyl edition by Bilesky Discos.

== Background ==
Seven years after the release of his critically acclaimed debut Fora da Grei, Skylab thought it was time for him to sign with a record label to fulfill one of his "life-long dreams", and so went to Robertinho do Recife for help, since "at the time he was the one who appointed a new name for the big labels". However, after the album was released, Skylab was slightly unsatisfied with the final product, claiming that he had little creative control over production and that it had "way too much keyboards", what led him to give up signing with labels and taking a "do-it-yourself approach" for his subsequent albums.

== Critical reception ==
Brazilian Music Review gave Skylab a favorable review, saying that "while the songs lack harmonically, [Skylab] is able to express himself stylistically quite well", and that "even though the songs have macabre titles and lyrics, the comical air and the Sprechgesang-esque singing style change completely the grim tone".

== Track listing ==
All tracks are written by Rogério Skylab.

| No. | Title | English title | Length |
|---|---|---|---|
| 1. | "Motosserra" | Chainsaw | 3:29 |
| 2. | "Urubu" | Vulture | 4:37 |
| 3. | "Matador de Passarinho" | Bird Killer | 2:33 |
| 4. | "Matadouro de Almas" | Slaughterhouse of Souls | 3:51 |
| 5. | "Derrame" | Stroke | 2:46 |
| 6. | "No Cemitério" | In the Graveyard | 3:05 |
| 7. | "Funérea" | Funereal | 3:20 |
| 8. | "Naquela Noite" | In That Night | 4:15 |
| 9. | "Vampiro Mordido" | Bitten Vampire | 2:52 |
| 10. | "Pedigree" | | 3:45 |
| 11. | "Carne Humana" | Human Flesh | 3:30 |

== Personnel ==
- Rogério Skylab – vocals
- Luiz Antônio – keyboards
- Robertinho do Recife – guitar, arrangements, production
- Marcos Petrillo – executive production
