= Skylab IV =

Studio album by Rogério Skylab
- Released: 2003; March 26, 2026 (re-release)
- Recorded: January 2003
- Studio: Estúdio Rock House
- Genre: Experimental rock; art rock; noise rock; samba rock; MPB
- Length: 48:12 (original release); 55:06 (with bonus tracks); 58:47 (2026 re-release)
- Label: Self-released; Monstro Discos (2026 re-release)
- Producer: Rogério Skylab

Rogério Skylab chronology
Skylab III (2002)	Skylab IV (2003)	Skylab V (2004)

Skylab IV is the fourth studio album by the Brazilian musician Rogério Skylab, the fourth in his series of ten eponymous, numbered albums. Self-released in 2003, it was the musician's first album to be recorded live without an audience – a trend which would continue for his subsequent studio releases. A music video for the track "Parafuso na Cabeça" came out in the same year, also the first-ever music video of his career; it was directed by Gustavo Caldas. A second music video, for "Mictório", was released on February 24, 2025, and on March 15 the song was re-issued as a stand-alone single. The boy depicted in the album's cover is Skylab's nephew, as he would state in a later interview with Jô Soares.

The album can be downloaded for free on Skylab's official website. The digital download version comes with the bonus tracks "Câncer no Cu" and "Chico Xavier & Roberto Carlos"; Skylab himself, "in an example of 'self-censorship'", omitted them from the original physical release for considering them too controversial, even for his standards. On March 26, 2026, Skylab IV was re-released by Monstro Discos in a special 20th-anniversary edition, including three outtakes.

A live recording of "Música para Paralítico" appeared on Skylab's 2009 live album Skylab IX under the alternate title "Porrada na Cabeça". The reasons for the title change are unknown.

== Critical reception ==
Website La Cumbuca included Skylab IV in 42nd place in its list of the Top 200 Brazilian Albums of the 2000s. Skylab II, V and VII were also featured on the list, in 24th, 71st and 110th place, respectively.

== Track listing ==
All tracks are written by Rogério Skylab.

No.	Title	English title	Length
1.	"IML"		2:57
2.	"Arrebentados"	Trashed	4:00
3.	"O Meu Pau Fica Duro"	My Dick Gets Hard	2:59
4.	"Puta"	Whore	1:25
5.	"Música para Paralítico"	Music for Cripples	1:33
6.	"Eu Quero Saber Quem Matou"	I Want to Know Who Killed	2:39
7.	"Parafuso na Cabeça"	Screw in the Head	4:11
8.	"Bunda Suja"	Dirty Butt	3:12
9.	"Um Carro"	A Car	4:06
10.	"Ninguém"	Nobody	2:44
11.	"Lava as Mãos"	Wash Your Hands	4:50
12.	"Mictório"	Urinal	3:29
13.	"Eu Esporro"	I Cum	3:16
14.	"Desarmônica"	Disharmonic	4:48
15.	"Por Dentro, por Fora"	Inside, Outside	1:55

Digital download version bonus tracks
No.	Title	English title	Length
16.	"Câncer no Cu"	Ass Cancer	3:10
17.	"Chico Xavier & Roberto Carlos"		3:44

2026 re-release bonus tracks
No.	Title	English title	Length
10.	"Euvira"		4:12
17.	"Eu Quero"	I Want	3:21
18.	"Posso Ser Judeu"	I Could Be Jewish	3:03

== Personnel ==
- Rogério Skylab – vocals, production
- Thiago Amorim – electric guitar
- Rodrigo Saci – bass guitar
- Bruno Vieira – drums
- Alexandre Guichard – classical guitar
- Luiz Tornaghi – mastering
- Solange Venturi – photography
- Luísa Bousada – cover art
