= Abismo e Carnaval =

Studio album by Rogério Skylab
- Released: 2012
- Recorded: August 2012
- Studio: Estúdio Base
- Genres: Samba; bossa nova; MPB
- Length: 46:49
- Label: Self-released
- Producer: Rogério Skylab

Rogério Skylab chronology
Skylab X (2011)	Abismo e Carnaval (2012)	Melancolia e Carnaval (2014)

Professional ratings
Review scores
Source	Rating
Território da Música	link

Abismo e Carnaval (Portuguese for "Abyss and Carnival") is the tenth studio album by the Brazilian musician Rogério Skylab; the first installment of what he calls the "Trilogia dos Carnavais" (Trilogy of the Carnivals). It was self-released in 2012. Contrasting with the rock-influenced sonority of Skylab's previous releases, the three albums of the Trilogia dos Carnavais head towards a softer, less experimental direction inspired by Brazilian traditional genres, such as samba, bossa nova and MPB, and by the Tropicalista movement.

MPB pioneer Jorge Mautner was a guest musician on the album; he co-wrote and provided additional vocals for the track "Palmeira Brasileira".

The album can be downloaded for free on Skylab's official website.

== Critical reception ==
The album has received positive reviews upon its release; writing for Território da Música, Edi Fortini gave it 3 stars out of 5, commenting that "it may sound a little weird at first if you're used to Skylab's previous releases", but "this estrangement gradually fades away" and that, "in the end, the musician achieves the perfect union between rhythm and lyrics". She particularly praised the tracks "Um Acorde Imperfeito", "Só", "Eu Sou uma Pedra" and "Equivocidade".

== Track listing ==
All tracks are written by Rogério Skylab, except for "Palmeira Brasileira" by Skylab and Jorge Mautner.

No.	Title	English title	Length
1.	"Abismo e Carnaval"	Abyss and Carnival	3:20
2.	"Sem Saída"	No Exit	3:48
3.	"Um Acorde Imperfeito"	An Imperfect Chord	2:58
4.	"Palmeira Brasileira" (feat. Jorge Mautner)	Brazilian Palm Tree	4:36
5.	"Seca e Capim"	Drought and Grass	3:51
6.	"Empadinha de Camarão"	Shrimp Pot Pie	3:29
7.	"Se Fosse Impossível a Canção"	If the Song Was Impossible	3:55
8.	"Só"	Alone	5:28
9.	"Num Banco da Praça"	At a Bench in the Square	5:09
10.	"Baleia de Aquário"	Aquarium Whale	4:15
11.	"Eu Sou uma Pedra"	I'm a Stone	2:21
12.	"Equivocidade"	Equivocality	3:58

== Personnel ==
- Rogério Skylab – vocals, production
- Luizinho Dias – soprano sax, tenor sax
- Chico Dafé – drums, percussion
- Lúcio Dário – bass guitar
- Conjunto Camerato – string sextet
- Jorge Mautner – additional vocals (track 4)
- Luiz Antônio Gomes – mixing, mastering
- Solange Venturi – cover art
