= Skylab III =

Studio album by Rogério Skylab
- Released: 2002
- Recorded: June 2001
- Studio: Estúdio DRS
- Genres: Experimental rock; art rock; MPB
- Length: 42:37
- Label: Self-released
- Producer: Rogério Skylab

Rogério Skylab chronology
Skylab II (2000)	Skylab III (2002)	Skylab IV (2003)

Skylab III is the third studio album by the Brazilian musician Rogério Skylab, the third in his series of ten eponymous, numbered albums. It was self-released in 2002.

Skylab acknowledges that Skylab III was heavily influenced, both lyrically and musically, by one of his greatest idols, outsider musician Damião Experiença; the album was dedicated to him, and the track "Esqueletos" opens up with a lengthy sample of one of Damião's songs.

"Blues do Para-Choque", originally featured on Skylab's debut Fora da Grei, was re-recorded for this release. "Cântico dos Cânticos" contains numerous samples from Rogério Sganzerla's 1968 film The Red Light Bandit and Arrigo Barnabé's song "Clara Crocodilo". "É Tudo Falso" uses samples from the songs "Willie the Pimp" by Frank Zappa and "Mongo" by Zumbi do Mato; it, alongside "Segunda-Feira", originally featured in the 2002 compilation Tributo ao Inédito.

The album can be downloaded for free on Skylab's official website.

== Track listing ==
All tracks are written by Rogério Skylab.

No.	Title	English title	Length
1.	"Segunda-Feira"	Monday	3:52
2.	"Acorda, Siva Maria"	Wake Up, Siva Maria	2:23
3.	"Lágrimas de Sangue"	Tears of Blood	4:34
4.	"Inferno"	Hell	5:08
5.	"Blues do Para-Choque"	Bumper Blues	3:34
6.	"Dólar"	Dollar	3:35
7.	"Cocô"	Poop	3:42
8.	"Esqueletos"	Skeletons	4:44
9.	"Cântico dos Cânticos"	Canticle of Canticles	5:09
10.	"É Tudo Falso" (instrumental)	Everything Is Fake	3:11
11.	"Tiger"		2:41

== Personnel ==
- Rogério Skylab – vocals, production
- Toni Boca – electric guitar (tracks 1 to 9)
- Wlad – bass guitar (tracks 1 to 9)
- Sérgio Naciffe – drums (tracks 1 to 9)
- Alexandre Guichard – classical guitar (tracks 1 to 9)
- Alexandre BG – electric guitar (track 11)
- Leonel Vilar – bass guitar (track 11)
- Marcelo Paz – drums (track 11)
- Duda Suliano – mixing
- Luiz Tornaghi – mastering
- Solange Venturi – photography
- Luísa Bousada – cover art
