= Desterro e Carnaval =

Studio album by Rogério Skylab
- Released: 2015
- Studio: Estúdio Supernova
- Genres: Samba; bossa nova; MPB
- Length: 1:07:11
- Label: Self-released
- Producer: Rogério Skylab

Rogério Skylab chronology
Melancolia e Carnaval (2014)	Desterro e Carnaval (2015)	Skylab & Tragtenberg, Vol. 1 (2016)

Professional ratings
Review scores
Source	Rating
Galeria Musical	link
Coliseu de Ideias	3/10 link

Desterro e Carnaval (Portuguese for "Exile and Carnival") is the twelfth studio album by the Brazilian musician Rogério Skylab; the final installment of what he calls the "Trilogia dos Carnavais" (Trilogy of the Carnivals). It was self-released in 2015, and unlike Skylab's previous albums, it didn't see a physical release, being only available through digital download; a trend which would continue for his subsequent outputs. The album counted with guest appearances by Arrigo Barnabé, Michael Sullivan, Luís Capucho, Fausto Fawcett and Tavinho Paes.

"Lívia" is a Portuguese-language version of "Delia's Gone", an American folk song popularized by Johnny Cash. "Mariana" is fully sung in French.

== Critical reception ==
Writing for Galeria Musical, Felipe Lucena gave Desterro e Carnaval the maximum score of 5 stars out of 5, calling it a "delicate and sensitive output" with "reflexive and melancholic lyrics". Conversely, Raul Lima de Albuquerque of Coliseu de Ideias spoke very negatively of the album, calling it "uneven [...] the worst installment of the Trilogia dos Carnavais; definitely inferior to its predecessor [...] weak and uninspired", ultimately rating it with a 3 out of 10. He also criticized the fact that the album didn't receive a physical release, but considered its production "the only good thing about it".

== Track listing ==
All tracks are written by Rogério Skylab, except for "Desde Quando Eu Era Bem Menino" by Skylab and Michael Sullivan; "Eu Era Feliz" by Skylab and Tavinho Paes; and "A Árvore" by Skylab and Fausto Fawcett.

No.	Title	English title	Length
1.	"Branco do Brasil"	Brazilian White	3:53
2.	"Pedro Juan Caballero"		5:36
3.	"Deixa" (feat. Luís Capucho)	Let It	4:17
4.	"Atravesso os Dias"	I Cross the Days	3:51
5.	"Desde Quando Eu Era Bem Menino" (feat. Michael Sullivan)	Ever Since I Was a Little Boy	4:41
6.	"O que te Perturba"	What Disturbs You	2:38
7.	"As Ondas Sonoras"	The Sound Waves	4:45
8.	"Longe de Você"	Far Away from You	2:59
9.	"Quanto Tempo?"	How Long?	4:57
10.	"Tão Perto e Longe"	So Near and Far	4:28
11.	"Quando Voltava das Festas"	When I Came Back from the Parties	3:42
12.	"O Elefante"	The Elephant	2:42
13.	"Sem Você"	Without You	3:23
14.	"Mariana"		2:49
15.	"Lívia" (feat. Arrigo Barnabé)		3:15
16.	"Eu Era Feliz" (feat. Tavinho Paes)	I Used to Be Happy	3:52
17.	"A Árvore" (feat. Fausto Fawcett)	The Tree	5:17

== Personnel ==
- Rogério Skylab – vocals, production
- Luiz Antônio Gomes – keyboards, piano, percussion, mixing, mastering
- Adelson Viana – accordion (track 11)
- Filipe Bohlke – flute (tracks 3 and 9)
- Gesiel Nascimento – flugelhorn (track 2)
- Luís Capucho – additional vocals (track 3)
- Michael Sullivan – additional vocals (track 5)
- Arrigo Barnabé – additional vocals (track 15)
- João Gevaerd – additional vocals (track 16)
- Micheline Cardoso – additional vocals (track 16)
- Tavinho Paes – additional vocals (track 16)
- João Linhares – additional vocals (track 16)
- Fausto Fawcett – additional vocals (track 17)
- Solange Venturi – cover art
