= Melancolia e Carnaval =

Studio album by Rogério Skylab
- Released: 2014
- Studio: Estúdio Base, Estúdio Jam House
- Genre: Samba; bossa nova; MPB
- Length: 42:30
- Label: Self-released
- Producer: Rogério Skylab

Rogério Skylab chronology
| Abismo e Carnaval (2012) | Melancolia e Carnaval (2014) | Desterro e Carnaval (2015) |

Professional ratings
Review scores
| Source | Rating |
|---|---|
| Notas Musicais | link |
| Território da Música | link |
| Coliseu de Ideias | (favorable) link |
| Scream & Yell | 8/10 link |

Melancolia e Carnaval (Portuguese for "Melancholy and Carnival") is the eleventh studio album by the Brazilian musician Rogério Skylab; the second installment of what he calls the "Trilogia dos Carnavais" (Trilogy of the Carnivals). It was self-released in 2014, and includes guest appearances by musicians Romulo Fróes and Jards Macalé, and by the Estação Primeira de Mangueira samba school.

"Cogito" is a poem by Torquato Neto set to music by Skylab. "Palavras São Voláteis" is a re-recording of a song originally released on Fora da Grei. "Hino Americano" is sung to the tune of the national anthem of the United States, "The Star-Spangled Banner". A music video was made for the track.

The album can be downloaded for free on Skylab's official website.

== Critical reception ==
Melancolia e Carnaval has received positive reviews since its release. Mauro Ferreira of blog Notas Musicais gave it 3.5 stars out of 5, stating that the album "balances the traditional and the unusual" and that it is "beautifully strange". Rafael Sartori of Território da Música called the album "surprising", "coherent" and "simplistic in a good way", giving it 3 stars out of 5. Raul Lima de Albuquerque of Coliseu de Ideias spoke favorably of the album, calling it "tasteful and subtle". Marcelo Costa of Scream & Yell called the album "poetic and melodic", and praised the guest appearances by Jards Macalé and Romulo Fróes. He proceeded to give the album a rating of 8 out of 10. Writing for Yahoo! in 2015, critic Regis Tadeu included Melancolia e Carnaval in his list of "five great albuns that reinvigorate Brazilian music".

In late December 2014, website UOL set up a public poll asking readers to vote on the best albums of the year; Melancolia e Carnaval was featured in first place in the "MPB" category.

== Track listing ==
All tracks are written by Rogério Skylab, except for "Cogito" by Torquato Neto.

| No. | Title | English title | Length |
|---|---|---|---|
| 1. | "Elegante, Decadente" (feat. Romulo Fróes) | Elegant, Decadent | 3:04 |
| 2. | "Beira do Cais" | By the Docks | 4:05 |
| 3. | "Palavras São Voláteis" | Words Are Volatile | 5:02 |
| 4. | "Hino Americano" | American Anthem | 3:13 |
| 5. | "Cogito" (feat. Jards Macalé) | I Ponder | 2:58 |
| 6. | "Desmanchar" | To Dismantle | 3:41 |
| 7. | "Aqui Todo Mundo É Preto" | Everyone's Black Here | 4:31 |
| 8. | "Tudo É Tão Deprê" | Everything's So Depressing | 4:14 |
| 9. | "Eu Corro" | I Run | 4:31 |
| 10. | "Curador" | Curator | 2:59 |
| 11. | "Vamos Esquecer" (feat. Velha Guarda da Mangueira) | Let's Forget About It | 4:06 |

== Personnel ==
- Rogério Skylab – vocals, production
- Alexandre Guichard – classical guitar
- Luiz Antônio Gomes – classical guitar (track 7), bass guitar, keyboards, mixing, mastering
- Jards Macalé – additional vocals, classical guitar (track 5)
- Romulo Fróes – additional vocals (track 1)
- Velha Guarda da Mangueira – additional vocals (track 11)
- Bruno Coelho – drums, percussion
- Thiago Martins – electric guitar
- Samuel Ramos – trombone (track 7)
- Solange Venturi – cover art
