= Skylab VII =

Studio album by Rogério Skylab
- Released: 2007
- Recorded: September 2006
- Studio: Estúdio Cia. dos Técnicos
- Genre: Experimental rock; art rock; noise rock; samba rock; MPB
- Length: 1:18:19
- Label: Self-released
- Producer: Rogério Skylab

Rogério Skylab chronology
Skylab VI (2006)	Skylab VII (2007)	Skylab VIII (2008)

Professional ratings
Review scores
Source	Rating
Scream & Yell	8.5/10 link

Skylab VII is the seventh studio album by the Brazilian musician Rogério Skylab, the seventh in his series of ten eponymous, numbered albums. It was self-released in 2007, and counted with guest appearances by musicians Maurício Pereira (vocalist and saxophonist of the duo Os Mulheres Negras), Zé Felipe and Marlos Salustiano (bassist and keyboardist for avant-garde band Zumbi do Mato, respectively), who co-wrote some of the tracks alongside Skylab.

Skylab and Zé Felipe would come up with the collaborative output Rogério Skylab & Orquestra Zé Felipe two years later. In 2024, "A Irmã da Minha Mulher" and "Vou, Vou, Vou" were re-recorded for Trilogia do Fim, Vol. 2.

The album can be downloaded for free on Skylab's official website.

== Critical reception ==
Writing for Scream & Yell, Marcelo Costa gave the album a positive review of 8.5 out of 10, particularly praising the tracks "Qual Foi o Lucro Obtido?", "Dá um Beijo na Boca Dele", "A Irmã da Minha Mulher", "O Primeiro Tapa É Meu" and "Ei, Moço, Já Matou uma Velhinha Hoje?". He also jokingly stated that, "in comparison, Skylab makes Marilyn Manson look like Junior Lima".

The album was nominated to the Prêmio Dynamite de Música Independente, in the "Best Rock Album" category, in 2008, but lost to Cachorro Grande's Todos os Tempos. Website La Cumbuca included Skylab VII in 110th place in its list of the Top 200 Brazilian Albums of the 2000s; Skylab II, IV and V were also featured on the list, in 24th, 42nd and 71st place, respectively.

== Track listing ==
All tracks are written by Rogério Skylab, except for "Samba Isquemia Noise" by Skylab and Marlos Salustiano; "É Tudo Atonal", "Dá um Beijo na Boca Dele" and "Eu Vou Dizer" by Skylab and Zé Felipe; and "O Mundo Tá Sempre Girando" by Skylab and Maurício Pereira.

No.	Title	English title	Length
1.	"Qual Foi o Lucro Obtido?"	What Was the Profit Obtained?	2:10
2.	"Há Quanto Tempo?"	How Long?	4:15
3.	"Quanto Mais Saúde Eu Morro"	The More Health I Die	2:25
4.	"Samba Isquemia Noise"	Samba Ischemia Noise	6:27
5.	"Corpo e Membro sem Cabeça"	Headless Body and Limb	5:37
6.	"Eu Chupo o Meu Pau"	I Suck My Own Dick	8:02
7.	"É Tudo Atonal"	Everything Is Atonal	1:39
8.	"Dá um Beijo na Boca Dele"	Kiss Him in the Mouth	4:03
9.	"Chove Chuva na Minha Cabeça"	Rain Rains Over My Head	3:17
10.	"A Irmã da Minha Mulher"	My Wife's Sister	5:25
11.	"Ei, Moço, Já Matou uma Velhinha Hoje?"	Hey, Young Man, Have You Killed an Old Lady Today?	1:24
12.	"Eu Vou Dizer"	I'll Say	6:23
13.	"Vou, Vou, Vou"	I'm Going, I'm Going, I'm Going	5:52
14.	"O Primeiro Tapa É Meu"	The First Slap Is Mine	2:27
15.	"Desperdício de Tudo"	Waste of Everything	5:18
16.	"A Última Valsa"	The Last Waltz	3:35
17.	"As Asas de um Anjo"	The Wings of an Angel	6:38
18.	"O Mundo Tá Sempre Girando" (feat. Maurício Pereira)	The World Is Always Spinning	3:15

== Personnel ==
- Rogério Skylab – vocals, production
- Maurício Pereira – additional vocals, saxophone (track 18)
- Alex Curi – bass guitar
- Alexandre Guichard – classical guitar
- Bruno Coelho – drums
- Thiago Amorim – electric guitar
- Vânius Marques – mixing
- Luiz Tornaghi – mastering
- Solange Venturi – photography
- Carlos Mancuso – cover art
