= Skylab VI =

Studio album by Rogério Skylab
- Released: 2006
- Recorded: August 2005
- Studio: Estúdio Cia. dos Técnicos
- Genre: Experimental rock; art rock; noise rock; samba rock; MPB
- Length: 1:12:59
- Label: Self-released
- Producer: Rogério Skylab

Rogério Skylab chronology
Skylab V (2004)	Skylab VI (2006)	Skylab VII (2007)

Professional ratings
Review scores
Source	Rating
Pílula Pop	6/10 link

Skylab VI is the sixth studio album by the Brazilian musician Rogério Skylab, the sixth in his series of ten eponymous, numbered albums. Self-released in 2006, it is so far Skylab's longest album, totaling 19 tracks, and was responsible for spawning one of his most famous compositions, "Dedo, Língua, Cu e Boceta".

During one of the album's recording sessions, while heading to the studio, Skylab tripped, fell down and broke his jaw; a photograph of him in bandages, taken hours after the surgery he had to undergo, was used as the cover art.

A live version of the track "Cu e Boca" previously appeared on Skylab II. "Hino Nacional do Skylab" is sung to the tune of the Brazilian National Anthem. "Eu Não Tenho Eu" opens with a long excerpt of an interview museologist and carnavalesco Clóvis Bornay gave to Skylab in 2005, shortly before his death. "Para de Roncar, Filha da Puta!!!" was dedicated to Skylab's wife, who according to him snores during sleep; she provided the brief spoken word monologue which opens the album's first track, "Alucinação".

A music video was made for the track "Amo Muito Tudo Isso". A second video, for "Cadê Meu Pau?", came out on May 13, 2026.

The album can be downloaded for free on Skylab's official website.

== Critical reception ==
Writing for website Pílula Pop, Bráulio Lorentz gave Skylab VI a mixed review, rating it with a 6 out of 10. He stated that the album can be "quite repetitive lyrically with its constant references to the word 'ass'", but praised the tracks "Amo Muito Tudo Isso", "Eu e Você" and "Eu Não Tenho Eu" as "surprising".

== Track listing ==
All tracks are written by Rogério Skylab.

No.	Title	English title	Length
1.	"Alucinação" (feat. Solange Venturi)	Hallucination	7:42
2.	"Isto Não É John Cage"	This Is Not John Cage	1:01
3.	"Cu e Boca"	Ass and Mouth	3:15
4.	"Hino Nacional do Skylab"	National Anthem of Skylab	2:18
5.	"Vamos Repetir de Novo"	Let's Repeat It Again	4:03
6.	"Quer tc Comigo?"	Wanna Chat with Me?	4:55
7.	"Quanto Pior, Melhor"	The Worse, the Better	3:49
8.	"Amo Muito Tudo Isso"	I'm Lovin' It	3:09
9.	"Torto, Torto"	Crooked, Crooked	4:13
10.	"Tudo Me Faz Bem"	Everything's Good for Me	4:24
11.	"Cadê Meu Pau?"	Where's My Dick?	4:12
12.	"Dedo, Língua, Cu e Boceta"	Finger, Tongue, Ass and Pussy	3:41
13.	"Todo Mundo Mora Mal"	Everyone Lives Badly	4:30
14.	"Para de Roncar, Filha da Puta!!!"	Stop Snoring, Motherfucker!!!	4:28
15.	"Eu e Você"	Me and You	4:01
16.	"Põe a Cabeça no Cu"	Shove Your Head Up Your Ass	1:34
17.	"Eu Não Tenho Eu" (feat. Clóvis Bornay)	I Haven't Me	7:17
18.	"Me Dá Tudo que Tiveres"	Give Me Everything You Got	3:19
19.	"Tudo"	Everything	0:59

== Personnel ==
- Rogério Skylab – vocals, production
- Rodrigo Saci – bass guitar
- Alexandre Guichard – classical guitar
- Bruno Coelho – drums
- Thiago Amorim – electric guitar
- Gabriel Muzak – electric guitar
- Clóvis Bornay – spoken word vocals (track 17)
- Vânius Marques – mixing
- Luiz Tornaghi – mastering
- Solange Venturi – photography, spoken word vocals (track 1)
- Carlos Mancuso – cover art
