= Rogério Skylab =

Brazilian singer-songwriter and author (born 1956)

- Skylab in 2025
- Born: Rogério Tolomei Teixeira; September 2, 1956 (age 70); Rio de Janeiro, Federal District, Brazil
- Education: Federal University of Rio de Janeiro
- Occupations: Singer-songwriter; lyricist; classical guitarist; author; record producer; actor; TV presenter (2012–14)
- Years active: 1983–present
- Notable work: "Matador de Passarinho" (1999); Debaixo das Rodas de um Automóvel (2006); Lulismo Selvagem (2020)
- Spouse: Solange Venturi (m. 1983)
- Awards: Prêmio Claro de Música Independente (2005)
- Musical career
- Genres: Punk rock, progressive rock, experimental rock, noise rock, garage rock, art rock, funk rock, acoustic music, minimal music, MPB, comedy rock, electronica, samba rock, bossa nova, acid jazz, shock rock
- Instruments: Vocals, classical guitar
- Labels: OutraCoisa, Psicotropicodelia, Discobertas, Coqueiro Verde Records
- Website: rogerioskylab.com.br

Rogério Tolomei Teixeira (born September 2, 1956), known professionally as Rogério Skylab, is a Brazilian singer-songwriter, lyricist, classical guitarist, author, blogger, record producer, actor and short-lived television presenter. Describing himself as a "corpse within MPB", his unique musical style which granted him a passionate cult following is characterized by minimalism, repetition and eclecticism, and his writings are permeated by grotesque, shocking and offensive imagery; acerbic allusions to popular culture; metafictional and transgressive devices; absurdist, surreal and oftentimes macabre scenarios; pessimism; foul language; nihilism; and scatological and black comedy – although he has repeatedly denied that his work is purposefully humorous.

Some of his most recognizable compositions are "Matador de Passarinho" (which brought him into nationwide fame in the underground scene), "Motosserra", "Funérea", "Naquela Noite", "Carrocinha de Cachorro-Quente", "Dedo, Língua, Cu e Boceta", "Eu Chupo o Meu Pau", "Fátima Bernardes Experiência" and "Chico Xavier & Roberto Carlos" (the latter two being notable for having been censored from their original releases). Also dedicating himself to literature, he made his debut in 2006 with the poetry collection Debaixo das Rodas de um Automóvel, which was followed by several other works of fiction and non-fiction alike.

== Biography ==
=== Early life, Fora da Grei and Skylab I–IX (1956–2009) ===
Rogério Skylab was born Rogério Tolomei Teixeira in Rio de Janeiro, Brazil, on September 2, 1956, to a lawyer father killed in a car crash and a housewife mother, and is of Italian and Portuguese descent. He has degrees in literature and philosophy from the Federal University of Rio de Janeiro, and under pressure from his father he also began attending a law course, but never finished it.

Prior to his musical career, Skylab worked for 28 years as a public servant at a Banco do Brasil agency in Maracaju, Mato Grosso do Sul, sharing his time between Maracaju and his native Rio de Janeiro. Despite performing in music festivals around Brazil as early as 1983, and a brief stint as the vocalist of punk rock band Setembro Negro in the mid- to late 1980s, Skylab has claimed he wasn't originally interested on pursuing music professionally, but in 1991 he participated as a solo artist in a festival in Juiz de Fora, Minas Gerais; he won the first-place cash prize with the song "Samba do Skylab", from which he took his stage name, explaining that he considered himself "akin to a space station, picking up different transmissions here and there and fashioning them into a single whole". Rogério used the prize money to finance the recording of his debut album, Fora da Grei, which was released the following year; it was very well received by the critics, and awarded him many appearances on Jô Soares' late-night talk shows Jô Soares Onze e Meia and Programa do Jô throughout the 1990s and 2000s.

In 1999 he released his second album, the first one in a series of ten self-titled albums, Skylab. It was produced by Robertinho do Recife and spawned which is arguably his most well known song, "Matador de Passarinho", but Skylab was slightly unsatisfied with the final result, saying that it had "too much keyboards" and that he was not too creatively involved with it. His third album, Skylab II, was his first live release; commenting about it, he has stated that "this is 100% Skylab. The other was 80% Robertinho". Skylab II counted with a guest appearance by Löis Lancaster, vocalist of avant-garde group Zumbi do Mato – Lancaster would return for Skylab's second live album, Skylab IX, which also had guest appearances by Maurício Pereira (of Os Mulheres Negras) and Marcelo Birck (of Graforreia Xilarmônica). Zé Felipe and Marlos Salustiano, respectively bassist and keyboardist for Zumbi do Mato, collaborated with Skylab on his 2007 album Skylab VII, which was nominated to the Prêmio Dynamite de Música Independente in the "Best Rock Album" category; two years later, Felipe and Skylab made a collaborative album, Rogério Skylab & Orquestra Zé Felipe, which was removed from circulation for reasons unknown in later years. In 2005, Skylab won the Prêmio Claro de Música Independente, in the "Best MPB Album" category, for Skylab V, and in 2008 he was one of several guest musicians that took part in a tribute album celebrating the 40th anniversary of the Beatles' White Album, for which he contributed with a cover of "Revolution 9".

=== Skylab X, "Trilogia dos Carnavais", Skylab & Tragtenberg and Skylab EP (2011–2018) ===
After the release of Skylab X, Skylab put aside his experimental sound to work on the "Trilogia dos Carnavais" ("Trilogy of the Carnivals"), which focuses more on traditional Brazilian genres such as samba, bossa nova and MPB. The trilogy comprises the albums Abismo e Carnaval, Melancolia e Carnaval and Desterro e Carnaval (released in 2012, 2014 and 2015 respectively), and included the guest appearances of many musicians, such as Jorge Mautner, Jards Macalé, Romulo Fróes, Arrigo Barnabé, Fausto Fawcett and Michael Sullivan. Between 2016 and 2018 he collaborated with Lívio Tragtenberg on a further trilogy of albums aptly titled Skylab & Tragtenberg.

On November 15, 2017, he released the self-titled Skylab EP, which counted with guest appearances by São Paulo-based experimental/noise rock duo Farme&Hixizine and carioca electronica musician Cadu Tenório. Of its three tracks, only one ("Bocetinha de Cocô", a teaser for the then-unreleased final volume of the Skylab & Tragtenberg trilogy initially uploaded separately to YouTube as a single on November 5) was written by Skylab; the other two ("Let's Play That" and "Pra Dizer Adeus") are poems by Torquato Neto set to music by other artists, namely Jards Macalé and Edu Lobo, respectively. In 2020, Skylab and Tenório collaborated once more for the latter's album Monument for Nothing, with Skylab providing vocals and lyrics for the track "Entreportas".

=== "Trilogia do Cu" and "Trilogia do Cosmos" (2018–2023) ===
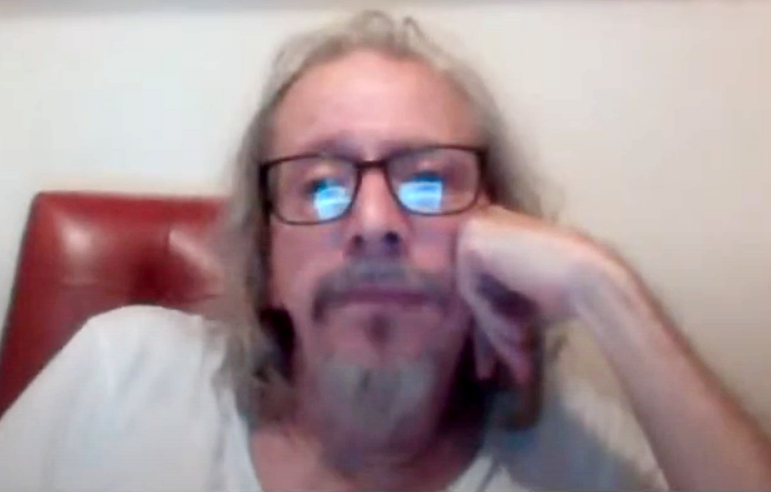
Skylab in 2021

On March 7, 2018, Skylab officially announced that he began work on a new studio album, entitled O Rei do Cu, released later that year on May 17. On a Facebook post he further elaborated that O Rei do Cu would be the first installment of a new trilogy, the "Trilogia do Cu" ("Trilogy of the Ass"); the second installment, Nas Portas do Cu, came out on January 1, 2019, and the third, Crítica da Faculdade do Cu, on December 20, 2019.

On March 19, 2020, he uploaded to his official YouTube channel the single "À Sombra de um Horizonte" as a teaser for his album Cosmos, the first installment of a new trilogy entitled the "Trilogia do Cosmos"; it was announced on his Facebook page on August 19 and released on October 2. The second installment, Os Cosmonautas, which was co-written alongside Lívio Tragtenberg, came out on December 24, 2020. On July 25, 2021, he uploaded the single "Cantos de Maldoror", a teaser for the final installment of the trilogy entitled Caos e Cosmos (itself a "trilogy within a trilogy", meant to be counted as a single release); a second single, "As Coisas que Ficaram por Dizer", was uploaded on August 16, and a third, "Será que Tem?", on September 1. The first volume of Caos e Cosmos was ultimately released on October 1, 2021. Volume 2 came out on August 5, 2022, preceded by a demo version of "A Gente Vai Ficar Surdo" uploaded as a single on July 15, which appears on the album as a bonus track. The concluding third volume, which is described as a concept album whose tracks "[receive] as titles names of streets and regions comprising a shameful history of Brazil" and, unlike all previous albums by Skylab, is entirely instrumental, came out on September 8, 2023, following the singles "Rua Barão de Mesquita", uploaded on February 3; "Alameda Casa Branca", uploaded on May 19; and "Vala de Perus", uploaded on July 28.

On February 6, 2022, he released Live, his first live album since 2016's Trilogia dos Carnavais: 25 Anos de Carreira ou de Lápide. It was recorded during a July 31, 2021 livestream he uploaded to his YouTube channel, celebrating the 30th anniversary of his professional musical career, and each track of it was taken from one of his respective albums, ranging from his debut Fora da Grei to his most recent release at the time, Os Cosmonautas. The recording of "Vampiro" was released as a teaser single on December 27, 2021.

On December 10, 2022, Skylab uploaded to YouTube the single "Juízo Final", a Nelson Cavaquinho cover, featuring Alexandre Kassin, who played the guitar and contributed with the arrangements.

=== "Trilogia do Fim" and "Trilogia da Putrefação" (2024–present) ===
Skylab during a performance at the Opinião bar in Porto Alegre, 2023

In an April 2023 interview for the website Tenho Mais Discos que Amigos, Skylab has commented on a potential new trilogy of albums following the end of the then-ongoing "Trilogia do Cosmos", entitled "Trilogia do Fim" ("Trilogy of the End"), stating that "it'll probably be [his] final work before [he] can die"; volume 1, which was co-written and co-produced alongside Cadu Tenório, was officially announced on November 3, its first seven singles being released in monthly installments starting with "Minha Música" and finishing with "Rainha do Mar" on May 17, 2024. The complete album would be finally released on August 16, 2024. Volume 2, written in collaboration with Leandro Braga (who had already worked with Skylab on some releases of the "Trilogia do Cosmos"), came out on August 30, and volume 3, a partnership with Löis Lancaster, came out on September 13. Notwithstanding his statement implying that he planned to end his discography with the "Trilogia do Fim", Skylab later backtracked on his decision, and announced a new studio album on February 15, 2025, with the release of the teaser single "Eu Vou te Dar". Later that same year, alongside Korzus vocalist Marcello Pompeu, he took part in the single "Ratamahatta" (a Sepultura cover) by Santa Catarina-based alternative metal band Panaceia.

On May 23, he confirmed a new series, the "Trilogia da Putrefação" ("Trilogy of Putrefaction"), with its first volume being released on August 15. Volume 2, another collaboration with Cadu Tenório, was released on October 31, and volume 3, co-written alongside Löis Lancaster, came out on November 28 following the single "Todo Mundo Comendo Todo Mundo". Simultaneously alongside the "Trilogia da Putrefação", he has also announced a parallel series of compilations, containing both re-recorded versions of older songs and previously unreleased tracks; the first in the series, Mesa de Dissecação, was released on September 19. A second compilation, produced by DJ João Brasil and originally slated for November, was preceded by the single "Alguma Coisa Caiu" on July 30.

2026 saw the release of the live album Nas Encruzas, on October 8, recorded at a show at the Teatro de Arena in Ribeirão Preto on June 14 of that year; on September 25, the recording of "O Meu Pau Fica Duro" was released as a teaser single. Later that year, on November 20, the single "É Preciso Esquecer Como Você se Chama" came out, preceding the new album Encosto, announced by Skylab on June 24.

=== Other projects ===
Parallel to his career in music, Skylab authored the sonnet collection Debaixo das Rodas de um Automóvel, published by Editora Rocco in 2006, and was the host of his own talk show, Matador de Passarinho, on Canal Brasil from 2012 to 2014. In 2017 he debuted as an actor, portraying a history teacher on the Fabrício Bittar comedy film Como se Tornar o Pior Aluno da Escola, based on Danilo Gentili's eponymous book, and in 2025 he played the titular psychiatrist of the psychological thriller short Ágatha Não Matou Seu Psiquiatra by João Augusto de Nardo. He also runs and owns the blog "Godard City", where he posts original poems and essays about music and literature. In 2020 he published the collection of political essays Lulismo Selvagem through Kotter Editorial, who also re-issued Debaixo das Rodas de um Automóvel after many years out of print. His third book, a literary study on Henry James' œuvre (focusing on The Turn of the Screw) entitled A Outra Volta da Outra Volta, was released in 2022. A second collection of poems, Futebol de Cego, was published on July 15, 2023. A Melodia Trágica, an anthology of essays on Brazilian musicology originally published in Godard City between 2009 and 2017, came out through Acorde Editorial on November 2, 2023. A volume of short stories, Homem-Urubu, was announced in December 2024 and published on March 21, 2025; a follow-up, entitled Homem-Rato, was announced by Skylab on April 14, 2026 and published later that year on June 26.

== Personal life and controversies ==
Skylab has been married to photographer, record producer and plastic artist Solange Venturi since 1983; they live in a house in the bairro of Botafogo. Venturi has designed the cover arts for most of the musician's albums since then. He is a self-described agnostic and has stated that, in regards to his work, "religion is a non-issue: it doesn't exist" in a 2002 web interview. A life-long fan of Fluminense, he has even recorded the club's anthem on the 2016 collaboration album Skylab & Tragtenberg, Vol. 1.

Known for his extensive and varied musical and literary influences, some of his favorite writers are Machado de Assis (whom he considers "his Bible and his God"), João Cabral de Melo Neto ("the greatest Brazilian poet of all time", in his words), Carlos Drummond de Andrade, Clarice Lispector, Jorge Luis Borges, James Joyce, Rubens Figueiredo, Milton Hatoum, Cristóvão Tezza and Paulo Leminski; he claims that Leminski's 1975 novel Catatau is "one of the most beautiful books" he has ever read, and wrote a song in tribute to it (aptly titled "Catatau") for his 2019 album Nas Portas do Cu. Musically, he cites Arrigo Barnabé, Itamar Assumpção, Os Mulheres Negras, Graforreia Xilarmônica, Zumbi do Mato, Frank Zappa, Jupiter Apple and Damião Experiença as influences; his 2002 album Skylab III was dedicated to Damião.

Skylab has expressed admiration towards former Governor of Rio de Janeiro Leonel Brizola (dedicating to him the song "O Preto do Brizola" off his 2018 album O Rei do Cu) and four-time petista President Luiz Inácio Lula da Silva; in a 2019 interview for radio program Pânico, broadcast by Jovem Pan FM, he described himself as "having ties to the left, [but] against political correctness". In 2016 he took part in the compilation A Música Contra o Golpe, organized by several other left-wing bands and artists in opposition to the impeachment of Dilma Rousseff, contributing with a cover of Gal Costa's "Três da Madrugada". From 2018 to 2022 he wrote a column for the left-leaning news website Brasil 247.

In mid-2018 Skylab was notoriously engaged in a feud with also Rio de Janeiro-based indie rock band Autoramas, towards which he displays a particular distaste; after posting on his Twitter page that he considered Autoramas "the worst band of all time", they replied disdainfully by saying "at least [they were] professional musicians, with shows all around the year and touring all around the world", finishing by calling Skylab an "amateur artist" and calling him out for supposedly having previously contacted their frontman Gabriel Thomaz to write songs for him. To this, Skylab then merely replied by calling Thomaz a "sick fuck" and telling him to "fuck off".

In January 2020, being interviewed for the podcast Flow, the musician criticized its hosts Bruno "Monark" Aiub and Igor Coelho for their approach, which he deemed "too informal", claiming that even though the podcast is supposed to "keep a casual tone", it is nevertheless a "journalistic [program], so one must be responsible for what they're saying". Skylab's comments would be considered "prophetic" by the media following Monark's dismissal due to his defense of the existence of a Nazi party on Flow two years later.

His controversial, unorthodox lyrical matter has resulted in three of his songs being censored in the early 2000s; claiming matters of "self-censorship", he himself removed "Câncer no Cu" and "Chico Xavier & Roberto Carlos" from his 2003 album Skylab IV, but both songs were eventually included as bonus tracks for free download on Skylab's official website. One year later, "Fátima Bernardes Experiência" was removed from Skylab V; however, it was restored to the album's track listing in a subsequent 2005 re-release and re-issued as a single in 2023.

== Discography ==
- Fora da Grei (1992)
- Skylab (1999)
- Skylab III (2002)
- Skylab IV (2003)
- Skylab V (2004)
- Skylab VI (2006)
- Skylab VII (2007)
- Skylab VIII (2008)
- Skylab X (2011)
- Abismo e Carnaval (2012)
- Melancolia e Carnaval (2014)
- Desterro e Carnaval (2015)
- O Rei do Cu (2018)
- Nas Portas do Cu (2019)
- Crítica da Faculdade do Cu (2019)
- Cosmos (2020)
- Os Cosmonautas (with Lívio Tragtenberg) (2020)
- Caos e Cosmos, Vol. 1 (2021)
- Caos e Cosmos, Vol. 2 (2022)
- Caos e Cosmos, Vol. 3 (2023)
- Trilogia do Fim, Vol. 1 (with Cadu Tenório) (2024)
- Trilogia do Fim, Vol. 2 (with Leandro Braga) (2024)
- Trilogia do Fim, Vol. 3 (with Löis Lancaster) (2024)
- Trilogia da Putrefação, Vol. 1 (2025)
- Trilogia da Putrefação, Vol. 2 (with Cadu Tenório) (2025)
- Trilogia da Putrefação, Vol. 3 (with Löis Lancaster) (2025)
- Encosto (2026)

== Bibliography ==
Poetry

- Debaixo das Rodas de um Automóvel ("Under the Wheels of an Automobile") (Editora Rocco, 2006; re-issued by Kotter Editorial in 2020)
- Futebol de Cego ("Blind Man's Soccer") (Kotter Editorial, 2023)

Essays

- Lulismo Selvagem ("Wild Lulism") (Kotter Editorial, 2020)
- A Melodia Trágica ("The Tragic Melody") (Acorde Editorial, 2023)

Literary criticism

- A Outra Volta da Outra Volta: Um Estudo Sobre Henry James ("The Turn of the Turn: A Study on Henry James") (Kotter Editorial, 2022)

Short stories

- Homem-Urubu ("Vulture-Man") (Madame Psicose, 2025)
- Homem-Rato ("Rat-Man") (Kotter Editorial, 2026)

== Filmography ==
=== Film ===
Year	Title	Role	Notes
2017	Como se Tornar o Pior Aluno da Escola	History teacher	
2025	Ágatha Não Matou Seu Psiquiatra	Psychiatrist	

=== Television ===
Year	Title	Role	Notes
2008	Fudêncio e Seus Amigos	Himself	Episode: "Cudi Copo"
2012–14	Matador de Passarinho	Himself (host)	

== Awards and nominations ==
Year	Award	Category	Result	Ref.
2005	Prêmio Claro de Música Independente	Best MPB Album (for Skylab V)	Won	
2008	Prêmio Dynamite de Música Independente	Best Rock Album (for Skylab VII)	Nominated	
