= Zumbi do Mato =

Brazilian noise rock band

- Origin: Rio de Janeiro, Rio de Janeiro, Brazil
- Genres: Experimental rock, noise rock, comedy rock, math rock, psychedelic rock, minimal music
- Years active: 1989–2013; 2024–present
- Labels: Qualé Maluco Records, Tamborete Records, Deckdisc
- Past members: See below

Zumbi do Mato (roughly translated into English as "Zombie from the Grasslands") is a Brazilian experimental and noise rock band from Rio de Janeiro famous for their humorous, surreal songs, written in a stream of consciousness-esque way and filled with acerbic allusions to popular culture – referencing in particular aspects such as Western philosophy and literature, daily life in Brazil, and real-life public figures and fictional characters from different forms of media –, technobabble, scatology, nonsense, and elaborate metafictional devices, word plays and puns.

Having amassed a strong cult following throughout the mid-1990s and 2000s which lasts to the present day, the group had many different line-ups during its tenure; the only members to remain on a consistent basis were vocalist/trombonist/lyricist Löis Lancaster, keyboardist/lyricist/illustrator Marlos Salustiano, bassist/lyricist Zé Felipe (Note: Not to be mistaken with the sertanejo universitário singer of the same name.) (the band's only remaining founding member until his departure in 2009), and drummer Henrique Ludgero, with the noticeable absence of a guitarist. Some of their most well-known compositions are "Potinho de Anhanha", "Tiroteio do Esqueleto sem Cabeça", "O Buraco do Jabor", "O Alien que Veio pro Espaço" and "Primo Pobre do Kassin", and among their vast musical influences they count Frank Zappa, David Bowie, King Crimson, Arrigo Barnabé, Damião Experiença (with whom they played a show in 2009), Iannis Xenakis, John Cage, and Tom Waits.

== History ==
Zumbi do Mato was formed in 1989, and released two demo tapes by the early to mid-1990s, the eponymous Zumbi do Mato (1992) and Macacomóvel (1995), which catapulted them into fame in the underground circuit. Macacomóvel in particular caught the attention of producer BNegão (also a member of rap rock group Planet Hemp), who signed them to his label Qualé Maluco Records in 1997; their debut album, Menorme, came out through the label the same year and was lauded by the likes of singer and poet Rogério Skylab and music critic Alexandre Matias. Two follow-ups, Pesadelo na Discoteca and Adorei a Mesinha, came out in 2000 and 2005 respectively by Tamborete Records.

In 2008 the band self-released the live album Toma, Figurão, recorded at a gig in Niterói and initially available for free download on their former official website; as of now, it can be purchased on their Bandcamp page. The album would later be included in website La Cumbuca's list of the Top 200 Brazilian Albums of the 2000s, in 121st place. In 2010 the EP Saideira do Zé, their final release with original bassist Zé Felipe, came out, containing studio outtakes from the Toma, Figurão sessions; the recordings, dating from 2008 to 2009, were originally planned to be included in a deluxe physical release of Toma, Figurão which never came through. A DVD of Zumbi do Mato's performance was also scheduled to be released at some point, but those plans were eventually scrapped as well.

Zumbi do Mato played its final show on January 13, 2013, after which Löis Lancaster announced the band's end.

In August 2024, Zumbi do Mato reunited to release their first studio album in 19 years, Bosasova Bova, recorded at Estúdio Hanói, Rio de Janeiro. The line-up for the sessions includes bassist Zé Felipe (who also worked as a producer), Löis Lancaster in the vocals, Gustavo Jobim as keyboardist and Renzo Borges playing drums. On February 2, 2026, they released the live album Calma, Juventude, recorded the year prior during a gig at the Audio Rebel hub.

== Legacy ==
Zumbi do Mato is known for its association with another famous musician of the Rio de Janeiro underground scene, Rogério Skylab; he has claimed it is one of his favorite bands and major influences, and at times has collaborated with members of the band. Skylab and Löis Lancaster sing the duet "Samba", included in his live albums Skylab II (2000) and Skylab IX (2009), and he was also a guest musician on the band's 2000 album Pesadelo na Discoteca (on the tracks "São Abdul", "Doente Porém Vivo", "Calendário 1999" and "Humilharal"). Zé Felipe and Marlos Salustiano co-wrote a handful of tracks of Skylab's 2007 album Skylab VII, and in 2009 Felipe and Skylab released a collaborative album, Rogério Skylab & Orquestra Zé Felipe, originally intended as a full-fledged collaboration between him and Zumbi do Mato. Lancaster was also an interviewee for Skylab's talk show Matador de Passarinho, and both have collaborated on the latter's albums Trilogia do Fim, Vol. 3 (2024) and Trilogia da Putrefação, Vol. 3 (2025).

A documentary about Zumbi do Mato's history, entitled Quem É Mais Idiota do que Eu?, was directed by Vítor Rocha and released to YouTube in 2017. To celebrate the film's release, the band's catalogue was remastered and re-released digitally by Deckdisc.

Lancaster released his debut solo album, Malva, in 2017. Besides his musical career, he published in 2003 the short poetry anthology Ceneida, and also co-wrote the experimental novel Palmyra with Eliana Pougy, which came out in 2011 by Confraria do Vento.

Marlos Salustiano released his first solo album, Animal Apócrifo, back in 2001. As fine artist he did one individual show in 2004, called "Macróbios 1,5" in Goiânia (CCC – Centro Cultural Chafariz) and took part in the collective "Art Takes Time Square" in 2012. More recently, in 2017, as "MarSaL" (contraction of his former artistic name), he launched his second solo album, AUTOMEMETERONIMONOMANO, a "surreoconcrète sonic adventure" with special guests Gustavo Jobim (former Zumbi keyboardist), Julian Quilodran (Módulo 1000) and Péricles Cavalcanti, paying homage to Noigandres, seminal Brazilian group of concrete poetry formed by Décio Pignatari, Haroldo de Campos and Augusto de Campos (with whom Marlos exchanged letters and sent a copy of Menorme in 1997).

== Discography ==
=== Studio albums ===
Year	Album
1997	Menorme: Label: Qualé Maluco Records; Format: CD
2000	Pesadelo na Discoteca: Label: Tamborete Records; Format: CD
2005	Adorei a Mesinha: Label: Tamborete Records; Format: CD
2024	Bosasova Bova: Label: Self-released; Format: Digital streaming

=== Live albums ===
Year	Album
2008	Toma, Figurão: Label: Self-released; Format: Digital streaming
2026	Calma, Juventude: Label: Self-released; Format: Digital streaming

=== Extended play ===
Year	Album
2010	Saideira do Zé: Label: Self-released; Format: Digital streaming

=== Demos ===
Year	Album
1992	Zumbi do Mato: Label: Self-released; Format: Cassette tape
1995	Macacomóvel: Label: Self-released; Format: Cassette tape

== Members ==
=== Current line-up ===
- Löis Lancaster – vocals, trombone (1994–2013, 2024–present), bass guitar (2010–2013)
- Zé Felipe – bass guitar (1989–2009, 2024–present)
- Gustavo Jobim – keyboards (2005–2013, 2024–present)
- Renzo Borges – drums (2006–2010, 2024–present)

=== Former members ===
- Tadeu Aor – vocals (1989)
- Alessandro "Fumê" Camacho – vocals (1989–1994)
- André Mansur – bass guitar (2010)
- Luciano Callado – keyboards (1989)
- Marlos Salustiano – keyboards (1990–2000)
- Ricardo Dias – keyboards (2000–2005)
- Érico Garcia – drums (1989–1992)
- Bernardo Carvalho – drums (1995–1998)
- Marcelo Pancinha – drums (1998)
- Henrique Ludgero – drums (1998–2005)
- David Oliveira – drums (2006)
- Fábio Bola – electronic drum (2010)
- Sandro Rodrigues – drums (2010–2013)
