= T&T =

T&T may refer to:

- Bangladesh Telegraph and Telephone Board, a state-owned telecommunication company
- T&T Supermarket, a Taiwanese-American-Canadian supermarket chain
- Tackey & Tsubasa, a duo of Japanese pop singers
- Tonkin + Taylor, an environmental and engineering consultancy in New Zealand
- Trinidad and Tobago, a country in the Caribbean, consisting of the islands of Trinidad, Tobago and various smaller islands
- Tunnels & Trolls, a fantasy role-playing game
- Phoenix Wright: Ace Attorney − Trials and Tribulations, a visual novel adventure game by Capcom
- T. and T., a 1987 Canadian television show starring Mr. T
- Another name for TNT (professional wrestling), a professional wrestling tag team
- Taylor Swift & Travis Kelce

== See also ==
- TNT (disambiguation)
- TT (disambiguation)
- T2 (disambiguation)
- 2T (disambiguation)
- T (disambiguation)
