= TTT =

TTT or Triple T may refer to:

== Science ==
- Time-temperature transformation, a plot of temperature versus time; see Isothermal transformation diagram
- Tangled Type Theory, an extension of Typed Set Theory; see New Foundations
- Phenylalanine, an amino acid with the codon TTT
- Tilt table test, a medical test for dysautonomia and/or syncope

== Arts, entertainment, and media ==
=== Films ===
- The Lord of the Rings: The Two Towers, 2002, adaptation of the Tolkien novel
- Thalaivar Thambi Thalaimaiyil, a 2026 Indian Tamil-language political satire film

=== Television ===
- Tinga Tinga Tales, a television cartoon series about animals
- The Green Death. a 1973 Doctor Who serial (production code TTT)
- Talk TV (Philippine TV network), an English-language news and talk television network in the Philippines
- Trinidad and Tobago Television, a television network in Trinidad and Tobago

=== Books ===
- The Two Towers, the second volume of J. R. R. Tolkien's novel The Lord of the Rings (1954)
- Tres tristes tigres (novel), 1967, by Guillermo Cabrera Infante

=== Games ===
- Tic-tac-toe
- Tekken Tag Tournament, the fourth installment of the Tekken fighting game series
- Trouble in Terrorist Town, a game mode for Garry's Mod

=== Music ===
- Triple Trip Touch, a free-jazz band

== Businesses and organisations ==
- Thalir Thiran Thittam, a life skills education program in India
- TT Technologies, a construction equipment manufacturer
- Taupo Totara Timber Company, a former timber company in New Zealand
  - Taupo Totara Timber Railway, a former railway in New Zealand built by the Taupo Totara Timber Company

== Other uses ==
- Taitung Airport, IATA code TTT
- Team time trial, a bicycle racing event
- "Triple T", a former name of the Sea FM radio station
- Morse code prefix for messages announcing safety warnings, equivalent of Sécurité
- Tung Tung Tung Sahur, an AI-generated fictional Internet meme character often abbreviated as "Triple T"

== See also ==
- TT (disambiguation)
- 3T (disambiguation)
- T3 (disambiguation)
