= 3T (disambiguation) =

3T is an American band.

3T may also refer to:

- 3T Cycling, an Italian cycle sport company
- 3T, a 2018 rap album by South African YoungstaCPT
- OnePlus 3T, a 2016 Chinese smartphone model
- Turan Air, a defunct Azerbaijani airline (IATA code: 3T)
- Taiwan, Tiananmen, Tibet, banned terms online in China

== See also ==
- T3 (disambiguation)
- TTT (disambiguation)
