= TT =

TT, Tt, tt, or .tt may refer to:

== Arts and entertainment ==
=== Gaming ===
- Manx TT Super Bike, an arcade racing game by Sega
- Tourist Trophy (video game), a motorcycle racing game for the PlayStation 2
- T.T., a character in Diddy Kong Racing

=== Music ===
- "TT" (song), by Twice
- Tritone, the musical interval of an augmented fourth or diminished fifth
- Theresa Wayman (born 1980), American musician, stage name TT
- Tying Tiffany (born 1978), Italian singer, stage name TT

=== Other arts and entertainment ===
- The Dominators (production code: TT), a 1968 Doctor Who serial
- T.T., a fictional character in the film The Forever Purge
- Thomas Thorpe (T.T.), the publisher of Shakespeare's sonnets
- Teen Titans, a superhero team from DC Comics

== Business and organizations ==
- TT Electronics, a British maker of automotive components
- Tom Tailor, a German clothing company
- TT Games, a British software producer
- TT News Agency, a Swedish news agency
- TT Technologies, a construction equipment manufacturer
- ThunderTalk Gaming, a Chinese esports organization
- Tigerair Australia (former IATA code: TT), a former low-cost airline
- Toytown Germany, a website for English-speaking foreigners in Germany
- Order and Justice (abbreviated TT in Lithuanian), a political party in Lithuania

== Language ==
- Tatar language (ISO 639-1 code)
- TT, an emoticon indicating tears streaming from the eyes
- Totus tuus, a Latin greeting meaning "all yours"

== Science and technology ==
=== Medicine ===
- Tetanus toxoid, a vaccine to prevent tetanus
- Thrombin time, a coagulation blood test

=== Computing ===
- .tt, the country code top-level domain for Trinidad and Tobago
- Template Toolkit, a Perl template engine
- Transaction translator, a particular unit in USB hubs
- tt-reduction (truth-table reduction), a kind of transformation used in computability theory
- <tt>...</tt> (short for teletype), an HTML presentation element that writes text in monospace font

=== Other science and technology ===
- TT earthing system (terre-terre), a system of electrical earthing
- TT pistol, a Soviet military automatic pistol designed by Fedor Tokarev
- Tiny Telephone, a type of phone connector
- Telegraphic transfer (T/T), a method of transferring money
- Terrestrial Time, an astronomical time standard

== Sports ==
- Time trial, in racing sports, a race against the clock to secure the fastest time
- TT Pro League, a professional association football league for clubs in Trinidad and Tobago

=== Motorcycle races ===
- Isle of Man TT, an annual motor-cycle racing event held on the Isle of Man
  - TT Zero, an Isle of Man TT race for solo motorcycles producing low-emissions
- Dutch TT, a motorcycling event, held on the last Saturday of June
- Welsh TT, historic motorcycle road races originally held annually on Pendine Sands, Wales, UK circa 1920
- Welsh TT, historic motorcycle road races originally held annually at Mynydd Epynt, Wales, UK circa 1950

== Transportation ==
- Audi TT, a 2-door sports car produced by Audi
- TT (New York City Subway service), a former New York City Subway service, US

== Other uses ==
- Therapeutic touch, a pseudoscientific energy therapy
- TT pistol, a Soviet military automatic pistol designed by Fedor Tokarev
- TT scale, a niche model railroading scale
- Trinidad and Tobago (ISO 3166 code)
- Trust Territory, a former geopolitical status
- TT bar, a ten tola gold bar
- Theban Tombs, catalog designation of the tombs of Theban Necropolis, Egypt

== See also ==
- Atari TT030, a computer based on the Motorola 68030 CPU
- TT-Line, a German shipping company
- TT-Line Company, a ferry company operating the Spirit of Tasmania service, Australia
- Pi (letter) (Π)
- TTT (disambiguation)
- T&T (disambiguation)
- 2T (disambiguation)
- T2 (disambiguation)
- T-square (disambiguation)
- Tourist Trophy (disambiguation)
