= Toytown (disambiguation) =

Toytown may refer to

- Toytown, a BBC children's radio programme which later became an ITV stop motion television series
- Toytown (horse), equine partner of Zara Phillips
- Toytown Germany, an English-language community website for Germany
- English shopping web-site for children; budget U.S. children's resource site
- A nickname locals use for Poundbury, Prince Charles' model community
- Toytown, considered by some media to be the fictional town of Noddy (Enid Blyton's original books named it Toyland)
- Term of abuse for record label Motown, coined by the UK music press in the 1970s
- Toy Town is a Happy Hardcore song by Hixxy and Sharkey from 1995
