= Tii =

Tii or TII may refer to:

- Tii language of Indonesia
- Tiene language of DR Congo (ISO 639-3 code tii)
- Tii (song), an Estonian song
- Tarinkot Airport, southeastern Afghanistan (IATA code: TII)
- Tiye (c. 1398 BC – 1338 BC), wife of Egyptian pharaoh Amenhotep III.
- Transport Infrastructure Ireland, a state agency, manages road and transport infrastructure in Ireland
- Technology Innovation Institute, research body of the Abu Dhabi government, concerned with quantum computing, AI, robotics, cryptography etc.
- Transporter Industry International, conglomerate of companies in the heavy duty vehicles industry
- Tiiism, an open mindedness when searching for truth in philosophies and religions

== See also ==
- T2 (disambiguation)
