= Memorial and Education Centre Andreasstraße =

Former Stasi prison and now museum in Erfurt, Germany

Gedenk- und Bildungsstätte Andreasstraße Memorial and Education Centre Andreasstraße
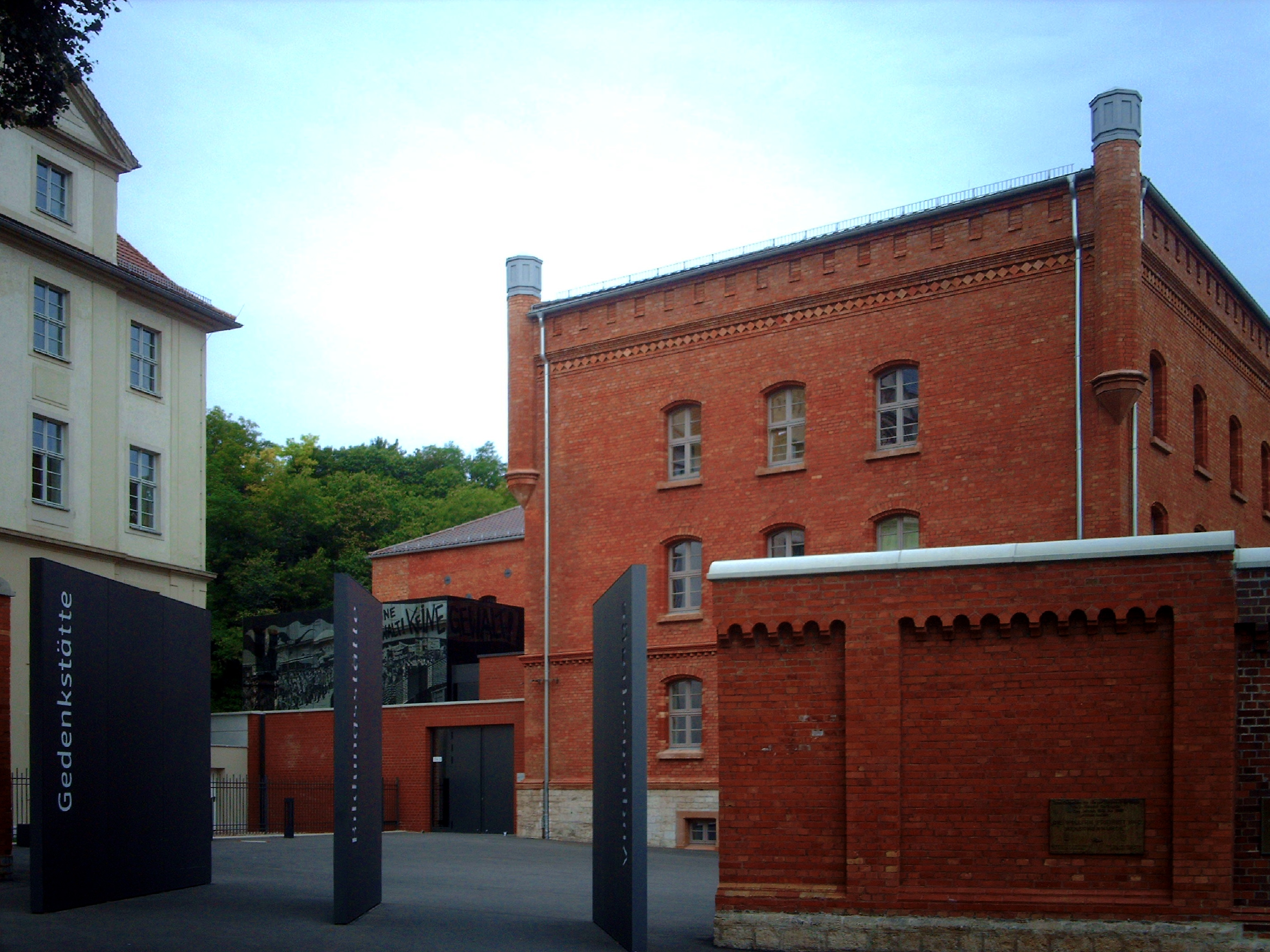

- Location within Thuringia Location within Germany
- Established: 4 December 2013
- Location: Andreasstraße 37, Erfurt
- Coordinates: 50°58′43″N 11°01′24″E
- Type: Prison Museum
- Owner: Stiftung Ettersberg
- Public transit access: Tram lines 3, 4 and 6; Bus line 90.; Stop: Domplatz (Cathedral Square)
- Website: stiftung-ettersberg.de

The Memorial and Education Centre Andreasstraße (German: Gedenk- und Bildungsstätte Andreasstraße), is a museum in Erfurt, Germany, which is housed in a former prison used by the East German Ministry for State Security (Stasi). It is informally known as the Stasi Museum.

From 1952 until 1989, over 5000 political prisoners were held on remand and interrogated in the Andreasstraße prison, which was one of 17 Stasi remand prisons in the German Democratic Republic (East Germany). The museum was opened in 2013 as a memorial to repression and resistance in the Thuringia region during the GDR dictatorship. Its permanent exhibitions focus on the experiences of the prison's inmates, the activities of the Stasi, life under the dictatorship, and the Peaceful Revolution which led to German reunification.

On 4 December 1989, local citizens stormed and occupied the prison as well as the neighbouring Stasi district headquarters to stop the mass destruction of Stasi files. Some Stasi employees were thrown out of upper floor windows and beaten after falling to the streets below, but there were no deaths or serious injuries. It was the first of many occupations of Stasi premises throughout the country, and it was a milestone in the Peaceful Revolution. It led to the preservation and opening of Stasi files so that citizens could see what information was held on them and so that the crimes of the Stasi could be exposed.

The prison was opened in 1878 and held political prisoners for several different political regimes until 1989. It was closed in 2002.

The Memorial and Education Centre Andreasstrasse is managed by the Stiftung Ettersberg.

== The prison in the pre-GDR period ==
=== 1871–1933 ===
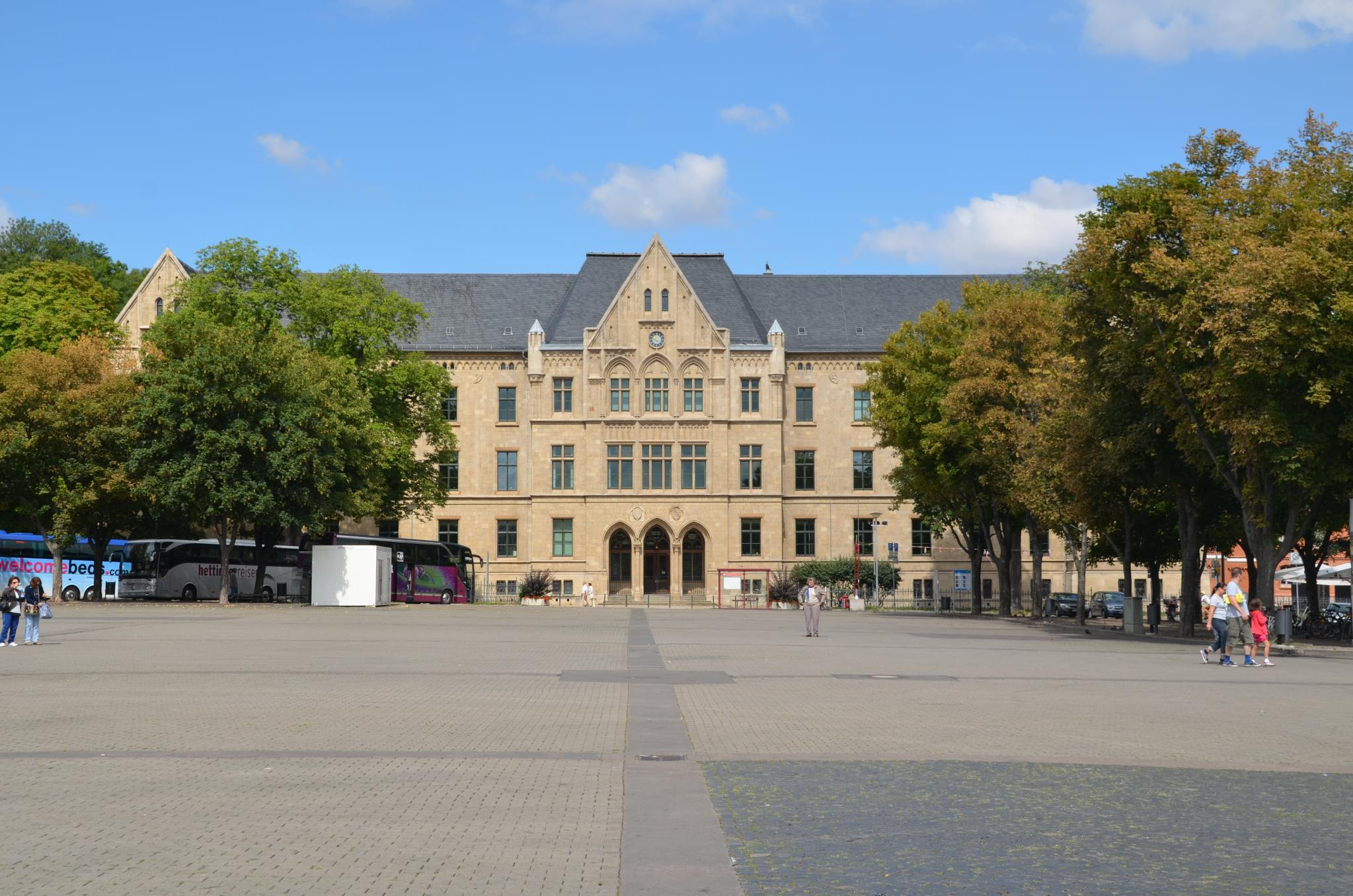
Courthouse, Erfurt, completed 1879, facing the Cathedral square

Shortly after German unification in 1871, a new courthouse and prison ensemble were planned, as the city had grown rapidly from a population of 16,000 in 1802 to 100,000. During the 19th century, prison had become the most important form of criminal punishment in Prussia, in preference to corporal punishment which had previously been favoured.

The new buildings were constructed on a park neighbouring Erfurt's Cathedral Square and below the town fortress, Petersberg Citadel. Building began in 1874; the three-storey, red-brick, neo-gothic prison came into use in October 1878. The stone-clad courthouse around the corner from it opened nine months later in 1879.

The new prison initially accommodated 110 male and female inmates. It was further reconfigured and by 1911 the average occupancy was 198: 162 men in 34 cells and 36 women in 8 cells. It served as a remand prison for people awaiting trial and for holding those convicted of property offences, fraud and violent crime. People were also incarcerated on political charges such as Lèse-majesté and going on strike. Newspapers editors who published articles in favour of social democracy could also be imprisoned.

After World War I, during the Weimar Republic era, considerable renovation and modernisation work was carried out using prisoners' labour. By 1932 the average number of inmates was 253.

=== Nazi era 1933–1945 ===
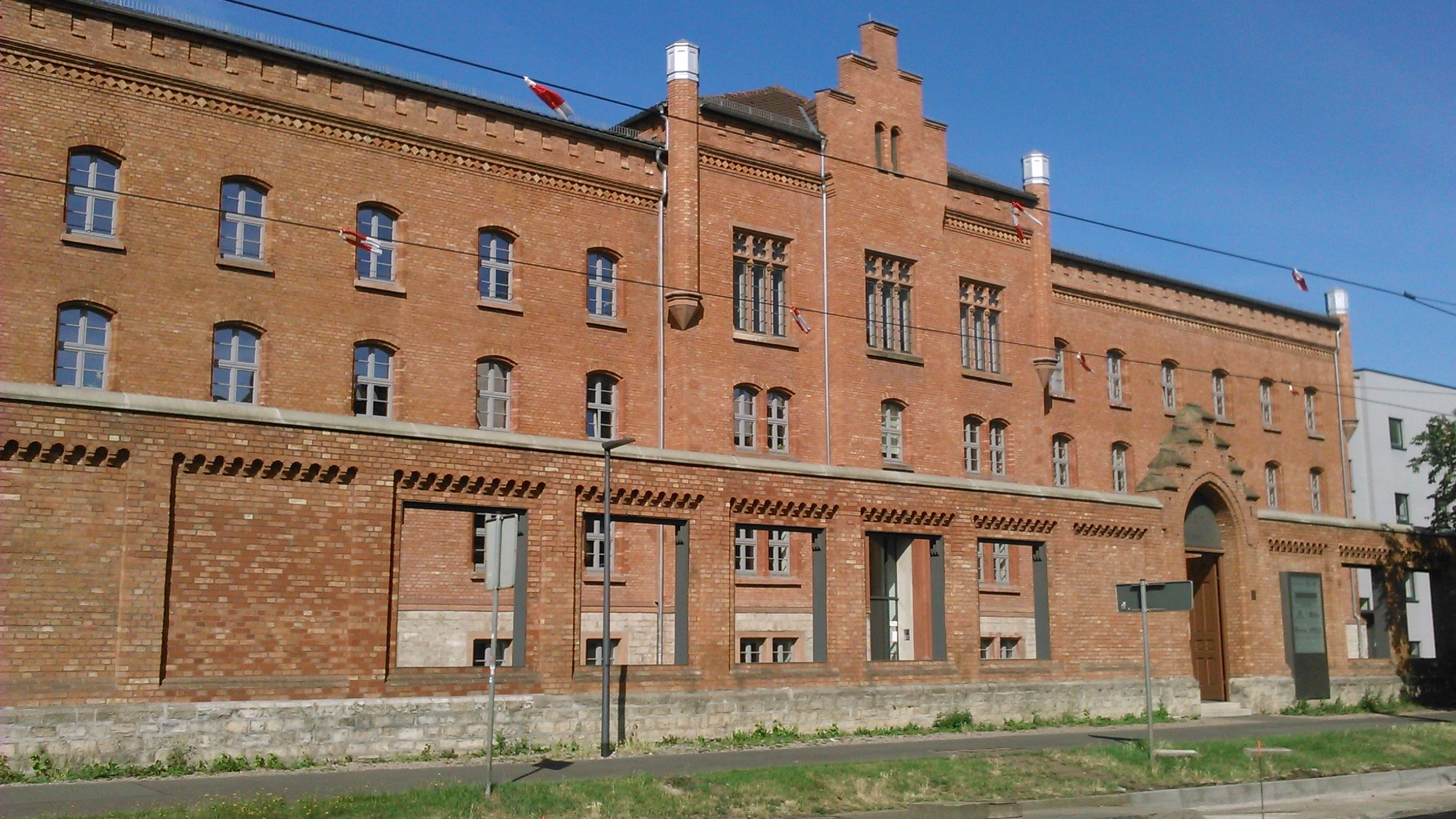
Andreasstraße 37, Erfurt. The former prison opened in 1878.

During the Nazi era there was widespread abuse of police powers. People could be arrested without reason and held in prison indefinitely; they were persecuted for their faith, sexual orientation and political beliefs. The Andreasstraße prison was used primarily to hold "Andersdenkende" (literally: "differently-thinkers") i.e. anyone who dissented from the views of the Nazi party. In 1939, at the start of World War II, the basement of the prison was altered so that it could be used as an air raid shelter. The prison became so overcrowded that political detainees were also held in a police detention centre at Petersberg Citadel, which is on a hill immediately behind Andreasstraße. That prison also became over-crowded. By 1943 the number of inmates in the Andreasstraße prison had grown to 350 and at the end of the war, in 1945, it held 400 prisoners.

=== Soviet occupation 1945–1949 ===
Erfurt was liberated by the US 80th Infantry Division on 12 April 1945. The American administration closed the Andreasstraße prison. Political prisoners were released and other inmates were transferred to other prisons in Thuringia. As had been agreed at the Yalta Conference, Thuringia was handed over to the Soviet military administration in the first week of July. It confiscated the prison building and used it for storage. Later it was used for the "preventative detention" of people with "unstable lifestyles", such as the homeless and alcoholics. Nazis and those suspected of anti-communist activities were interned in Special camp number 2 at the former Buchenwald concentration camp site. Under the Soviet administration many people who were convicted of political crimes were given the death penalty.

From 1948 the Andreasstraße prison was again used for holding for convicts and remand prisoners. It had 42 single and 36 shared cells; the number of people held fluctuated on a daily basis from 212 to 310.

== GDR era 1949–1990 ==
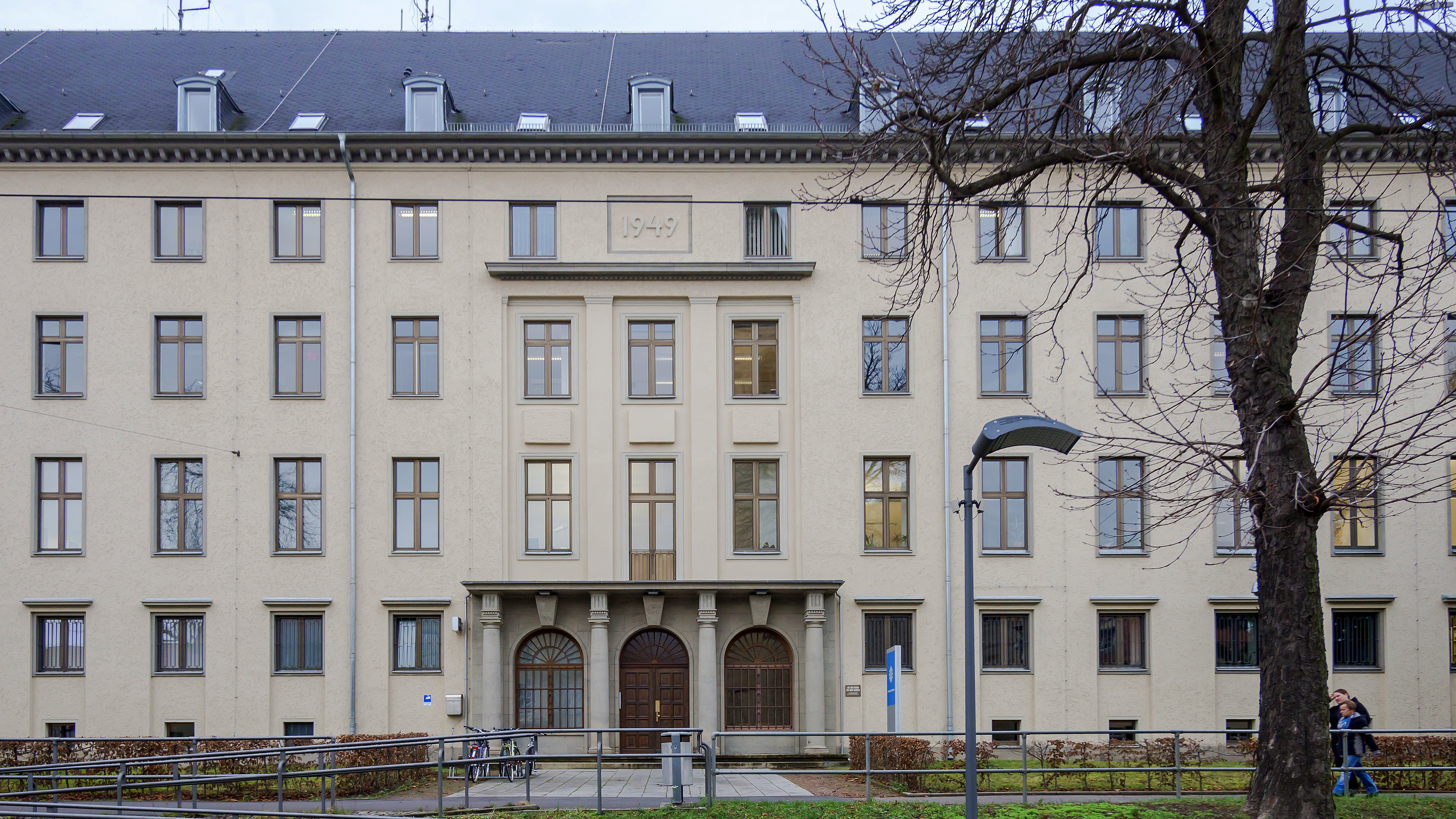
Andreasstraße 38, Erfurt, the former Stasi District Headquarters, now a police administration building

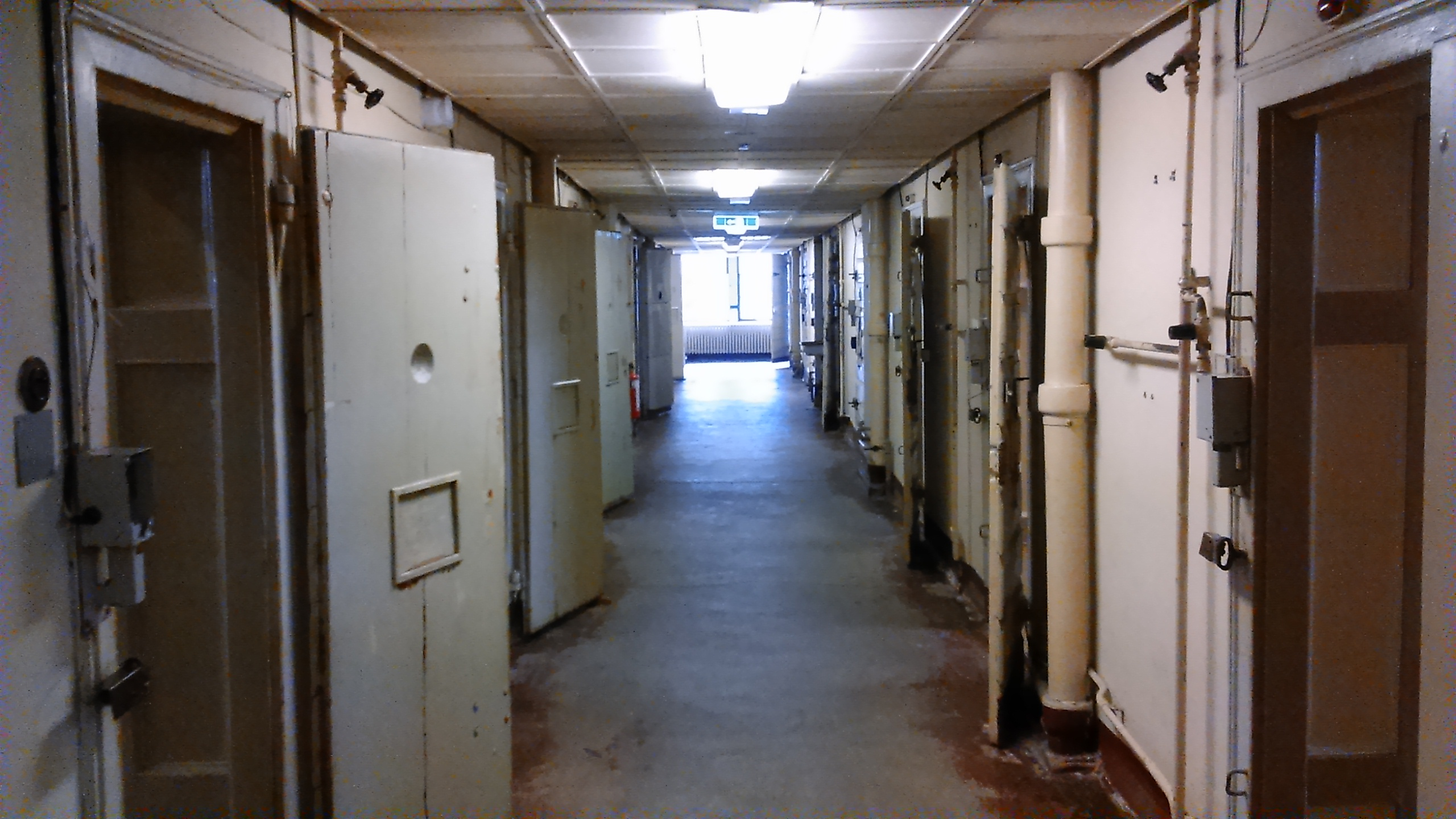
Corridor of the men's section, on the 2nd floor of the former Andreasstraße Prison

The German Democratic Republic was founded on 7 October 1949. The Landespolizei, the state police force, were put in charge of the Andreastraße prison. Most of the prisoners were being held for crimes such as theft, burglary, or "Arbeitsbummelei" (being lazy or careless at work).

The Ministry of State Security (Stasi) was established on 8 February 1950. It functioned as the country's secret police, intelligence agency and crime investigation service, all in one. It grew to have around 270,000 people working for it, including about 180,000 informers, or "unofficial collaborators".

The administration of the GDR was centralised in August 1952. The five former East German states were dissolved and the country was reorganised into districts (Bezirke). Thuringia was divided into three districts: Erfurt, Gera and Suhl. The separate state police forces were merged into the centralised Volkspolizei.

The Andreasstraße prison became a facility shared by the Volkspolizei and the Stasi; the Stasi's Erfurt district headquarters was set up at Andreasstraße 38, neighbouring the prison. The Volkspolizei used the basement and ground floor of the prison and the first and second floors were used by the Stasi for holding and interrogating remand prisoners. About 90% of all arrests by the Stasi were on political grounds. Women were held on the first floor and men on the second floor. The Stasi floors were set up to hold a maximum of 96 detainees; by 1962 there were 121, and by 1989, the year the Berlin wall was opened, there were over 300 inmates. The first director of the Stasi part of the prison was Lieutenant Willi Stettner, a former inmate of Buchenwald concentration camp.

Between 1952 and 1989 over 5000 political prisoners were held and interrogated in the Andreasstraße prison. It is not known precisely how many people were detained on political grounds in the whole of the GDR, but it is estimated that alone during the period when Erich Honecker was General Secretary of the Socialist Unity Party, May 1971 to October 1989, the number was around 35,000.

In October 1972, as part of the celebrations of the 23rd anniversary of the GDR's founding, Erich Honecker announced an amnesty for over 42,000 "political and criminal perpetrators". It was not a full amnesty, but those who had been convicted and were still in prison had their sentences commuted to three-years probation. This was the first time GDR had publicly acknowledged that it had political prisoners and it caused a sensation in the West. However, it had been known at government level much earlier than that. Political prisoners had been ransomed to the West German government since the early 1960s. According to the historian Andreas Apelt, "Between 1964 and 1989 some 33,755 political prisoners and 250,000 of their relatives were sold to West Germany, for a sum totalling 3.5bn Deutschmarks". The price paid varied but on average it was about 40,000 Deutsche Marks per person. It was a lucrative way for the East German government to get western currency.

On the 28 October 1989, to try to calm protests against the government, an amnesty was issued for those being held for border crimes or for participation in the weekly demonstrations that were happening all over the country.

After the fall of the Berlin Wall on 9 November 1989, the Ministry for State Security was renamed the "Office for National Security" (German: Amt für Nationale Sicherheit) on 17 November 1989. It was dissolved on 13 January 1990. Its records are managed by the Stasi Records Agency.

On 6 December 1989, the Council of State issued an amnesty for all political prisoners. This is known as the "Gerlach Amnesty", after Manfred Gerlach, the last Head of State of East Germany.

After German reunification on 3 October 1990, the administration of the Federal Republic took over the prison. It closed in 2002.

=== Reasons for imprisonment ===
"Geklopft wurde meistens nachts vom Bett aus, was zur Folge hatte, dass der raue Putz voller Blutspuren war. [...] Es wurde ja das Alphabet durchgeklopft und das dauerte stundenlang. Die Knöchel waren blutig [...], aber es war die einzige Möglichkeit, Kontakt zu Leuten in den Nachbarzellen zu halten, und das war wichtig"

"[People] knocked [on the walls] mostly during the night from their beds, which resulted in the rough plaster [walls] being full of traces of blood. [...] The alphabet was tapped out for hours. Our knuckles were bloody [...], but that was the only way to keep in contact with people in the neighbouring cells, and that was important."

Thomas Wagner, in an interview on 31 August 2012. In November 1976, Wagner, then 22, was arrested for collecting signatures on a petition in support of exiled singer Wolf Biermann. He was held in Andresstraße prison until May 1977, after which he was sent to Cottbus prison to complete a 14 month sentence for "defamation of the State". He was ransomed to the West German government in November 1977, two months before the end of his sentence.

Charges included accusations of spying, sabotage, "political diversion", "underground activities" or "anti-democratic agitation". After the construction of the Berlin Wall in 1961, offences relating to trying to escape to the West became the main political crimes, especially in Thuringia which had the Inner German border on its western and southern perimeters. Examples of detention in Andreasstraße prison include:

- Johannes Hütcher, 20, who in 1960 shouted abuse and threw a plum jam sandwich at a photograph of Walter Ulbricht, the General Secretary of the Socialist Unity Party, which was hanging in his workplace staffroom. He was sentenced to 10 months imprisonment for "State-endangering propaganda and agitation".
- Rosel Schatz, 30, who in 1981 wrote love letters to her fiancé in West Germany which were intercepted by the Stasi. In one of these she told him she had applied for an "Ausreiseantrag" (a permit to leave East Germany). She was accused of "treasonous sharing of information" and sentenced to two years and three months imprisonment in Hoheneck women's prison. After a year she was ransomed to West Germany.
- The Höfelmayr family from Eisenach in Thuringia, tried to escape over the Czech border to Austria in 1983. The father received one year and 10 months, the mother one year and six months, the daughter, 17, one year and the son, 18, eight months.
- Marilene Bornemann, who during the East German uprising of 1953, with her husband Winfried distributed leaflets calling for free elections and a united Germany. In October 1953, Winfried Bornemann was sentenced to 10 years imprisonment, and Marilene to four years. While on remand in Andreasstraße she realised she was pregnant. She gave birth in a prison hospital at Meusdorf near Leipzig in June 1954 and was separated from her child for two years. She was held in the "Roter Ochse" prison in Halle until she was released in May 1956. Her husband was released in December 1960.
- In November 1976, the sing-songwriter Wolf Biermann was "ausgebürgert", i.e. stripped of his East German citizenship and banned from returning to the country, while he was in Cologne on an officially authorized tour of West Germany. Biermann was a critic of the government, but wanted to remain in the country to instigate change. After his exile, in 1976 and 1977 there were numerous arrests of people who supported him. In Erfurt, about 30 people who had signed a petition supporting Biermann were interrogated in Andreasstraße and sentenced from 1 year to 14 months imprisonment.
- Josef Blösche, a member of the SS and SD who is shown pointing a gun in the direction of a small boy in the iconic 1943 photograph Warsaw Ghetto boy, was arrested by the Stasi in 1967 and held in Andreasstraße prison in 1969 while he was on trial in Erfurt for Nazi war crimes. He was sentenced to death for crimes against humanity and executed in Leipzig. (Note: East Germany used the death penalty until 1981. It was carried out in the early period by guillotine, and later by a shot in the back of the neck, at execution facilities in Dresden and, from 1960 to 1981, in Leipzig. The exact number of people executed is not known because causes of death were sometimes falsified, but more than 160 people were executed in the GDR era; about a third of these were Nazi war criminals. The GDR formally abolished the death penalty in June 1987.)

=== Prison conditions ===
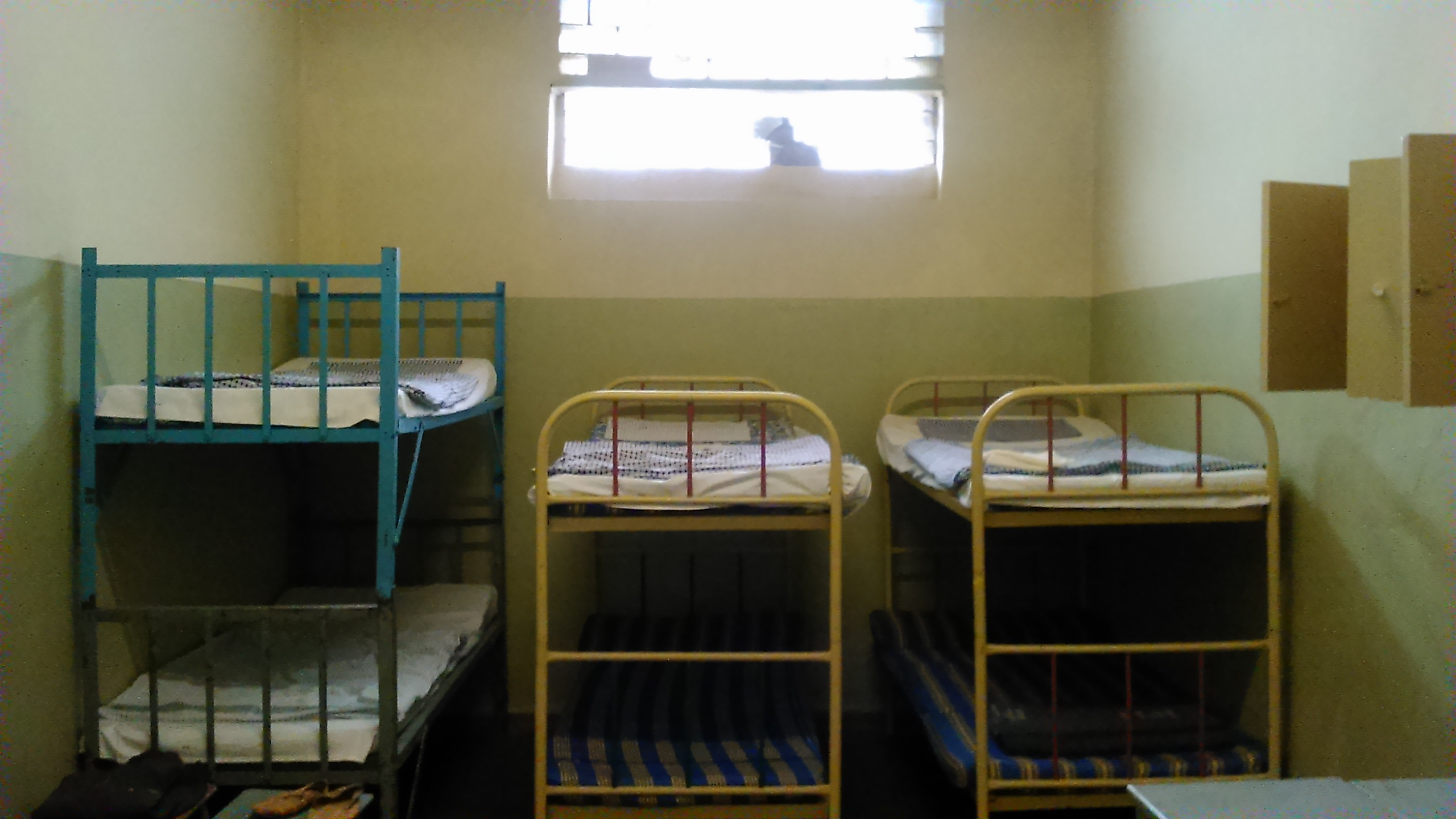
Shared men's cell, former Andreasstraße prison

People could be held on pre-trial detention for months. A three-month maximum limit for preliminary investigations was set in the criminal procedures code, but the unit that investigated political cases could extend investigations anytime it wished. The average detention period in the Andresstraße prison was 100 days; 64 days on average for the investigation, and if convicted, a further 36 days waiting to be transferred to one of several of prisons that held political convicts.

Physical and psychological abuse were common, particularly in the first half of the 1950s. Interrogations were carried out day and night, with sleep deprivation leading to false confessions being signed. Later, more subtle forms of mental pressure were used. Prisoners were impersonalised by being addressed only by their prison numbers, not by name. They were checked on frequently via spy holes in the cell doors, with lights turned on and off every 20 minutes during the night. The cells had glass brick windows, so that prisoners had no view of the outside.

The prisoners were only allowed out of their cells to go to interrogations and for a 30-minute per day visit to the exercise yard, which was divided up into separate, walled spaces. There was a system of "traffic lights" in the corridors, so that prisoners couldn't see or pass each other when they were being taken outside of their cells. Prisoners who were held in isolation cells developed an alphabetical code for knocking on the walls in order to communicate with each other. Prisoners could write four letters per month, which were checked by prison staff; they were not allowed to contain any comments about the criminal proceedings or prison conditions. One visitor per one month was allowed.

=== Occupation of the Stasi headquarters and prison ===
"Today, Roland Jahn, Federal Commissioner for the Stasi Records and a former dissident who was expelled from the GDR, says that the Erfurt occupation was the signal for a unified wave of occupations across the country [...] until the main Stasi headquarters in the Berlin district of Lichtenberg was occupied on January 15th. "That's how people turned the peaceful protest movement into a peaceful revolution," Jahn said.

For Jahn, the courageous women and men who carried out the occupations are the only reason that people can now search through the records about themselves which the Stasi had collected."

How ordinary people smashed the Stasi in The Local, 4 December 2014

In 1989 and 1990, there were widespread anti-government protests and strikes in towns and cities throughout East Germany, demanding the opening of the borders with the west, human rights protections and genuine democracy. This period, which led to the opening of the Berlin Wall on 9 November 1989 and German reunification on 3 October 1990, is known as the Peaceful Revolution. In Erfurt, from early October 1989 the protests usually took place every Thursday in Domplatz, the Cathedral square neighbouring the Andreasstraße prison. Amongst other slogans, protesters shouted "Stasi raus!" (Stasi Out!). Between 20,000 and 40,000 people attended the demonstrations in Domplatz. The largest demonstration in Erfurt, which had a population of 220,000, was on 3 November 1989 and had up to an estimated 100,000 participants.

Erich Honecker was removed as leader on 18 October 1989 and less than a month after the opening of the Berlin Wall, the entire SED party, which had ruled East Germany since it was founded, stepped down on 3 December. The Stasi's days seemed numbered and it was feared that they would destroy incriminating documents about their activities.

The political group New Forum, a nationwide collective of activist organizations, created a leaflet warning about Stasi attempts to destroy files. In Erfurt 4000 copies of the flyer were made and posted into letterboxes on the evening of 3 December. Early in the morning of 4 December, smoke was seen coming from the Stasi district headquarters at Andreasstraße 38, indicating that documents were being burned. Members of the women's group "Frauen für Veränderung" (Women for Change) went to the building and demanded to be let in. (Note: The writer and artist Gabriele Stötzer, who had been held in Andreasstraße and Hoheneck prisons in the 1970s for signing a petition supporting the exiled singer Wolf Biermann, was one of the "Women for Change" group.)

Ten people were let in at about 10 am. (Note: Other women from "Women for Change" also occupied the Stasi county office in "Straße der Einheit", outside of the city centre, from 12 pm on the same day.) A crowd gathered outside and many others then got into the building, walking past armed guards and pushing the Stasi staff out the way, who then locked themselves in their offices. The protesters set up a watch and checked any Stasi staff leaving the building to make sure they weren't trying to smuggle out any documents. More than 500 people gathered outside and vehicles were used to block the exits. Police who were present refused to help the Stasi employees.

The protesters went through the building looking for documents. They came across areas which were completely empty, but later found rooms full of shredded paper. In the basement they found a large incinerator, with sackfuls of files and letters ready to be burned, and the ashes of those that had already been destroyed.

The occupiers stored some of the material in detention cells in the basement of the building, and also occupied the empty second floor of Andreasstraße prison. Over the next few days files from the Erfurt district headquarters and other Stasi offices around the region were stored in cells in the empty men's section. The doors were sealed with large wax seals; some are now on display in the museum.

Late in the afternoon a "citizens' guard" and "citizens' committee" were established. The volunteer citizens' guard kept watch over the Stasi district headquarters building and the prison for months afterwards, making sure no documents were removed. Many former inmates of Andreasstraße prison arrived to guard the documents that were stored there. "They wanted to be eyewitnesses that the power of the Stasi was really over".

The action quickly inspired further occupations of Stasi offices throughout East Germany, starting that same evening in other towns in Thuringia as well as in Leipzig and Rostock. (Note: In Erfurt not only the Stasi district headquarters, county office and prison were occupied. In addition, on 4 December 1989 alone, citizens went to 37 "conspiratorial apartments", looking for Stasi documents to protect from destruction. These were apartments distributed throughout the city which were used by the Stasi to conduct their covert activities. There were known to be several hundred such apartments in Erfurt. Over the days that followed the first occupation, more and more of them were sought out by the protesters.)

The occupations led to the protection of Stasi files and ended the fear East German citizens had of the Stasi, the last bastion of the SED dictatorship. The Stasi was dissolved on 13 January 1990.

In 2013, five of the "Women for Change" were awarded the City of Erfurt's medal of honour for their courage in leading the occupation.

== Establishment of the Memorial and Education Centre ==
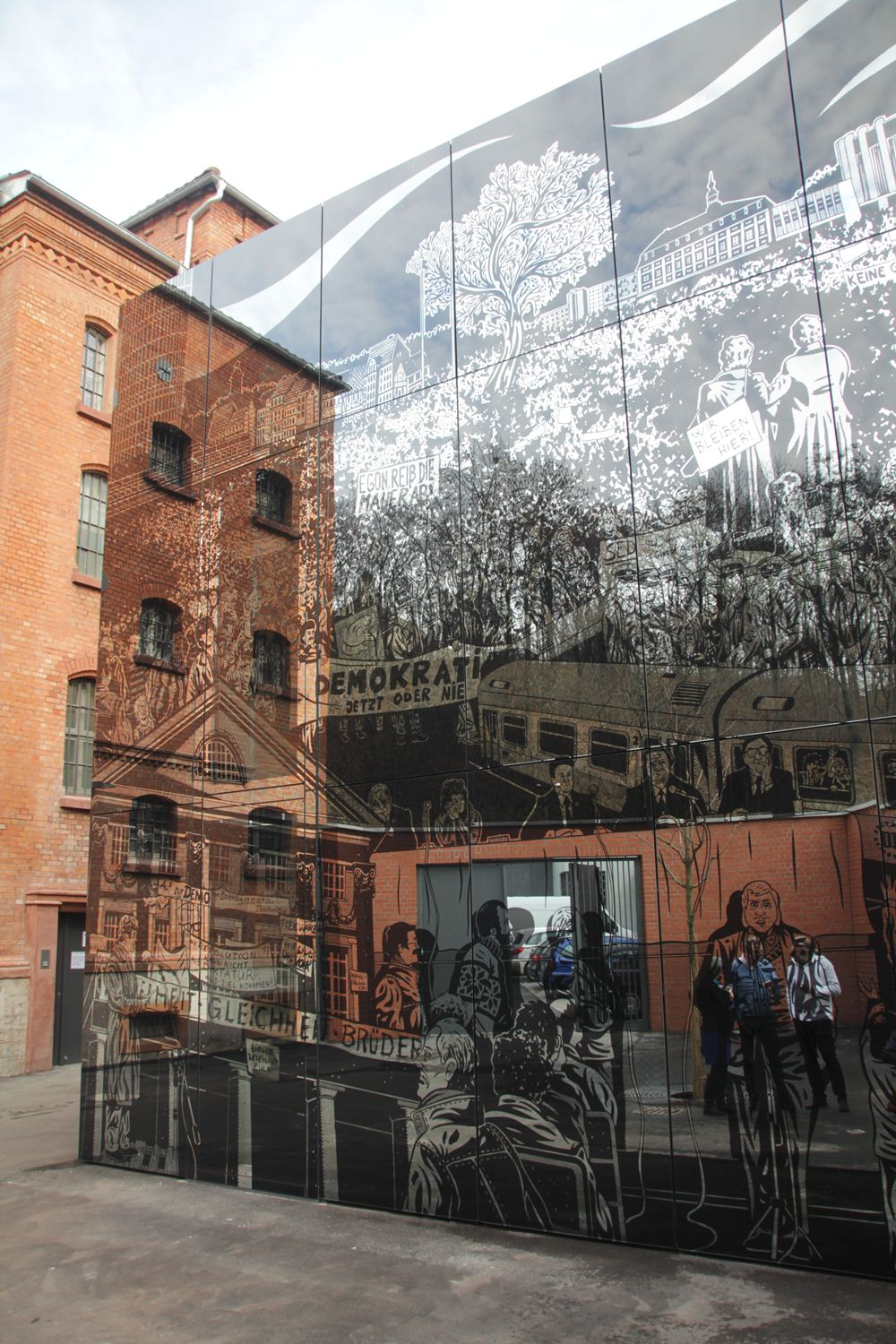
The "Kubus", a glass box on which the story of the protests and the occupation of Stasi premises in Erfurt is told in comic book style

After German reunification the building was used as a men's prison until 22 January 2002. The remaining 170 inmates were transferred to a new prison in Thuringia. The former men's section on the second floor was not used after 1989 and it remained preserved as it was in the GDR period.

From 2002, the condition of the empty building deteriorated while the state government decided what to do with it. From 2005 exhibitions on the history of the site were set up in the former prison, and from 2006 tours of the site were given, mainly by former inmates.

On New Year's Eve 2010, three former inmates occupied the building and began a hunger strike. They felt that their views were not being taken into account in the government's plans for the development of the memorial site. On 18 March 2010 it was agreed by various interested parties that "contemporary witnesses" to the events would be central to the project, and this was confirmed with the Thuringia Ministry of Culture on 26 March.

The prison was transferred to the Stiftung Ettersberg at the end of 2011 and plans were developed for the memorial centre, aiming to preserve the authenticity of the original site, but also to create a modern museum. Participants in the 1989 protests, former prison inmates, and former Stasi staff were all involved.

The "Kubus der Friedlichen Revolution" ("Cube of the Peaceful Revolution") was built in the courtyard. This is a 7.5-metre (25 ft) high glass cube, on which the story of the protest movement in Thuringia and the occupation of the prison and Stasi headquarters is told in the style of a graphic novel. The 40-metre-long (130 ft) mural, created by the artist Simon Schwartz wraps around the cube. Schwartz used over 100 contemporaneous photographs as a basis for his drawings.

The Memorial and Education Centre opened to the public on 4 December 2013, the anniversary of the citizens' occupation of the Erfurt Stasi headquarters and the prison.

The redevelopment of the prison received a special recognition award at the 2014 Thuringia State Prize for Architecture and Urban Planning.

== See also ==
- Berlin-Hohenschönhausen Memorial
- DDR Museum
- Stasi Museum (Berlin)

== Bibliography ==
- Childs, David (2014). The Fall of the GDR. Abingdon: Routledge. ISBN 978-1-3158-4051-2.
- Childs, David; Popplewell, Richard (2016). Stasi: The East German Intelligence and Security Service. Berlin: Springer. ISBN 978-0-333-77207-2.
- Guenther, Katja M. (2010). "Building across the Border: Erfurt and Western German Feminism". In Van Dyke, Nella; McCammon, Holly J. (eds.). Strategic Alliances: Coalition Building and Social Movements. Minneapolis: University Of Minnesota Press. ISBN 978-0-8166-6734-5.
- Hoffmeister, Hans; Hemple, Mirko, eds. (2000). Die Wende in Thüringen: ein Rückblick (2nd ed.). Arnstadt / Weimar: Thüringische Landeszeitung / Rhino Verlag.
- Horakova, Anna (2018). "Learning from the Underground: Christa Wolf and the Fourth Generation of GDR writers". In Klocke, Sonja E.; Hosek, Jennifer R. (eds.). Christa Wolf: A Companion. Berlin: De Gruyter. ISBN 978-3-11-049600-0.
- Kaule, Martin; Wolle, Stefan (2018). 100 Orte der DDR-Geschichte. Berlin: Ch. Links Verlag. ISBN 978-3-96289-000-1.
- Kermarrec, Philippe (2003). Der 17. Juni 1953 im Bezirk Erfurt. Erfurt: Verein für die Geschichte und Altertumskunde von Erfurt e.V. ISBN 3-9807188-6-7.
- Mählert, Ulrich (2019). Von der Friedlichen Revolution zur deutschen Einheit / From Peaceful Revolution to German Unity (in English and German). Berlin: Jaron Verlag. ISBN 978-3-89773-864-5.
- Maser, Peter; Veen, Hans-Joachim, eds. (2015). Haft, Diktatur, Revolution - Thüringen 1949-1989. Das Buch zur Gedenk- und Bildungsstätte Andreasstraße Erfurt. Weimar / Erfurt: Stiftung Ettersberg. ISBN 978-3-943098-13-6.
- Neubert, Ehrhart; Auerbach, Thomas (2005). "Es kann anders werden": Opposition und Widerstand in Thüringen 1945-1989. Köln / Weimar / Wien: Böhlau Verlag. ISBN 3-412-08804-8.
- Raßloff, Steffen (2016) [2009]. Friedliche Revolution und Landesgründung in Thüringen 1989/90 (6th ed.). Erfurt: Schriften der Landeszentrale für politische Bildung Thüringen. ISBN 978-3-943588-84-2.
- Raßloff, Steffen (2013). 100 Denkmale in Erfurt: Geschichte und Geschichten. Essen: Klartext. ISBN 978-3-8375-0987-8.
- Stanton, Shelby (2006). World War II Order of Battle: An Encyclopedic Reference to U.S. Army Ground Forces from Battalion through Division, 1939–1946 (Revised ed.). Mechanicsburg, Pennsylvania: Stackpole Books. ISBN 978-0-811701-57-0.
- Verein der Freunde der Citadelle Petersberg zu Erfurt e.V. (2015). 350 Jahre Zitadelle Petersberg. Tagungsband: Wissenschaftliches Kolloquim zum 350. Jahrestages der Grundsteinlegung der Zitadelle Petersberg vom 29. Mai bis 31 Mai 2015. Universität Erfurt. Erfurt: Freunde der Citadelle Petersberg zu Erfurt.e. V.
- Vilasi, Antonella Colonna (2015). The History of the Stasi. Bloomington, Indiana: AuthorHouse. ISBN 9781504937054.
- Voit, Jochen (2016). Gedenkstätte Andreasstraße: Haft, Diktatur und Revolution in Erfurt. Berlin: Ch. Links Verlag. ISBN 978-3-86153-885-1.
- Weinke, Annette (2018). Law, History, and Justice: Debating German State Crimes in the Long Twentieth Century. New York / Oxford: Berghahn Books. ISBN 978-1-7892-0105-5.
- Wüstenberg, Jenny (2017). Civil Society and Memory in Postwar Germany. Cambridge: Cambridge University Press. ISBN 978-1-1071-7746-8.
