= T-square (disambiguation) =

A T-square is a drafting and technical drawing tool.

T-square may also refer to:

- T-shaped square (tool), in carpentry
- T-square (fractal), in mathematics, a two-dimensional fractal
- T-Square (software), an early drafting software program
- T-Square (band), a Japanese jazz fusion band
- A variation of grand cross in astrology
- T-square position, a sexual position
- Tsquared (born 1987), professional Halo player

== See also ==
- "Square-T", the code for the WW2 USAF 490th Bombardment Group
- TT (disambiguation)
- 2T (disambiguation)
- T2 (disambiguation)
- Square (disambiguation)
- The Square (disambiguation)
