= Tourist Trophy =

Tourist Trophy may refer to:

- RAC Tourist Trophy for automobiles, since 1905 the longest awarded prize in motorsports
- Isle of Man TT, since 1907, the original motorcycle racing Tourist Trophy event, held as the British GP of MotoGP from 1949 to 1976
- Eifelrennen (German TT), since 1922, held until 1974 as a combined motorcycle/automobile event
- Dutch TT, a motorcycle race at Assen since 1925, currently held as the Dutch GP of MotoGP
- Australian Tourist Trophy
  - Australian Tourist Trophy, since 1956, an award for various domestic automobile racing series, with the eligible series having changed over the years
  - 1936 Australian Tourist Trophy, a one-off automobile race unrelated to the above
  - Australian Tourist Trophy (for motorcycles), a motorcycle race held on and off between 1914 and 1996
- Tourist Trophy (video game), a 2006 motorcycle game for the PlayStation 2
- Audi TT, a sports car named for IoM TT where motorcycles of Audi-related brands NSU and DKW had been successful

== See also ==
- TT (disambiguation)
- Grand Prix (disambiguation), a name sometimes used for competitions or sport events, alluding to the winner receiving a prize, trophy or honour
