= T3 =

T3 or T-3 may refer to:

== Entertainment ==
- T3: Alliance, an investigative-public affairs TV program in the Philippines
- T3 (magazine), focusing on new and hi-tech gadgets
- Terminator 3: Rise of the Machines, the third film in the Terminator series
- Tekken 3, a 1997 fighting game in the Tekken franchise
- Tiger 3, a 2023 Indian action thriller film in the YRF Spy Universe

== Places ==
- Fletcher's Ice Island or T-3, an iceberg and scientific research station
- T3 (skyscraper), an office building in Taichung, Taiwan
- Tokyo Teleport Town, a planned city on Odaiba, reclaimed land in Tokyo Bay

== Science, mathematics and technology ==
- T-3 tokamak, a record-breaking Soviet fusion experiment
- Axiom T3, or T3 space, regular space in topology and related fields of mathematics
- T3 Technion Technology Transfer, the technology transfer office of the Technion Israel Institute of Technology
- T3 line, or Digital Signal 3, a 44.736 Mbit/s telecommunications channel standard
- T-3, a Palomar–Leiden survey Jupiter Trojan subproject
- A tornado intensity rating on the TORRO scale

=== Devices ===
- SPARC T3, a CPU introduced by Sun Microsystems in 2010
- Tungsten T3, a palmOne handheld device
- Talking tactile tablet, a touch sensitive device for visually impaired people
- Canon EOS Rebel T3, a digital camera
- T3, a Hospedia bedside television
- Sony Xperia T3, an Android smartphone

=== Medicine ===
- T_{3}, in endocrinology, triiodothyronine, a thyroid hormone
- T3 spinal nerve
- Third thoracic vertebrae
- An electrode site in the 10–20 EEG system
- T_{3}, a tumor class in the TNM staging system

== Transportation ==
- Eastern Airways (IATA code)
- Île-de-France tramway Line 3, in Paris
- T3 Bankstown Line, a former rail service in Sydney, Australia
- T3 Liverpool & Inner West Line, a rail service in Sydney, Australia
- T3 transit lane, a type of high-occupancy vehicle lane in Australia
- T3 road (Tanzania)
- T3 road (Zambia)
- T3 road (Jamaica)
- T3 (Tram İzmir), a tram line in Turkey
- Heathrow Terminal 3
- Doomben line (numbered T3), a Queensland Rail service, Australia

=== Vehicles ===
- Fuji T-3, a Japanese primary military trainer aircraft
- LSWR T3 class, 4-4-0 steam locomotive
- NER Class T3, 0-8-0 steam locomotive
- T3, a model of the Oslo Metro OS T1000 train
- Tatra T3, a tramcar
- Trager-Bierens T-3 Alibi, a glider
- Volkswagen Type 2 (T3), the third generation of the Volkswagen Transporter van
- T3 tanker, a ship class
- T-3 Firefly, a former US Air Force training aircraft

== Other uses ==
- T3, a halogen light bulb form factor
- T3 (company), a woman-owned advertising agency in the US
- T3 (rapper) (active beginning in 1996), founding member of the band Slum Village
- T3, a privatisation offering of the company Telstra
- T3 (roller coaster), at Kentucky Kingdom
- Tikka T3, a Finnish bolt-action rifle series
- T+3, "trade date plus three days" in financial markets

== See also ==
- Polar T_{3} syndrome, low levels of that hormone in polar explorers
- 3T (disambiguation)
- TTT (disambiguation)
