= Stiftung Ettersberg =

German foundation

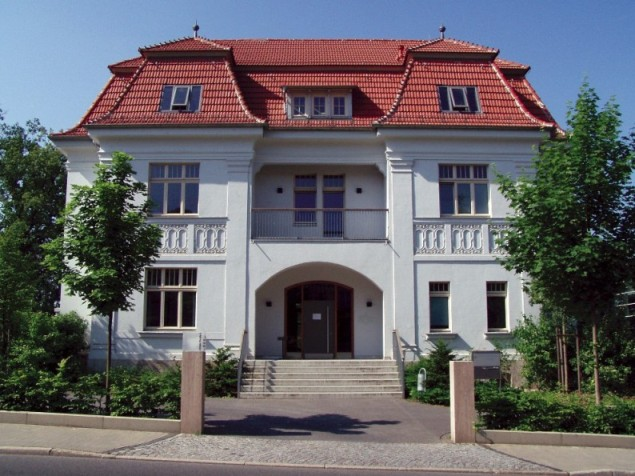
Stiftung Ettersberg

The Stiftung Ettersberg is legally established foundation, located in Weimar, Germany. Its mission is the comparative study of European dictatorships and their transition to democracy. The foundation administers the Memorial and Education Centre Andreasstrasse, a museum housed in the former Stasi prison in Erfurt.

== History ==
The idea for the creation of the Stiftung Ettersberg goes back to the Spanish writer and dramatist Jorge Semprún. As a former prisoner of Buchenwald Concentration Camp he suggested in 1994, on the occasion of the Friedenspreis des Deutschen Buchhandels award, to make use of the Ettersberg, on which Buchenwald Concentration Camp and afterwards the Soviet Special Camp No. 2 had been set up, as a point of reference symbolizing Germany’s double experience of dictatorship. He encouraged to take advantage of it with a European perspective in order to further the idea of democratic development in Central and Eastern Europe and of a European integration. The then minister-president of Thuringia, Dr Bernhard Vogel, took up this idea. On his initiative the Thuringian state government established the Stiftung Ettersberg, located in Weimar, in spring 2002 and the appointment of the executive board and the advisory council of the foundation.

== Mission ==
The foundation is devoted to the comparative study of European dictatorships in the 20th century as well as their democratic transition. Its object is to contribute to the historical coming to terms with and the comparative analysis of dictatorships of fascist, national socialist and communist provenance as well as authoritarian regimes; it is to elucidate their mechanisms of rule and their driving forces. Moreover, it is dedicated to reveal the significance of opposition and resistance against authoritarian and totalitarian suppression and it keeps alive the memory of the victims of dictatorial violence. Besides, it is concerned with the problems of “coping” with the past and questions of transition from dictatorship to democracy as well as the stability conditions of liberal democracies. Accordingly, it is the task of the Stiftung Ettersberg to prospectively pursue historical research which does not only perform work of memory but goes beyond this by making successive generations sensitive for the latent danger to freedom and democracy. The Stiftung Ettersberg attempts to foster the international and interdisciplinary dialogue between political scholars, historians, and researchers in the field of social and cultural studies in Europe. It endeavours to disseminate national experiences internationally and thereby to make a contribution to the stabilisation of liberal democracy throughout Europe. It also aims at being a platform of international encounters, reflection, remembrance, encouragement and last but not least of a critical analysis of contemporary developments.

From a European angle, the Stiftung Ettersberg organises international symposia, scientific conferences and colloquia, of which the results are issued in our own publication serial. In Thuringia, in the heart of Europe, the foundation promotes the dialogue between prolific university institutes, scientific and pedagogical institutions and other initiatives that operate in the field of dictatorship research and democratic transition processes. It organises exhibitions and initiates competitions for students on issues such as experience of dictatorship, stabilisation and endangering of democracy.

== Publication serial ==
The Stiftung Ettersberg publication serial is titled „European Dictatorships and their Overcoming“. Since 2003, there have been published 15 volumes at Boehlau publishing house:

- Volume 1: Hans-Joachim Veen (ed.): Nach der Diktatur. Demokratische Umbrüche in Europa – zwölf Jahre später (2003).
- Volume 2: Hans-Joachim Veen (ed.): Die abgeschnittene Revolution. Der 17. Juni 1953 in der deutschen Geschichte (2004).
- Volume 3: Ehrhart Neubert/Thomas Auerbach: „Es kann anders werden“. Opposition und Widerstand in Thüringen 1945–1989 (2005).
- Volume 4: Hans-Joachim Veen (ed.): Alte Eliten in jungen Demokratien? Wechsel, Wandel und Kontinuität in Mittel- und Osteuropa (2004).
- Volume 5: Henning Pietzsch: Jugend zwischen Kirche und Staat. Geschichte der kirchlichen Jugendarbeit in Jena 1970-1989 (2005).
- Volume 6: Volkhard Knigge/Ulrich Mählert (ed.): Der Kommunismus im Museum. Formen der Auseinandersetzung in Deutschland und Ostmitteleuropa (2005).
- Volume 8: Peter März/Hans-Joachim Veen (ed.): Woran erinnern? Der Kommunismus in der deutschen Erinnerungskultur (2006).
- Volume 9: Eva Ochs: „Heute kann ich das ja sagen“. Lagererfahrungen von Insassen sowjetischer Speziallager in der SBZ/DDR (2006).
- Volume 10: Michael Ploenus: „...so wichtig wie das tägliche Brot“. Das Jenaer Institut für Marxismus-Leninismus 1945-1990 (2007).
- Volume 11: Peter Wurschi: Rennsteigbeat. Jugendliche Subkulturen im Thüringer Raum 1952–1989 (2007).
- Volume 12: Hans-Joachim Veen/Ulrich Mählert/Peter März (ed.): Wechselwirkungen Ost–West. Dissidenz, Opposition und Zivilgesellschaft 1975 bis 1989 (2007).
- Volume 13: Hans-Joachim Veen/Ulrich Mählert/Franz-Josef Schlichting (ed.): Parteien in jungen Demokratien. Zwischen Fragilität und Stabilisierung in Ostmitteleuropa (2008).
- Volume 14: Hans-Joachim Veen/Peter März/Franz-Josef Schlichting (ed.): Kirche und Revolution. Das Christentum in Ostmitteleuropa vor und nach 1989 (2009).
- Volume 15: Hans-Joachim Veen/Peter März/Franz-Josef Schlichting (ed.): Die Folgen der Revolution. 20 Jahre nach dem Kommunismus Köln/Weimar/Wien (2010).
- Volume 16: Maciej Górny: "Die Wahrheit ist auf unserer Seite" Nation, Marxismus und Geschichte im Ostblock (2011).
- Volume 17: Volkhard Knigge/Hans-Joachim Veen/Ulrich Mählert/Franz-Josef Schlichting (ed.): Arbeit am europäischen Gedächtnis. Diktaturerfahrung und Demokratieentwicklung (2011)
- Volume 18: Hans-Joachim Veen (ed.): Zwischenbilanzen. Thüringen und seine Nachbarn nach 20 Jahren (2012)

== Touring exhibitions ==
The Stiftung Ettersberg presents four touring exhibitions in various German and European cities:

- "'Wo das Unrecht alltäglich ist, wird Widerstand zur Pflicht' - Opposition und Widerstand in der DDR" (“Where injustice is normal, resistance becomes an obligation" – opposition and resistance in the GDR with special regard to Thuringia)
- "Der Schrei nach Freiheit - Der 17. Juni 1953 in Thüringen" (Screaming for freedom - June 17, 1953 in Thuringia)
- "Die Rückkehr der Demokratie - Die demokratischen Revolutionen in Ostmitteleuropa 1989-91" (The Return of democracy: democratic revolutions in Eastern Central Europe, 1989–1991)
- "Polen und Deutsche gegen die kommunistische Diktatur" (Poles and Germans against communist dictatorship) (in cooperation with IPN Kraków)
