= Stasimuseum =

Museum in former Stasi headquarters

- Stasimuseum
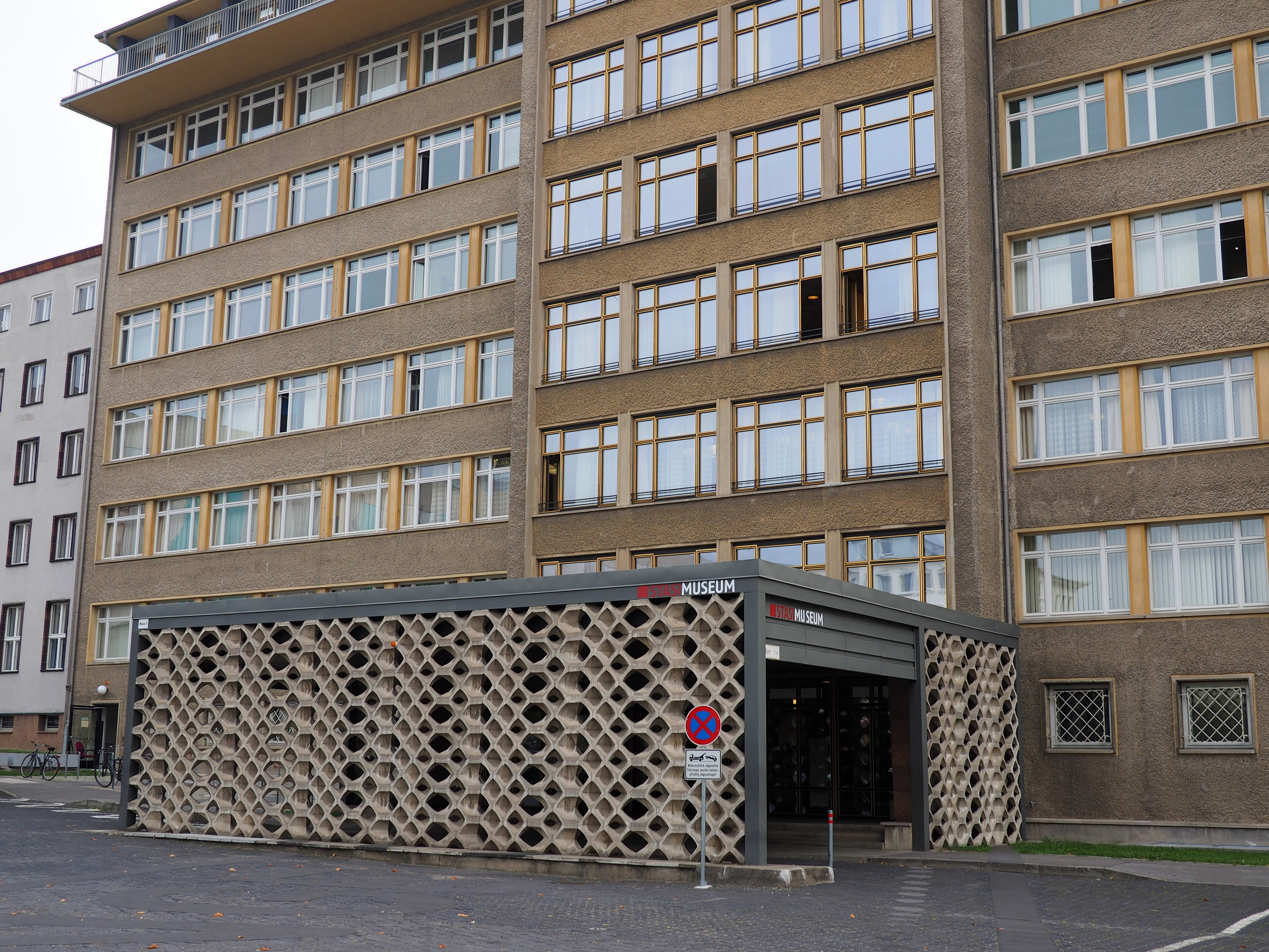
- The main entrance to the Stasimuseum
- Established: 1990
- Location: Germany
- Coordinates: 52°30′52″N 13°29′15″E
- Visitors: 100,000 in 2017
- Website: stasimuseum.de

The Stasimuseum (also known in German as the Forschungs- und Gedenkstätte Normannenstraße) is a research and memorial centre concerning the political system of the former East Germany. It is located in the Lichtenberg locality of Berlin, in the former headquarters of the Stasi (officially the Ministerium für Staatssicherheit), on Ruschestraße, near Frankfurter Allee and U-Bahn station Magdalenenstraße.

== History ==
The centrepiece of the exhibition is the office and working quarters of the former Minister of State Security – i.e. head of the Stasi – Erich Mielke. The museum is operated by the Antistalinistische Aktion Berlin-Normannenstraße (ASTAK), which was founded by civil rights activists in Berlin in 1990. It aims to foster the development of the museum as a "centre for the collection, preservation, documentation, rehabilitation and exhibition of evidence and research materials relating to East Germany".

In 2010 the German government announced its intention to take over the Stasimuseum, which led to a three-way dispute between ASTAK, local government in Lichtenberg, and the German national government over the future of the site. ASTAK subsequently announced that Building 1 of the Stasi headquarters, the museum's original location, would be reconstructed and renovated, and the museum would be temporarily moved to Building 22.

The museum has approximately 100,000 visitors per year.

== Gallery ==
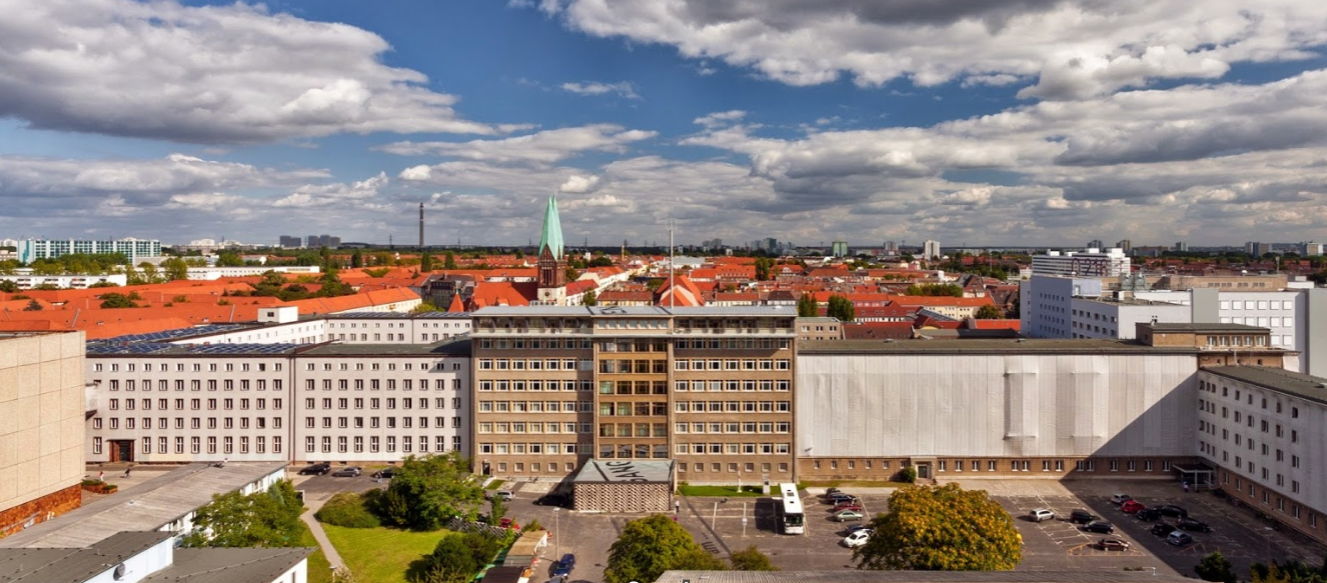

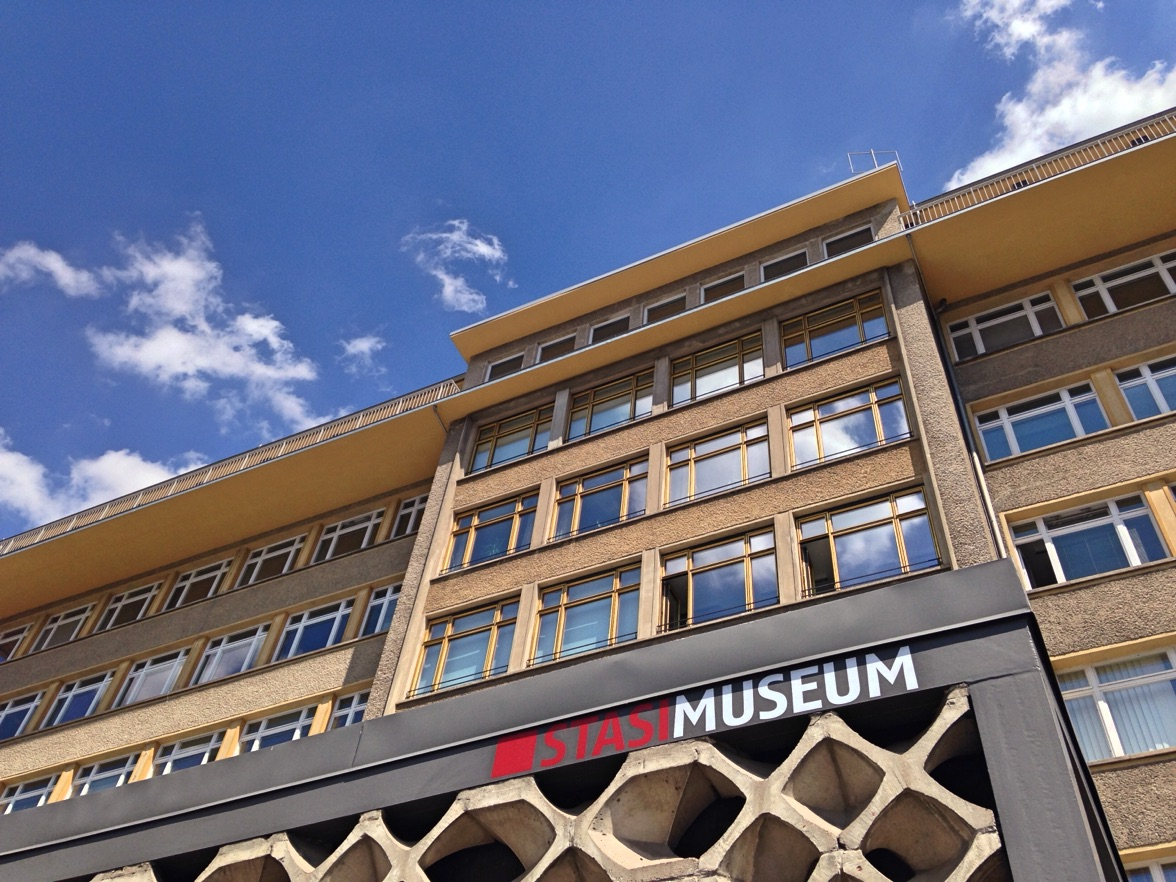

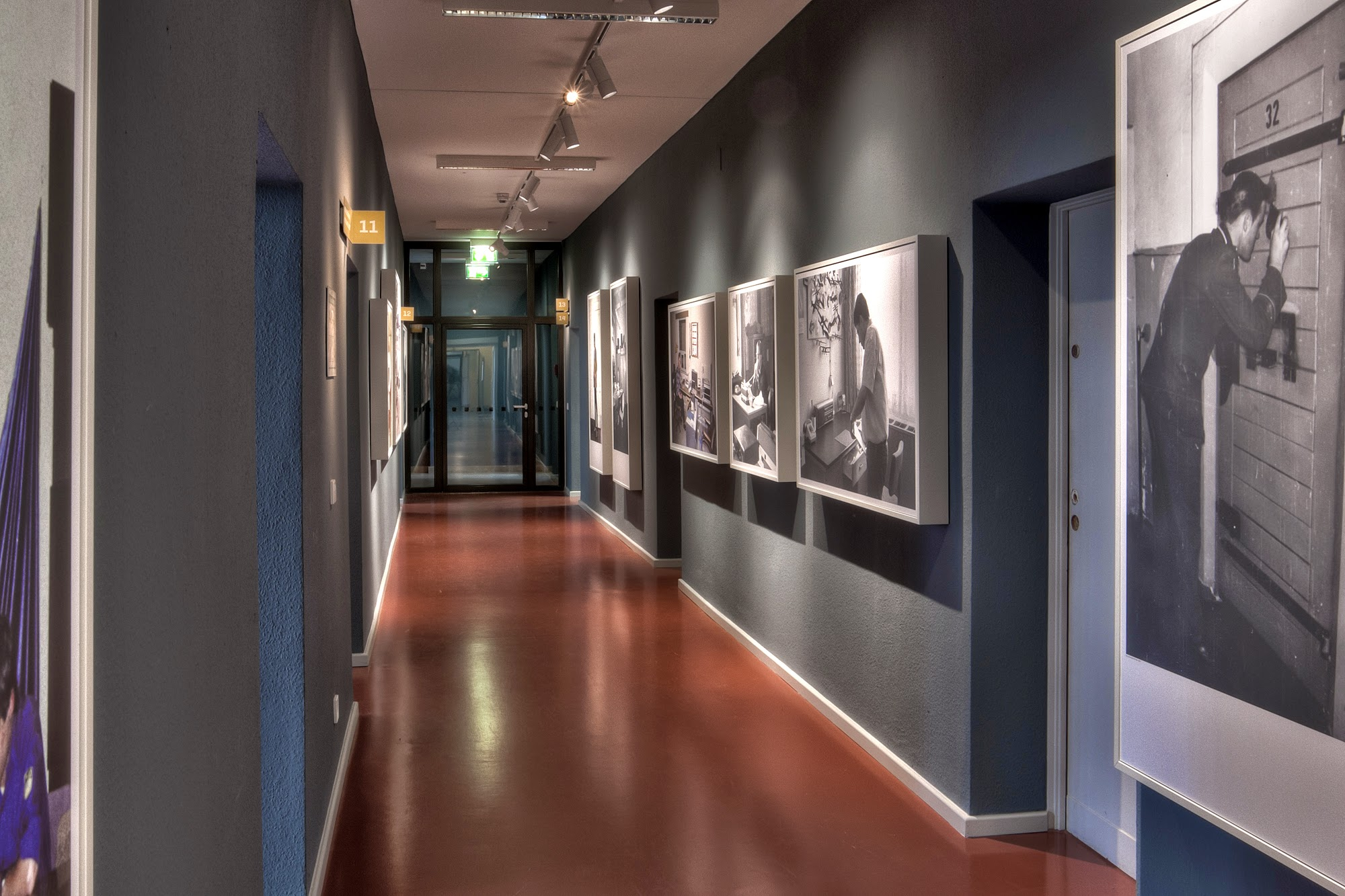

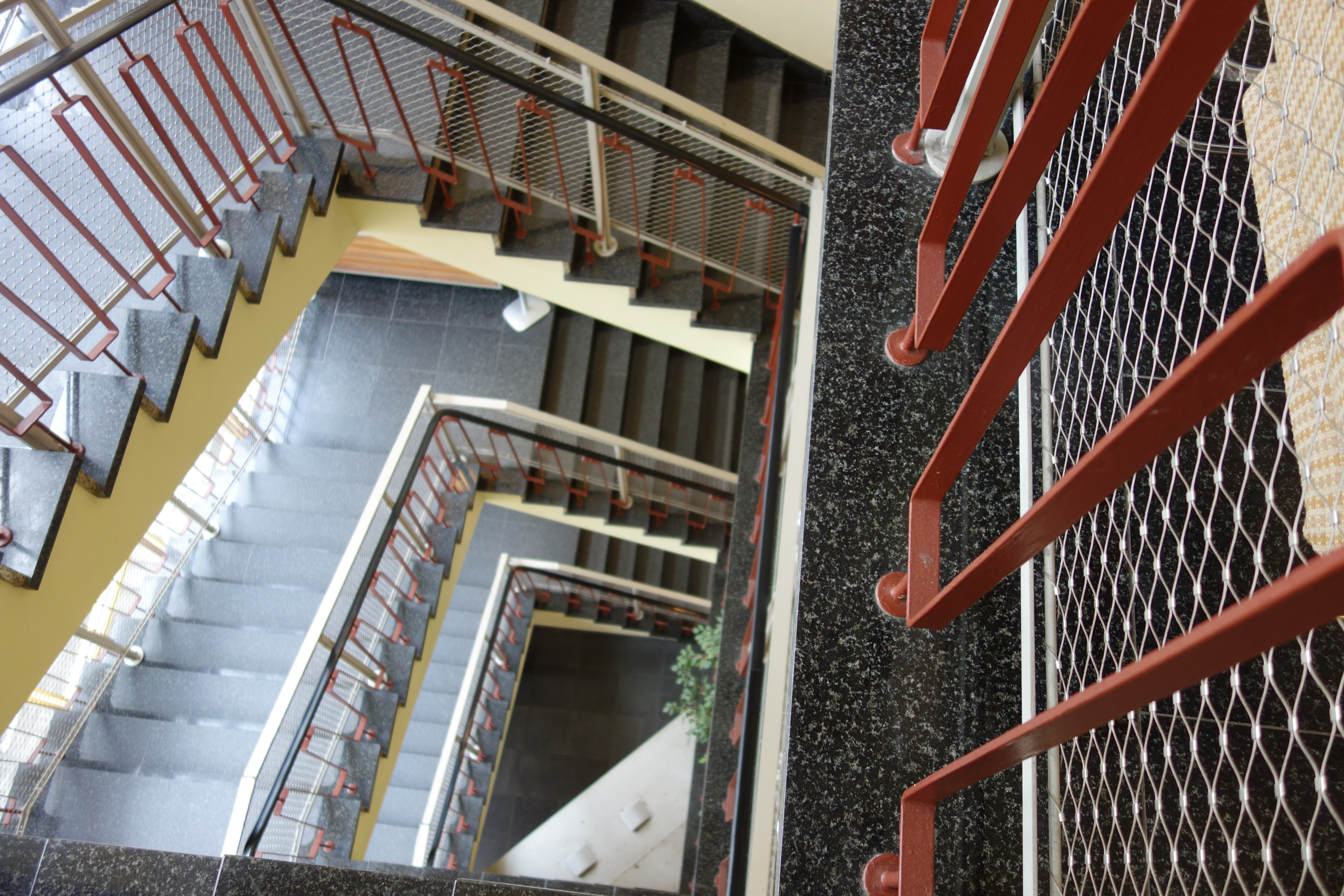

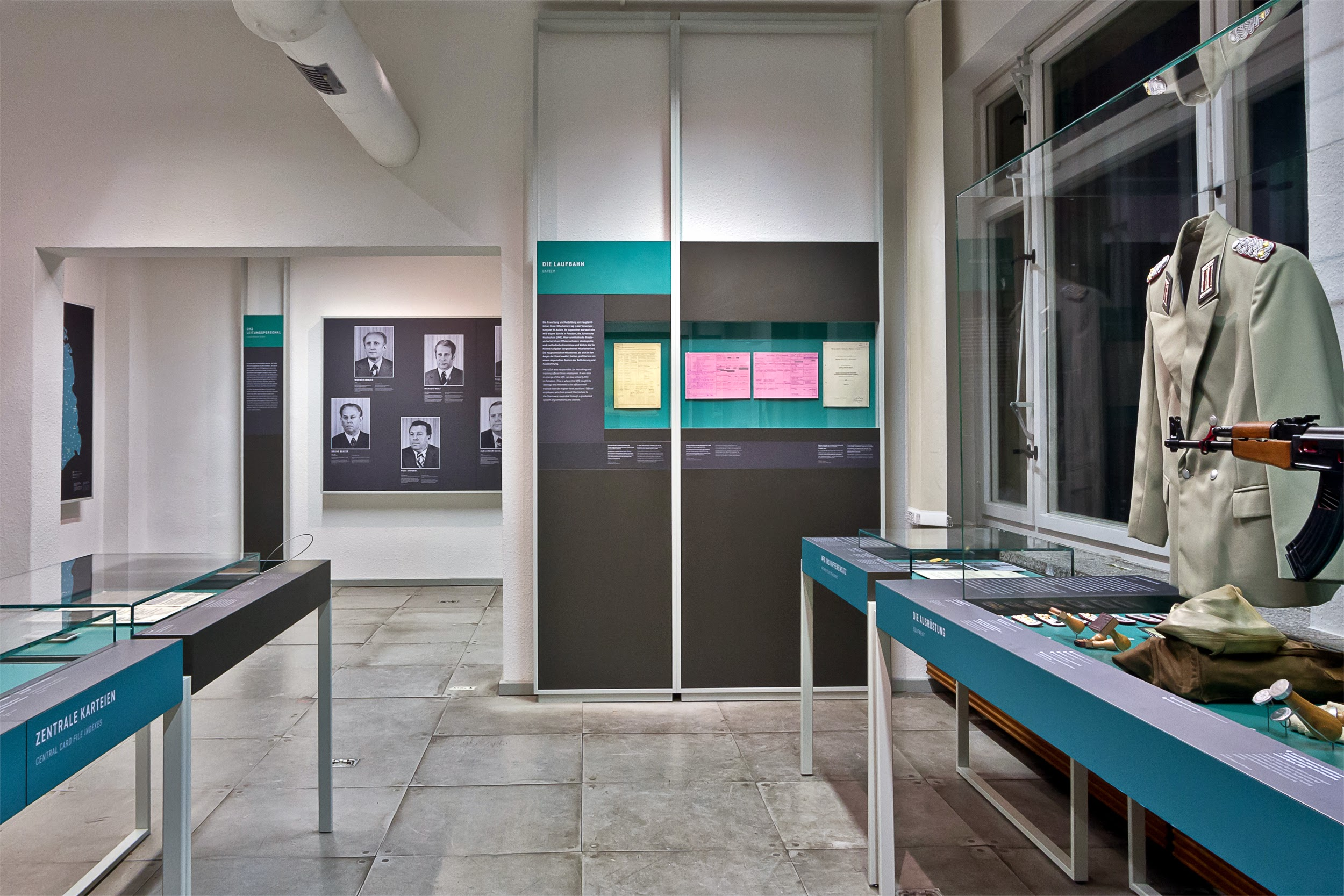

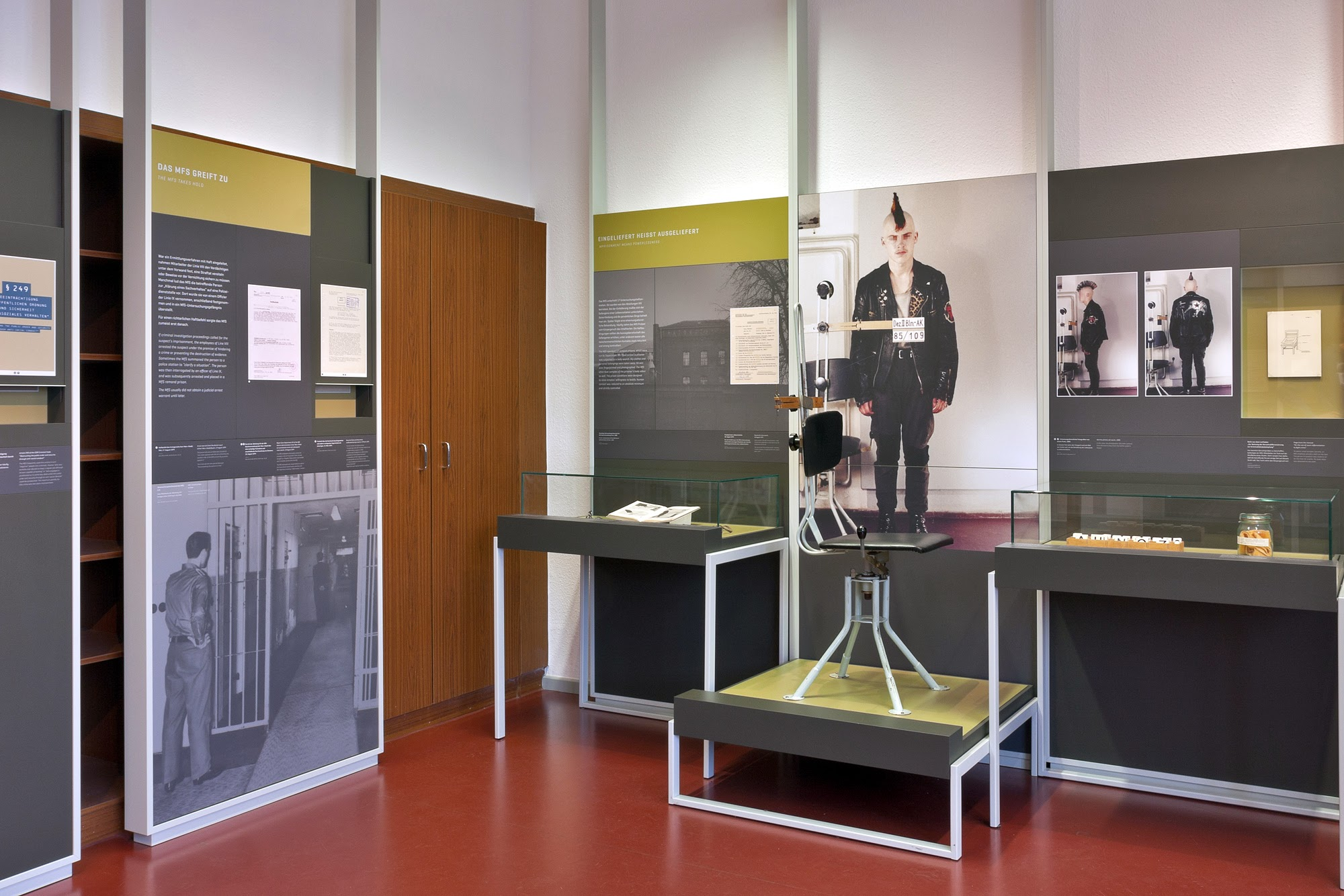

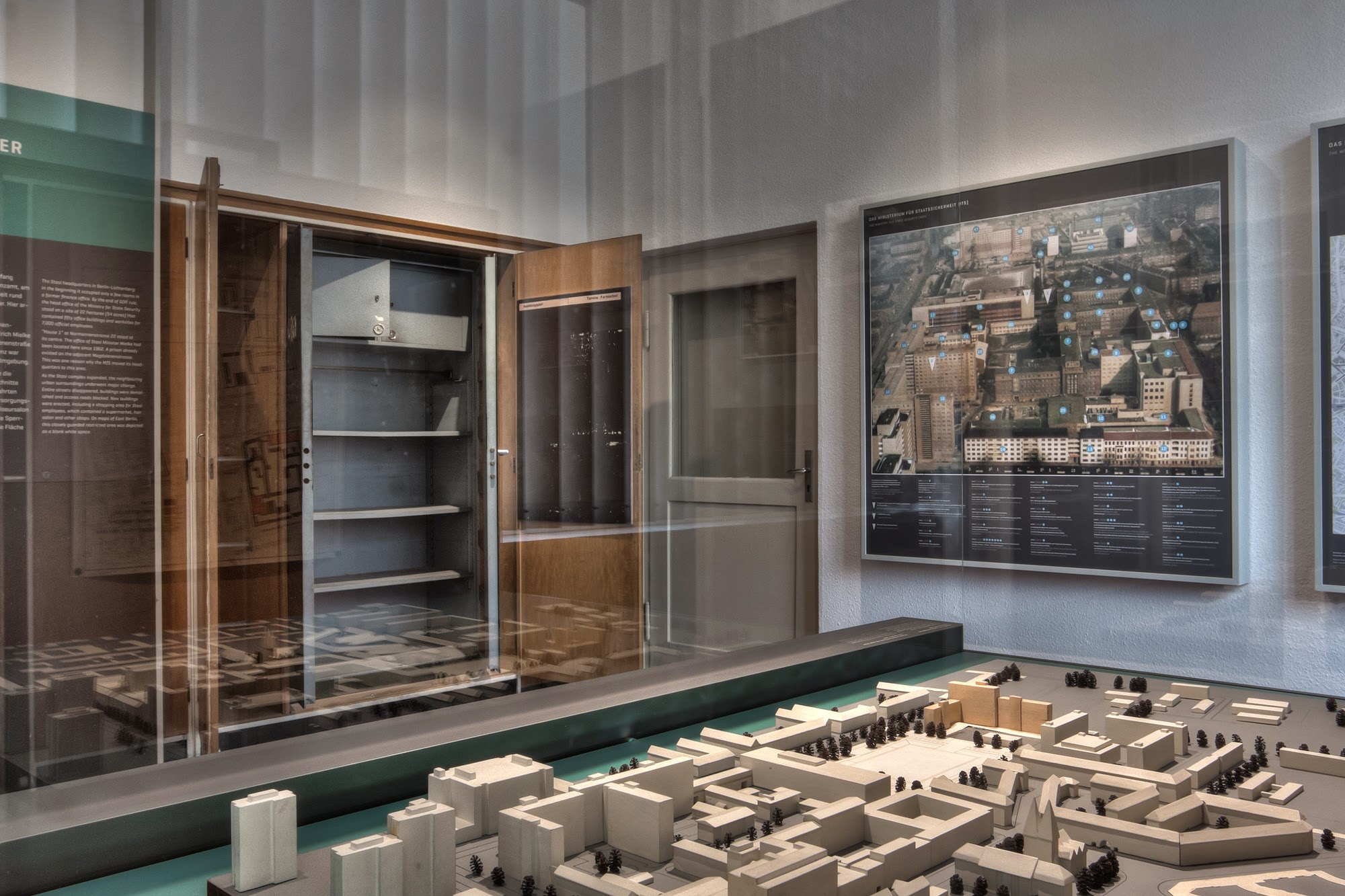

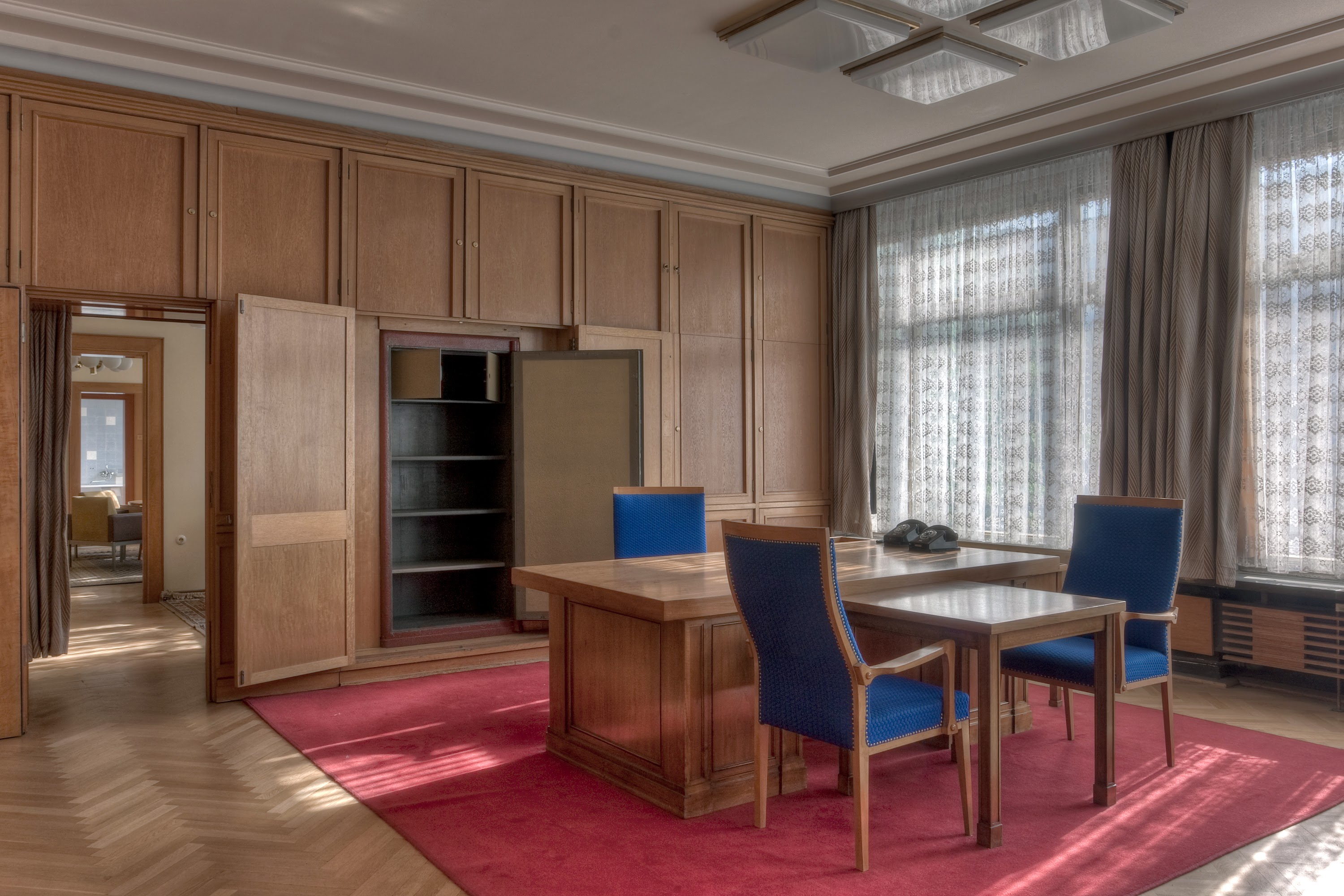

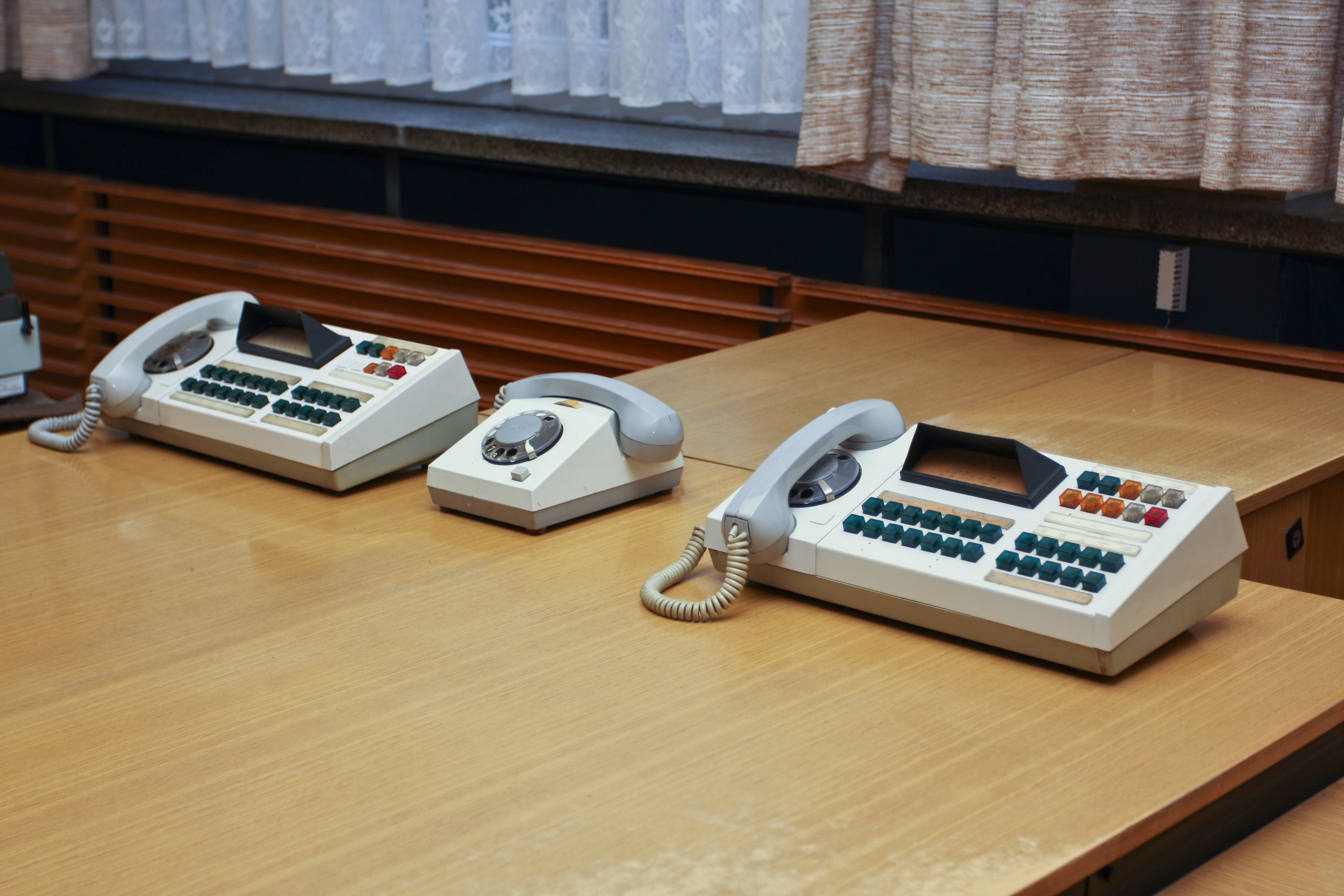

=== Erich Mielke's office ===
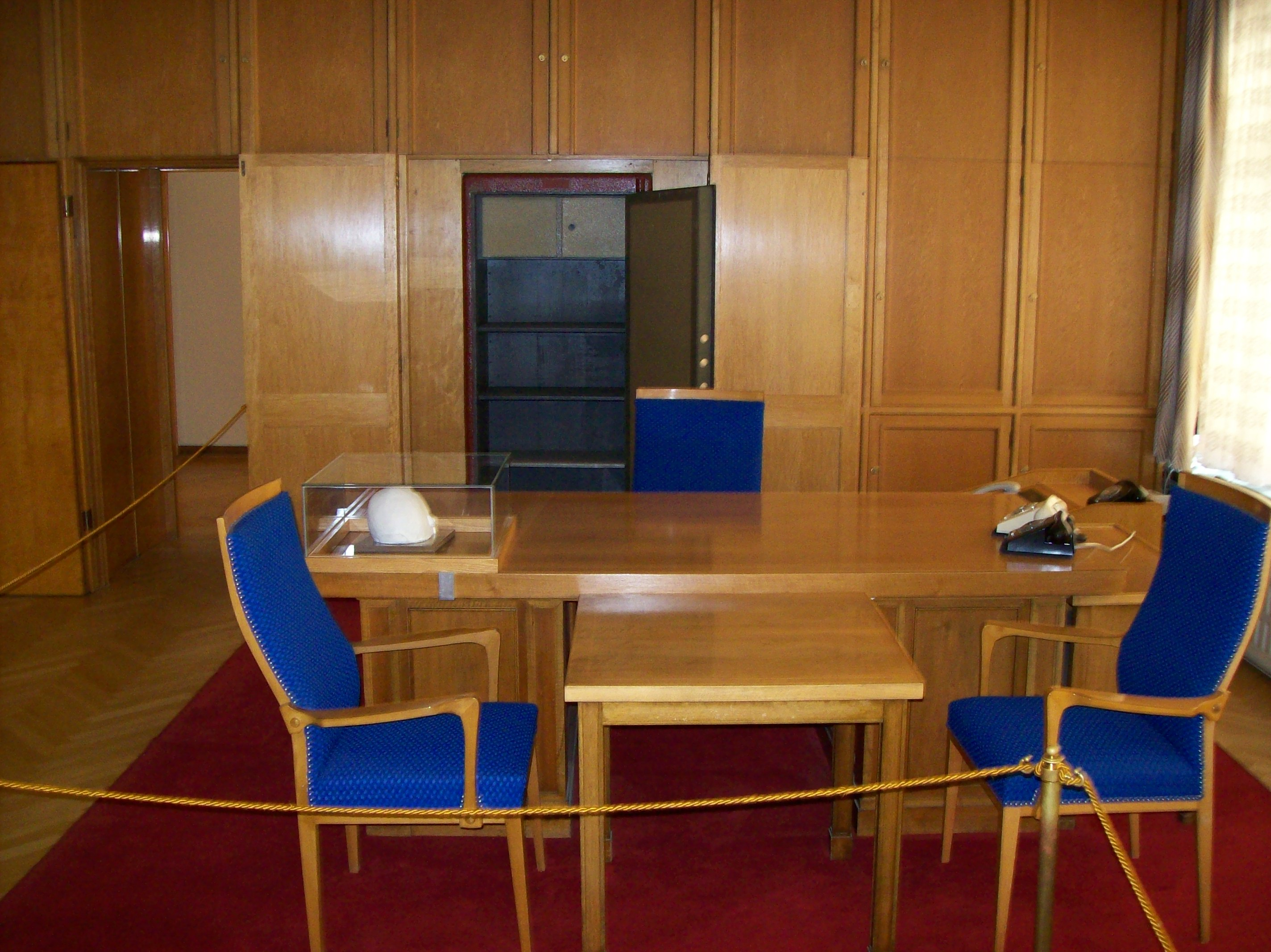

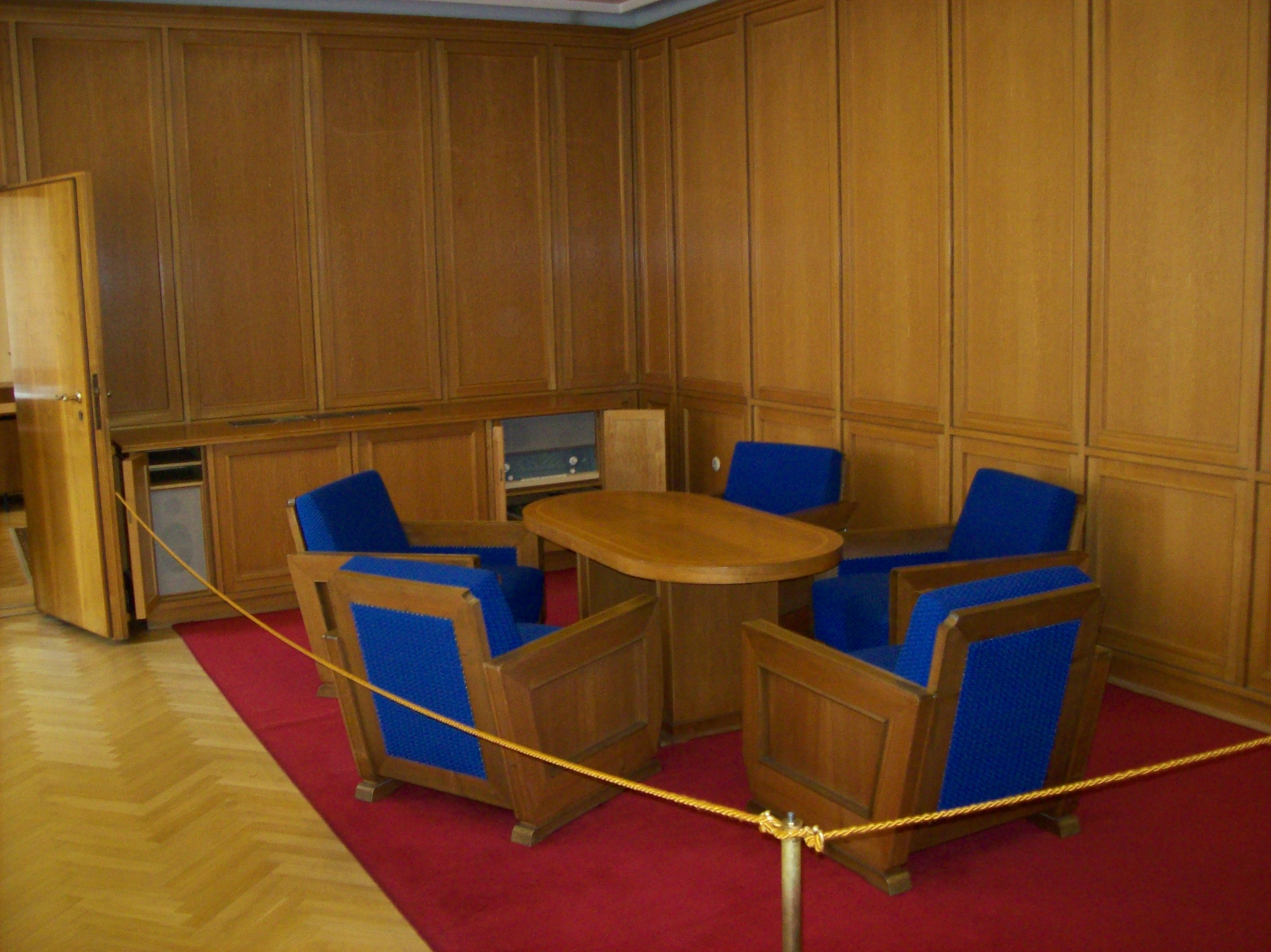

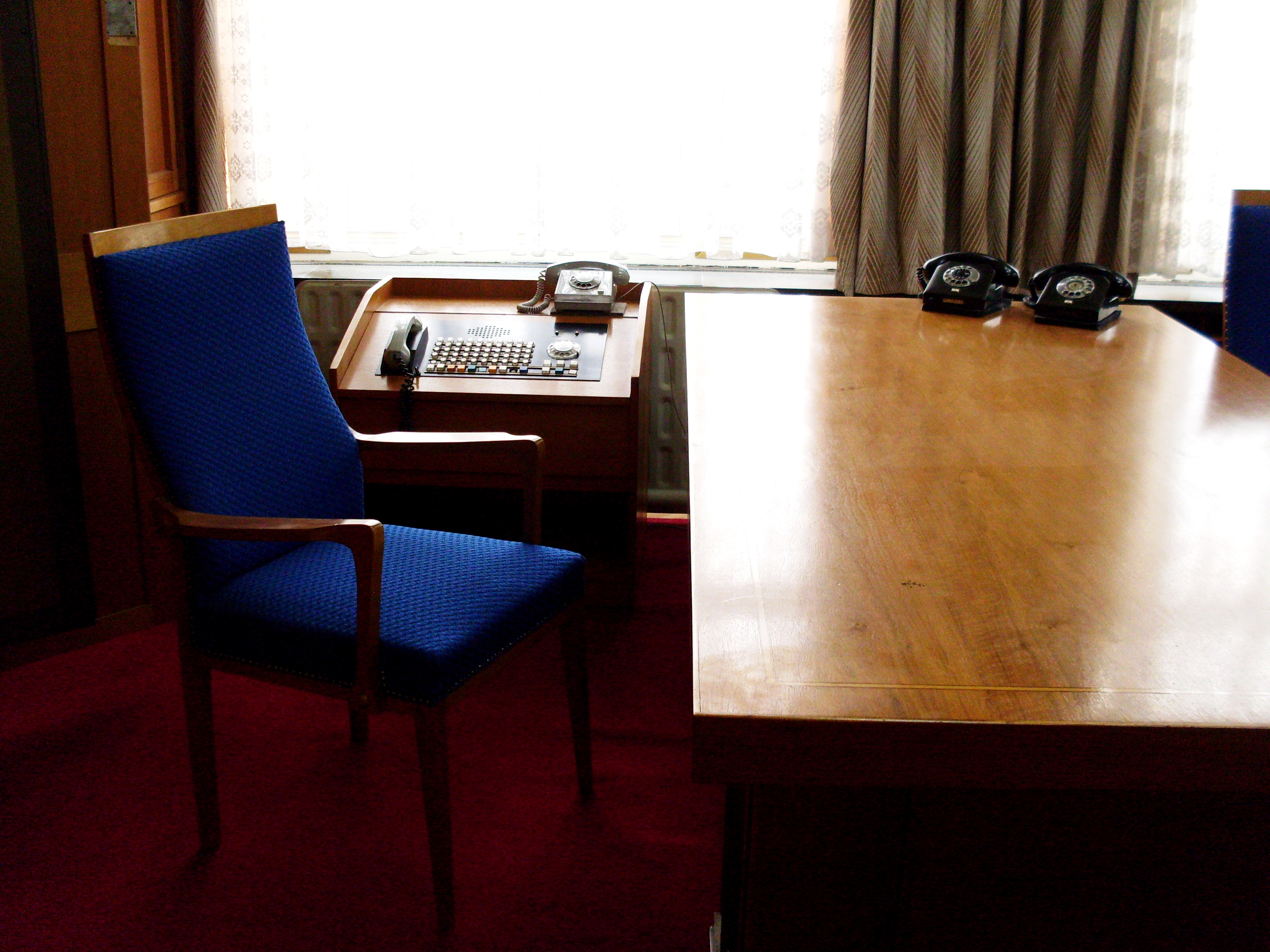

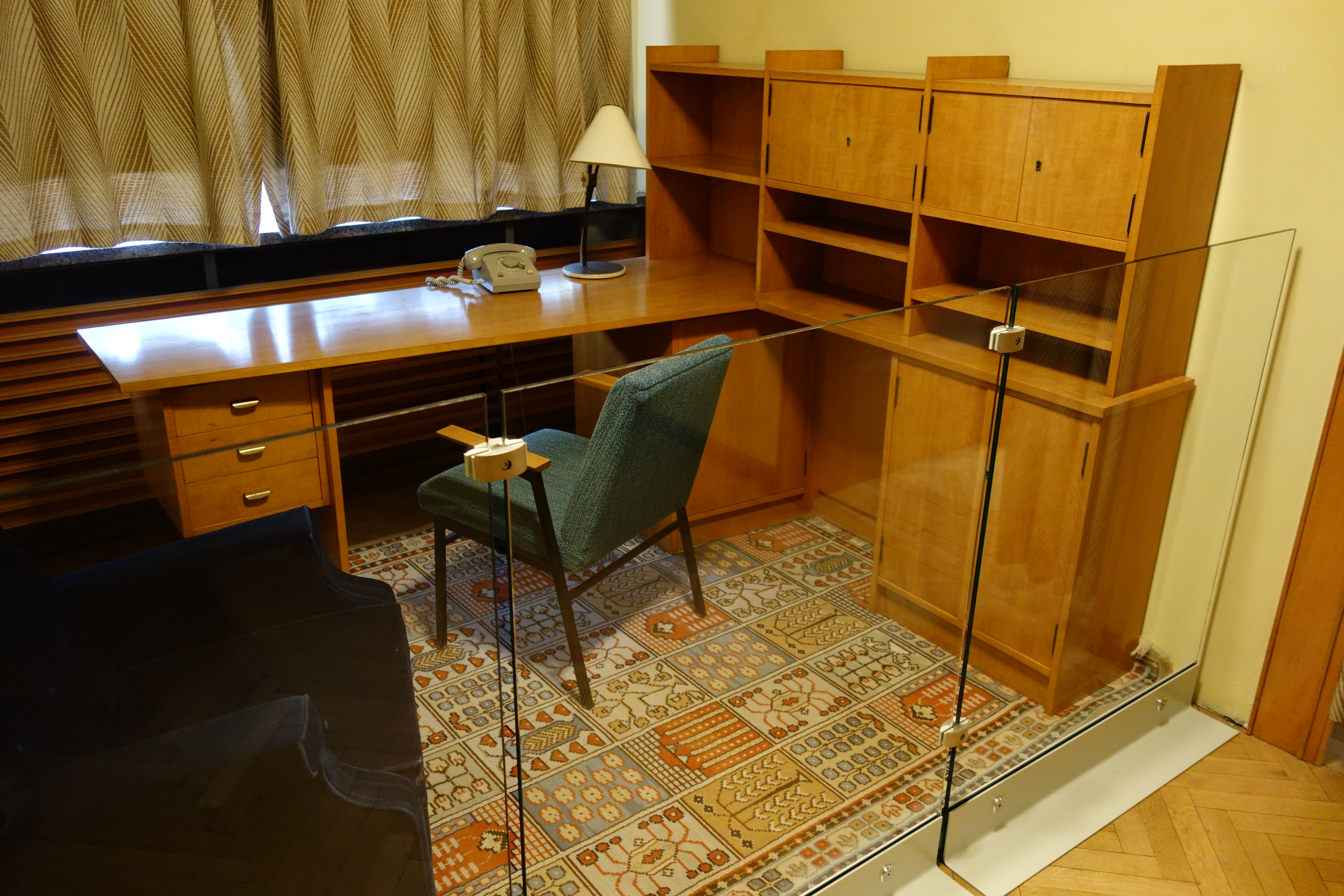

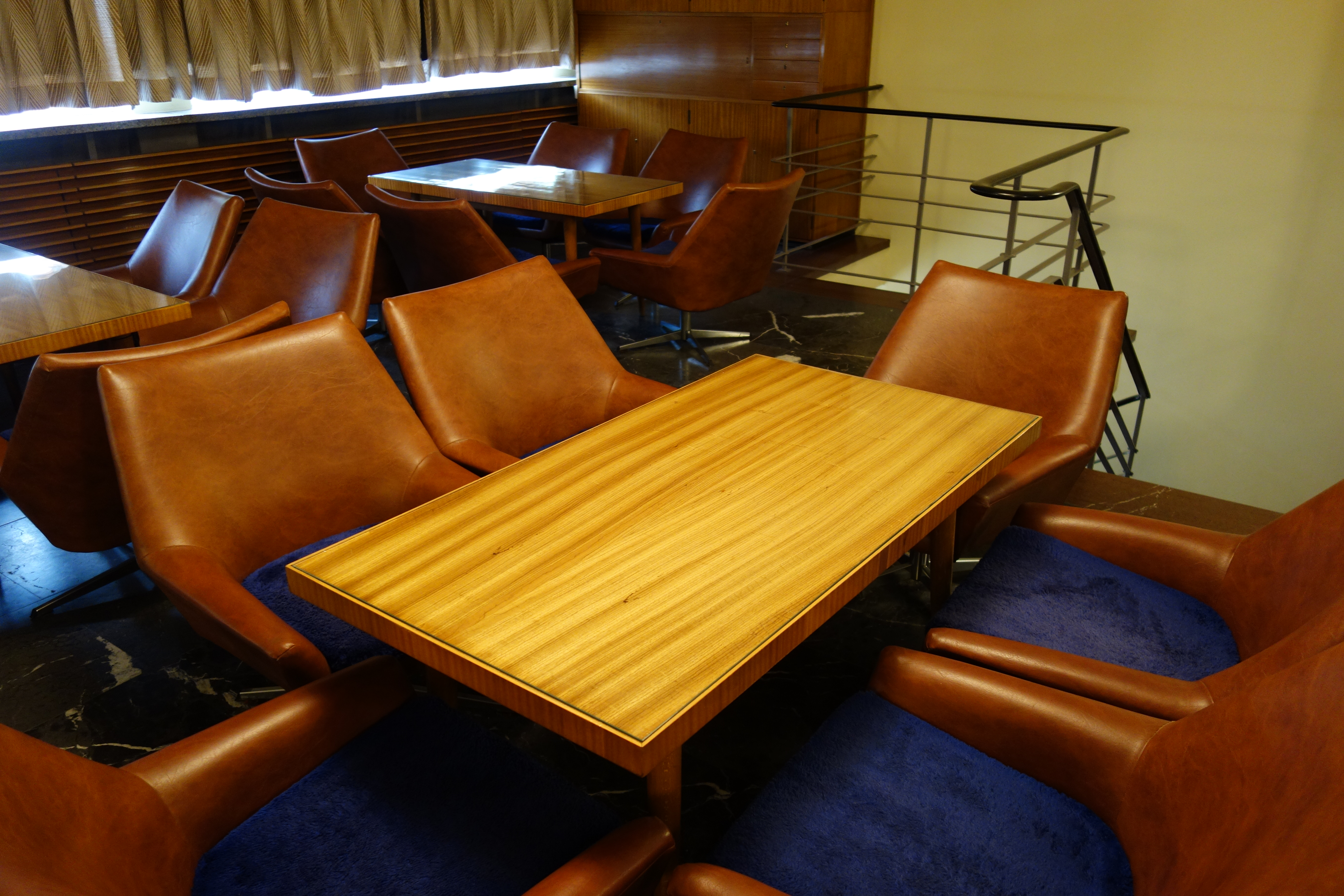

== See also ==
- Memorial and Education Centre Andreasstrasse (Erfurt)
