= 2T =

2T or 2-T may refer to:

== Transportation ==
- BermudAir (IATA code: 2T)
- Haïti Ambassador Airlines (former IATA code: 2T), a former airline
- Canada 3000 (former IATA code: 2T), a former airline
- 2T, a series of Toyota T engine models
- 2T oil or two-stroke oil

== See also ==
- -2T, a series of locomotive models; for example LMS Stanier 2-6-2T
- 2T Stalker, armoured vehicle used by the Belarusian Army
- T2 (disambiguation)
- TT (disambiguation)
- T-square (disambiguation), including T-squared
