= T2 Corporation Income Tax Return =

Corporation income tax return in Canada

The T2 Corporation Income Tax Return or T2 is the form used in Canada by corporations to file their income tax return. All corporations other than registered charities must file a T2 return for every taxation year, regardless of whether tax is payable. The form has to be filed within six months of the end of each corporation's fiscal year.

T2 is the federal, provincial, and territorial corporation income tax return across Canada, except in Quebec and Alberta, where a separate provincial return must also be filed.

== See also ==
- Taxation in Canada
