= Thalir Thiran Thittam =

Indian educational program

- Established: 2008
- Type: Life Skills Education Programme
- Managing Trustee: Bharath Krishna Sankar
- Website: aparajitha.org

Thalir Thiran Thittam (TTT; Tamil: தளிர்த் திறன் திட்டம்; Gujarati: ટિમ ટિમ તારા, romanized: Tim Tim Tara; Hindi: टिम टिम तारे, romanized: Tim Tim Tare) is a life skills-based educational program primarily designed for children and adolescents. With a motto of "Transformational Change Through Awareness, it was launched in 2008 by Madurai-based Aparajitha Foundations, the corporate social responsibility arm of Aparajitha Corporate Services. TTT has provided life skills education to 5,305,250 students at 39,498 schools in five Indian states (Tamil Nadu, Gujarat, Rajasthan, Haryana and Madhya Pradesh) through the state education departments. Its objective is the development of life skills which are not provided in the regular school curriculum.

== Background ==
The World Health Organization (WHO) defines life skills as "abilities for adaptive and positive behavior that enable humans to deal effectively with the demands and challenges of life." The United Nations' 1989 Convention on the Rights of the Child defined the objectives of child education in sections (a) to (e) of article 29. Aparajitha Foundations created TTT in 2008, based on these definitions.

== Objectives, structure, and curriculum ==
TTT was created with the following objectives:

1. To equip students to make informed choices by providing them with skills needed to cope with issues and problems related to their survival and well-being
2. To prepare students to become responsible, confident adults, enabling them to have self-esteem
3. To make students fit for the real world in which they would be responsible citizens, contributing to themselves, their families and society at large

The program has six stages: curriculum development, curriculum delivery, programmed implementation, programmed reinforcement, impact analysis and action research. Its curriculum is divided into 10 sections:

1. 10 life skills, as listed by World Health Organization (WHO):
  1. Self-awareness
  2. Empathy
  3. Interpersonal skills
  4. Communication
  5. Creative thinking
  6. Critical thinking
  7. Decision-making
  8. Problem solving
  9. Coping with emotions
  10. Coping with stress)
2. Values clarification
3. Etiquette
4. Time management
5. Goal setting
6. Health and hygiene
7. Gender sensitization
8. Laws of the land
9. Understanding the media
10. Ecology and the environment

== Levels ==
Students in grades 1–5 are in the primary-school category, and their program incorporates games, activities and songs. Students in grades 6–11 have 120 video lessons.

== Implementation ==
A pilot project was implemented in the 2008–2009 academic year at five higher secondary schools: two in Madurai, two government schools in Tirupathur in Sivaganga district, and one government school in Mallankinaru, Virudhunagar district. TTT was launched on 29 July 2008 at Government Higher Secondary School in Mallankinaru.

After the pilot project, TTT was extended to 2141 government-run high schools and 2018 government higher secondary schools in Tamil Nadu on 1 October 2009. In 2013, the program was extended to government-aided schools. TTT for primary students has been provided at primary and middle schools run by the Madurai Municipal Corporation since 2015.

A memorandum of understanding was signed to implement TTT's Gujarati version, Tim Tim Tara, at 489 government-run schools and 6,769 government–aided schools in the 2011–12 academic year. Since the beginning of the 2018–19 academic year, the lessons have been telecast on EDUSAT.

Another MoU was signed in February 2016 to implement the Hindi version, Tim Tim Tare, at 71 Rajasthan government model higher secondary schools and 1,340 government higher secondary schools in the 2016–17 academic year. Since the 2018–19 academic year, life-skills education has been imparted on EDUSAT.

Tim Tim Tare (Hindi) was piloted at 270 schools in eight districts of Madhya Pradesh's Indore Zone during the 2016–17 academic year. The program was extended to other schools in the zone during the 2017–18 academic year.

An MoU was signed in September 2017 to implement Tim Tim Tare at 14,000 Haryana schools in the 2017–18 academic year. During the 2018–19 academic year, lessons were provided on EDUSAT.
