= T2 =

T2, T-2, T 2, T_{2} or T^{2} may refer to:

== Computing ==
- Apple T2, a SoC from Apple for security and hardware management within Intel based Macs
- Palm Tungsten T2, a Palm OS-based personal digital assistant
- T2 or T-2, a 6.312 Mbit/s T-carrier in telecommunications
- T2, a German keyboard layout
- T2 Temporal Prover, an automated program analyzer by Microsoft Research
- UltraSPARC T2, a Sun Microsystem microprocessor
- T2 SDE, a Linux distribution kit
- T2 (social), later Pebble, a social platform

== Medicine and physiology ==
- T-2 mycotoxin, a type of trichothecene mycotoxin, a naturally occurring mold byproduct of certain species of Fusarium fungi
- T_{2} or diiodothyronine, a metabolite of thyroid hormone
- T2 hyperintensity, an area of high intensity on types of MRI scans of the brain that reflect lesions produced largely by demyelination and axonal loss
- T2, the second highest (closest to the neck) of the thoracic vertebrae, the bones of the spine of the upper back
  - T2, the thoracic spinal nerve 2
- T2, a small-to-moderate size cancerous tumor in the TNM staging system
- T2, referring to the second terga on an arthropod's abdomen
- T2, transverse relaxation time, in magnetic resonance imaging (MRI), a measure of the time taken for spinning protons to lose phase coherence among the nuclei spinning perpendicular to the main magnetic field

== Entertainment ==
=== Books ===
- T2 (novel series), a literary trilogy that continues after Terminator 2: Judgment Day

=== Films ===
- Terminator 2: Judgment Day, a 1991 science fiction film
- T2 (2009 film), a 2009 Filipino film
- T2 Trainspotting, a 2017 sequel to Trainspotting

=== Games ===
- Tak 2: The Staff of Dreams, a 2004 video game
- Take-Two Interactive, American multinational publisher distributor of video games
- Tekken 2, a 1995 fighting game
- Thief II: The Metal Age, a 2000 video game
- Tribes 2, a 2001 video game
- Tsquared (born 1987), American e-sports gamer
- Turok 2: Seeds of Evil, a 1998 video game

=== Music ===
- T2 (band), a British progressive rock band
- T2 (producer), British producer most notable for the track "Heartbroken", which reached No. 2 in the UK Singles Chart
- T2 (Indonesia band), a female group from Indonesia formed in 2005

=== Sport ===
- Portland Timbers 2, an American soccer club in the United Soccer League
- T2 (classification), a para-cycling classification
- Terrell Thomas (born 1985), American football player who plays for the New York Giants

== Science and specifications ==
- T-mount, a Tamron lens thread specification
- T-2, the second Jupiter Trojan survey, a subproject of the Palomar–Leiden survey
- T2, a fluorescent tube diameter designation
- T_{2}, a mathematical concept used in topology, see Hausdorff space
- T_{2} or spin–spin relaxation time, a time constant in radiology
- T2, a temperature classification, also referred to as a T-code, on electrical equipment labeled for hazardous locations
- T2 (Torx size), a six-sided screw, bolt or driver size
- T2 or Treadmill 2, on board the International Space Station

== Transport ==
=== Air ===
- ACAZ T.2, a Belgian monoplane designed in 1924
- Antonov T-2M Maverick, ultralight trike aircraft
- Fokker F.IV, aircraft designated T-2 when used by the United States Army Air Service
- Perry Beadle T.2, a 1914 British biplane
- Mitsubishi T-2, a 1971 Japanese jet trainer aircraft
- T-2 Buckeye (aircraft)
- Thai Air Cargo, IATA airline designator
- He 115 A-2, torpedo bomber designated T 2 in Swedish service.

=== Rail ===
- T2 Leppington & Inner West Line, a rail service in Sydney, Australia
- Paris Tramway Line 2
- Tatra T2, a 1955 Czechoslovak tramcar
- T2, a model of the OS T1000 train of the Oslo Metro
- Kippa-Ring line (numbered T2), a Queensland Rail service
- Springfield Central line (numbered T2), a Queensland Rail service, Australia

=== Road ===
- Estonian national road 2, officially T2, connecting Tallinn, Tartu, Võru and Luhamaa
- T2 road (Tanzania), a road in Tanzania
- T2 road (Zambia), a road in Zambia
  - Great North Road, Zambia
- T2 road (Jamaica), a road in Jamaica
- T2 (Tram İzmir), a tram line in İzmir, Turkey

=== Racing ===
- Ferrari 312T2, a 1976 Formula One car
- Ferrari 412 T2, a 1995 Formula One car

=== Other ===
- Ford T2 platform
- Soyuz T-2, a 1980 Soviet mission to the Salyut 6 space station.
- Heathrow Terminal 2
- T2, a type of transit lane in Australia
- T2 tank, a tank prototype that evolved into the M2 light tank
- T2 tank recovery vehicle, another name for the M31 variant of the M3 Lee tank
- T2 tanker, a mass-produced tanker used during and after World War II
- Volkswagen Type 2, Volkswagen car model
- Mercedes-Benz T2, a light commercial vehicle manufactured by Daimler-Benz
- Jetour T2, a midsize SUV

== Other uses ==
- T2 (tea products company), Australian retail chain of tea stores
- T2 (telecommunications company), a telecommunications company in Russia
- T2 (RTGS), real-time gross settlement system owned and operated by Eurosystem
- T2, a bedside television unit used by Hospedia
- T2 or T2 Corporation Income Tax Return, a corporate tax form in Canada
- T2, the nickname for the now-defunct weekday supplement, times2, in The Times of London
- T2, a FAST (free ad-supported streaming television) channel owned by the Tennis Channel
- T2 (roller coaster), a roller coaster at Six Flags Kentucky Kingdom
- T-2 (ISP), an Internet Service Provider in Slovenia
- T-2, a second partial float of the formerly government-owned Telstra telecommunications provider in Australia
- T+2, "trade date plus two days" in financial markets

== See also ==
- 2T (disambiguation)
- TT (disambiguation)
- T-square (disambiguation), including T-squared
- A tornado intensity rating on the TORRO scale
