= The Local =

European digital news publisher

- Website type: News
- Owner: The Local Europe AB
- Website: www.thelocal.com
- Commercial: Yes
- Registration: Required for certain editions
- Launched: 2004
- Current status: Active

The Local is a multi-regional, European digital news publisher targeting expats, labour migrants and second home owners. It has nine local editions: The Local Austria, The Local Denmark, The Local France, The Local Germany, The Local Italy, The Local Norway, The Local Spain, The Local Sweden and The Local Switzerland. Each site, while alike in appearance, has separate editorial teams, each focused on its respective market.

The parent company The Local Europe AB, has its headquarters in Stockholm, Sweden.

== History ==
The Local was founded in Stockholm in 2004 by Paul Rapacioli, formerly a director of reed.co.uk and managing editor James Savage, formerly a radio journalist and PR consultant. Rapacioli was managing director from 2004-2018.

The original Swedish edition began in early 2004 as a weekly email newsletter which Paul Rapacioli started sending to other students in his "Swedish for Immigrants" class. The first news site was launched in Sweden in August 2004. The German edition was launched in 2008 and Swiss edition in 2011. In 2013 the company opened offices in France, Spain and Italy. By January 2015 the company claimed to have over 4.5 million readers per month. James Savage succeeded Paul Rapacioli as managing director in 2018.

In 2009, The Local acquired the website Toytown Germany from its founder, James Pearn, who was subsequently hired by The Local as their Chief technology officer.

In 2010, following the death of its creator, The Local acquired Englishforum.ch, a chat forum for English-speaking expatriates in Switzerland.

In January 2010 The Local acquired the thelocal.com domain name from First Quench Retailing, a UK alcohol retailer which went into administration at the end of 2009.

In February 2024, both the English Forum for Switzerland and the German Toytown forum were closed, with moderators receiving notice that the company had determined that server costs were too high.

== Coverage ==
The Local's journalism has a heavy focus on issues connected to migration and integration, for example Germany's dual citizenship reforms, work permit reforms in Sweden and the impact of Brexit.

== Ownership ==
Shareholders include venture capital firm CSB Capital, the 6th AP Fund and Almi Invest.

== Business model ==
In late 2017, The Local launched a subscription model (marketed as membership), beginning with the Swedish edition. Throughout 2018, The Local's membership programme was rolled out to other editions including Germany, France, Italy, and Spain. By early 2022 The Local had over 50,000 members.

In 2021 the company had a turnover of 33.7 million SEK and a profit of 2.6 million SEK. In 2022, the company had a turnover of 35 million SEK and a loss of 1.6 million SEK.

== Awards ==
The Local's Swedish edition was nominated in 2009 as Swedish Digital Newspaper of the Year ('Årets Dagstidning Digitala Medier'), as part of media magazine Medievärlden's annual newspaper awards.

In 2018, The Local's Swedish edition was named Digital Publisher of the Year Award in the Popular Press category by the Swedish Magazine Publishers Association (Sveriges Tidskrifter).

The Local's Client Studio received the bronze award in the Best Use of Online Media category at the 2018 Native Advertising Awards in Berlin.

The Local's CEO James Savage received the Swedish Magazine Publishers' Associations Grand Prize (Sveriges tidskrifters stora pris) in 2021.
