= 3T Cycling =

Italian cycle sport company

- Trade name: 3T
- Type: Private
- Industry: Bicycle industry
- Founded: 1961; 65 years ago, Bergamo
- Founder: Mario Dedioniggi
- Headquarters: Bergamo, Italy
- Products: Bicycles, Bicycle frame and related components
- Website: 3t.bike

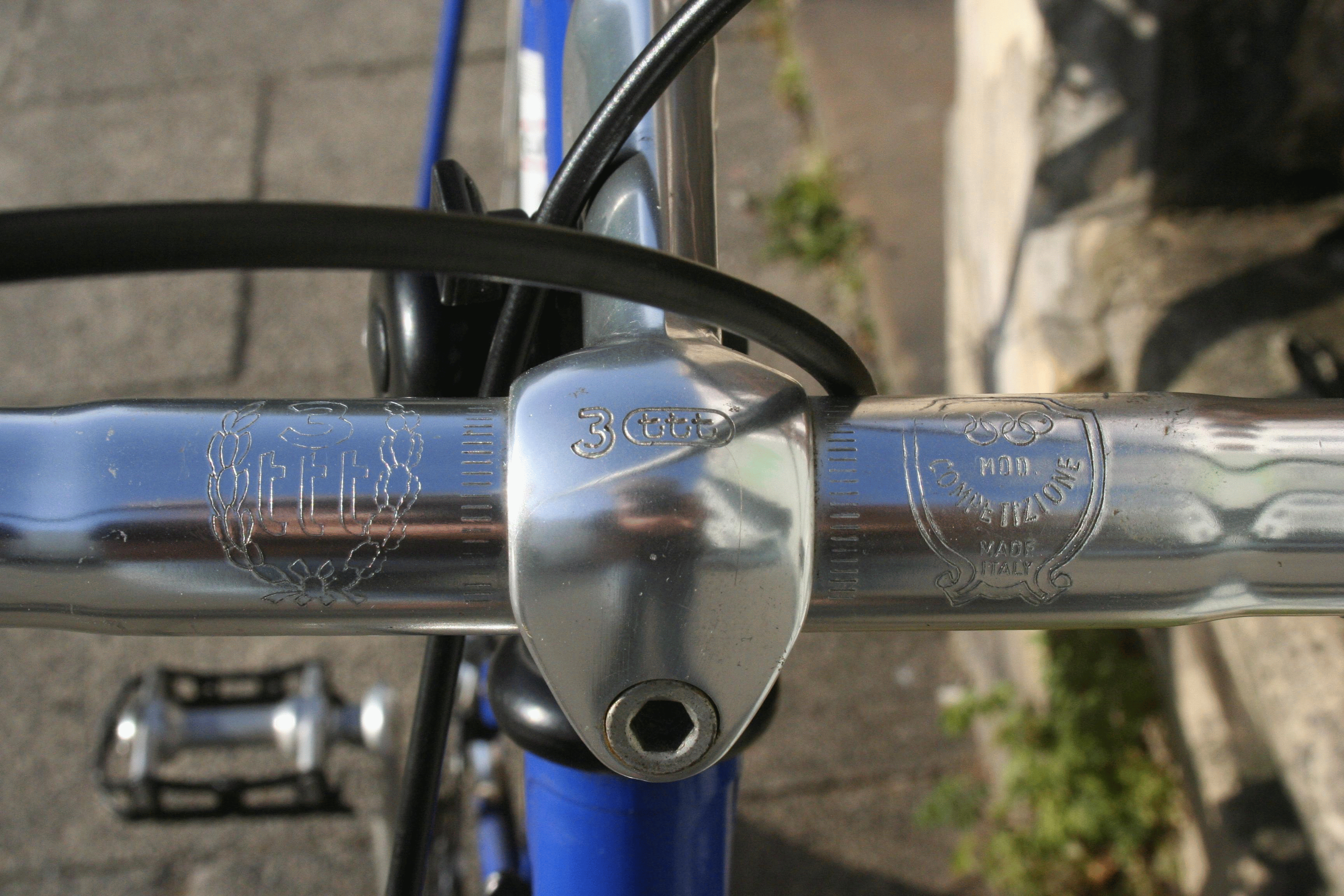
3T handlebar and stem

3T Cycling is an Italian cycle sport company. It was founded in 1961.

3T switched production to carbon-fiber composite materials and in 2008 returned to pro cycling after several years' absence. For the 2008 season it sponsored the CSC–Saxo Bank team which won the Tour de France. 3T sponsored three pro teams; Garmin–Slipstream, Cervélo TestTeam and Team Milram for the 2009 professional season.

In 2013 3T was a sponsor for BMC Racing Team.

3T debuted its first "gravel" bicycle in June 2016, and followed with their second the year after.

3T is the manufacturing partner for all models of BMW branded bicycles.

== History ==
3T was founded by Mario Dedioniggi in Turin in 1961. It is located in Bergamo and originally known as 3TTT—Tecnologia del Tubo Torino (Turin Tube Technology).

In 1970, 3T switched production to aluminum alloy in place of steel, to cut down on weight. By the late 1990s, 3T started using carbon-fiber composites.

For the 2008 season, 3T sponsored Team CSC. The team's World Champion time trialist, Fabian Cancellara, rode it during the Tour of California. During the European season at the Giro d'Italia, CSC's team failed to win the race's opening Team Time Trial.

For the 2009 season, 3T sponsored three professional teams: Cervélo TestTeam, Garmin Slipstream, and Milram.

== See also ==
- List of bicycle parts
- List of Italian companies
