= Haïti Ambassador Airlines =

Private airline based in Port-au-Prince, Haiti

IATA	ICAO	Call sign
2T	HAM	-
- Founded: 2002
- Fleet size: 1
- Destinations: New York-JFK, Port-Au-Prince
- Headquarters: Port-au-Prince, Haiti

Haiti Ambassador Airlines was an airline based in Port-au-Prince, Haiti. It was a private airline operating an international service to New York City and Miami.

== History ==
The airline was established in April 2002 and started operations in 2003. It was owned by Christopher Doyle (48%), Georgemay Figaro, Airline President (48%), Jean-Philippe Padern (2%) and Kathleen Buteau (2%).

== Services ==
Haiti Ambassador Airlines operated an international service between Port-au-Prince and New York (John F. Kennedy International Airport) in January 2005.

== Fleet ==
The Haiti Ambassador Airlines fleet consisted of one Boeing 767-300 aircraft leased from LAN in January 2005.
