= Toytown Germany =

Web site for English-speaking foreigners in Germany

Toytown Germany, known as "TT" to its users, was an English-language community website for Germany. It was an information resource, a meeting point and a communication platform for English-speaking foreigners throughout Germany.

== Website ==
This moderated community was free to join, but required registration to participate. The site was frequented by travellers and expatriates alike. It was owned and operated by The Local Europe AB, publisher of The Local, an English-language digital news publisher with local editions in Sweden, Austria, Germany, France, Spain, Switzerland, Norway and Italy.

Toytown Germany, provided information about all aspects of life in Germany and its various cities and regions, from local bar and restaurant guides with reviews to events and advice on dealing with the confusion expatriates often face when dealing with life in a new country. The site additionally included areas for classified advertisements. The heart of the site was the chat forum in which English speakers discussed news, posed questions, gave advice and organised social events.

Toytown Germany was partnered with major German news companies, including Der Spiegel, Deutsche Welle, and Die Welt. News feeds from those companies were published on the website. In return, the latest German news related discussions from the chat forum were published on the English news pages of Die Welt. While those mainstream news companies provided professional reporting, Toytown Germany provided the general public with a community platform on which to discuss the latest news from Germany.

== History ==
The site was originally created in August 2002 as "Toytown Munich". The name originated from the observation that Munich was an unusually clean, well-organised, and crime-free city. In mid-2006, the site merged with Britboard, another expatriate site geared toward British expatriates in Germany. Shortly thereafter a decision was made to expand to cover all of Germany and the name was changed to reflect this.

In February 2024, the forum was closed. Members of Toytown Germany then created a new, non-commercial chat forum.
