= Corredor Polonês =

Studio album by Patife Band
- Released: 1987 (re-released in 2001)
- Genre: Post-punk, punk rock, experimental rock, math rock, noise rock
- Label: WEA
- Producer: Pena Schmidt

Patife Band chronology
Patife Band (1985)	Corredor Polonês (1987)	Ao Vivo (2003)

Corredor Polonês (Portuguese for Polish Corridor) is the only studio album by Brazilian post-punk/experimental rock band Patife Band. It was released in 1987 via WEA, and reissued on CD in 2001.

The track "Poema em Linha Reta" is a poem written by Portuguese poet Fernando Pessoa under the pseudonym Álvaro de Campos set to music; both it and "Pregador Maldito" were re-recorded from the soundtrack of the 1986 film Cidade Oculta.

"Vida de Operário" is a cover of Brazilian punk band Excomungados; Pato Fu would more famously cover it as well, on their 1995 album Gol de Quem?

"Chapéu Vermelho" is a Portuguese-language adaptation/translation of the song "Li'l Red Riding Hood", written by Ronald Blackwell and originally performed by Sam the Sham and the Pharaohs. Hamilton Di Giorgio provided the translation into Portuguese.

Ratos de Porão covered the track "Tô Tenso", while Cássia Eller covered "Teu Bem".

== Track listing ==
No.	Title	Lyrics	Length
1.	"Corredor Polonês" (Polish Corridor)	Paulo Barnabé	4:02
2.	"Pesadelo" (Nightmare)	Arrigo Barnabé, Paulo Barnabé	1:21
3.	"Chapéu Vermelho" (Red Hat)	Ronald Blackwell (adaptation by Hamilton Di Giorgio)	3:41
4.	"Tô Tenso" (I'm Nervous)	Arrigo Barnabé, Itamar Assumpção, Paulo Barnabé	3:00
5.	"Poema em Linha Reta" (Poem in a Straight Line)	Fernando Pessoa	2:06
6.	"Teu Bem" (Your Good)	Paulo Barnabé	3:46
7.	"Três por Quatro" (Three Out of Four)	Paulo Barnabé	2:17
8.	"Pregador Maldito" (Damned Preacher)	Paulo Barnabé	2:24
9.	"Vida de Operário" (The Life of a Worker — Excomungados cover)	Falcão	3:16
10.	"Maria Louca" (Mad Maria)	Instrumental	2:51

== Personnel ==
- Paulo Barnabé – vocals
- André Fonseca – guitars
- Cidão Trindade – drums
- Sidney Giovenazzi – bass
- Paulo Mello – piano
- Pena Schmidt – production, mastering
- Liminha – art direction
