= Patife Band (EP) =

EP by Patife Band
- Released: 1985
- Genre: Post-punk, punk rock, experimental rock, math rock, noise rock
- Label: Lira Paulistana Records
- Producer: Sílvia Avanzi, Idafoggia, Paulo Barnabé

Patife Band chronology
Patife Band (1985)	Corredor Polonês (1987)

Patife Band is the first official release from the homonymous Brazilian post-punk/experimental rock band Patife Band, released in 1985 by now-defunct independent label Lira Paulistana Records. The song selection includes four original compositions by Patife Band, as well as punk rock-inflected covers of Bobby di Carlo's "Tijolinho" and of the Portuguese-language anonymous adaptation of the traditional Christmas song "Silent Night".

"Pregador Maldito" would appear on the soundtrack of the 1986 Brazilian film Cidade Oculta, directed by Chico Botelho and starring Paulo Barnabé's older brother, Arrigo, who also compiled and provided some tracks for the OST. The tracks "Pregador Maldito", "Pesadelo" and "Tô Tenso" would be re-recorded for their debut Corredor Polonês.

== Track listing ==
No.	Title	Lyrics	Length
1.	"Tijolinho" (Little Brick — Bobby di Carlo cover)	Wagner Benatti	2:10
2.	"Pregador Maldito" (Damned Preacher)	Paulo Barnabé	2:05
3.	"Pesadelo" (Nightmare)	Arrigo Barnabé, Paulo Barnabé	1:00
4.	"Tô Tenso" (I'm Nervous)	Arrigo Barnabé, Itamar Assumpção, Paulo Barnabé	2:53
5.	"Noite Feliz" (Jolly Night)	Franz Xaver Gruber	2:03
6.	"Peiote" (Peyote)	Instrumental	2:50

== Personnel ==
Patife Band

- Paulo Barnabé – vocals, production, mixing
- André Fonseca – guitars, production, mixing
- Cidão Trindade – drums
- Sidney Giovenazzi – bass
- Nicolino Bloise, Eduardo Santos – production, mixing
- Renata Silva – cover art
- Sílvia Avanzi, Idafoggia – production
