= Lívio Tragtenberg =

Brazilian composer and music theorist (born 1961)

- Born: Lívio Romano Tragtenberg; 1961 (age 64–65); São Paulo, São Paulo, Brazil
- Genre: Experimental music
- Occupations: Musician, composer, music theorist, professor, record producer
- Instruments: Saxophone, bass clarinet, keyboards
- Years active: 1980–present

Lívio Romano Tragtenberg (born 1961) is a Brazilian musician, composer, music theorist, professor and record producer.

== Biography ==
Tragtenberg was born in São Paulo in 1961, to professor and sociologist Maurício Tragtenberg and actress Beatriz Tragtenberg. On his father's side, he is of German-Jewish descent, and has a brother – Marcelo, a physician – and a sister – Lucila, a soprano singer. When he was 13 years old he learned by himself how to play the drum kit, leading on to other instruments. During his later youth he met and befriended poets Décio Pignatari and siblings Haroldo and Augusto de Campos, who heavily influenced him, later dropping out from high school to follow a career on music. His debut album, Ritual, came out in 1980. Later in the 1980s he composed the operas O. de A. do Brasil and O Inferno de Wall Street, the latter based on a poem by 19th-century author Sousândrade, and was a session musician for the 1988 EP The Early Years, by progressive rock band Violeta de Outono.

Throughout the 1990s to the mid-2000s he continued to release albums, collaborating with Pignatari and Wilson Sukorski, and was a music theory professor for Unicamp from 1990 to 1998. He also taught at the Pontifical Catholic University of São Paulo. Around the same time he met and befriended filmmaker Tata Amaral, and subsequently composed the soundtrack of many of her films, such as Um Céu de Estrelas (1996) and Hoje (2011); previously he has also worked with Lúcia Murat in 2000, Joel Pizzini in 2001 and Roberto Moreira in 2004. He also managed the projects Blind Sound Orchestra (which is composed of blind musicians) and the Orquestras de Músicos das Ruas de São Paulo (composed of street musicians of different cultural backgrounds).

In the mid-2010s, Tragtenberg and Rogério Skylab collaborated in a trilogy of albums: Skylab & Tragtenberg, Vol. 1, Vol. 2 and Vol. 3. Skylab once claimed to be a huge fan of Tragtenberg's work, and had previously interviewed him for his talk show Matador de Passarinho. In 2019, Tragtenberg collaborated again with Skylab by pre-mixing and providing samples for the latter's albums Nas Portas do Cu and Crítica da Faculdade do Cu, and once more in 2020 co-authoring his album Os Cosmonautas.

Tragtenberg also authored many books about music theory.

== Work ==
- 2019 - CONSTRUTORES DE SONS - CD SELO SESC
- 2018 - Skylab & Tragtenberg, Vol. 3 com Rogério Skylab
- 2016 - Skylab & Tragtenberg, Vol. 2 com Rogério Skylab
- 2016 - Skylab e Tragtenberg, Vol. 1 com Rogério Skylab
- 2016 - SOUND BRIDGES EXPEIREIENCE, Mousontourm, Frankfurt Germany.
- 2015 - O OFICIO DO COMPOSITOR HOJE (ORG.) Coleção Signos/Música,Editora Perspectiva.
- 2014 - Reincorporação dos Homens de Cor, Campinas, SP.
- 2013 - Prelúdicos 1-12, CD para piano solo.
- 2010 - O Gabinete do Dr. Estranho, instalação na Bienal de São Paulo.
- 2009 - Orquestra de Musicos das Ruas do Rio de Janeiro
- 2008 - BLIND SOUND ORCHESTRA músicos cegos tocam filmes mudos
- 2008 - Voz, Verso e Avesso CD com Lucila Tragtenberg sobre poemas e traduções de Haroldo de Campos.
- 2008 - Strassenmusikerberlinerorchester - com músicos das ruas de Berlim, Alemanha
- 2007 - Luartrovado" a partir de Pierrot Lunaire de Schoenberg
- 2007 - Balada do Deus Morto a partir de Flávio de Carvalho
- 2006 - Melodia Cucaracha um musical clandestino
- 2005 - Nervous City Orchestra com músicos imigrantes em Miami, EUA.
- 2005 - Start collaboration in dance-theatre productions in Germany, in Berlin, Hamburg, Stuttgart, Koln, Essen, Dresden, among others cities.
- 2005 - Personas Sonoras com músicos de rua virtuais
- 2005 - ReinCorporação Musical com a Corporação Musical Operária da Lapa no Festival 4Hype no SESC Pompéia, São Paulo.
- 2004 - Neuropolis com a Orquestra de Músicos das Ruas de São Paulo, CD lançado em 2007 pelo Selo SESC.
- 1999 - Parque Industrial teatro musical com vídeo a partir do romance Parque Industrial de Patrícia Galvão (Mara Lobo) - Pagú.
- 1998 - Pasolini Suite e Hansel und Gretel Suite, CD, Hamburg, Alemanha.
- 1995 - OTHELLO - Das ist Die Nacht CD com Sei Miguel e Silvia Ocougne, Stuttgert, Alemanha.
- 1991 - Tatuturema (ópera) (bolsa da John Simon Guggenheim Foundation)
- 1998 - Música de Cena - Coleção Signos/Música -Editora Perspectiva
- 1997 - Alles Bewegung para piano e orquestra. Estreado pela Orquestra Sinfônica Municipal de Campinas.
- 1994 - ANJOS NEGROS - CD com música de teatro 1984-1994)
- 1994 - Contraponto, Uma arte de Compor, Editora da Universidade de São Paulo - EDUSP.
- 1990 - Artigos Musicais - Coleção Debates, Editora Perspectiva.
- 1990 - Teleros para Orquestra e performer sobre texto de Décio Pignatari
- 1989 - A Cena da Origem sobre textos e traduções de Haroldo de Campos.
- 1987 - Inferno de Wall Street (ópera) (Prêmio Vitae)
- 1986 - Bailado do Deus Morto baseado em Flåvio de Carvalho. Oficinas Culturais Tres Rios.
- 1985 - Five Saints? - video-instalação na Bienal Internacional de São Paulo, com R. Bulcão.
- 1986 - Máscaras para Pound - cantata cênica sobre textos de Ezra Pound para orquestra de câmara e solistas.
- 1984 - O. DE A. DO BRASIL para comemoração dos 30 anos de falecimento do poeta Oswald de Andrade. Encomendado pela Prefeitura de São Paulo para o Teatro Municipal de São Paulo. Para orquestra, coro e meios eletrônicos. Estreado em dezembro de 1984.
- 1982 - Ritual para Sousândrade com a participação de Baldur Liesenberg e Cristiano Mota. Criações sonoras a partir de textos do poeta maranhense Joaquim de Sousândrade.
- 1980 - Ritual, LP, Rio de Janeiro, RJ.
- 1979 - Mostra de Musica Contemporânea, Teatro Anchieta, SESC, São Paulo.
