= Patife Band =

Brazilian post-punk band

- Also known as: Paulo Patife Band (1983)
- Origin: São Paulo, Brazil
- Genres: Post-punk, experimental rock, noise rock, math rock
- Years active: 1983–1990; 2003; 2005–present
- Labels: Lira Paulistana, WEA, PISCES Entretenimento Ltda.
- Members: Paulo Barnabé; Richard Firmino; Paulo Braga; Matheus Leston; Gustavo Boni; Paulo Mello; Fábio Gouvêa
- Past members: Sidney Giovenazzi; Maurício Biazzi; James Muller; Cidão Trindade; Eduardo Batistela; André Fonseca
- Website: pisces.com.br/patifeband

Patife Band ("patife" is a word in Portuguese meaning "stooge" or "knucklehead") is a Brazilian post-punk band formed in São Paulo in 1983 by Paulo Barnabé, initially under the name Paulo Patife Band. They are considered to be one of the major exponents of the "Vanguarda Paulistana" movement. Characterized by its heavily experimental and almost non-descript musical style, that uses dodecaphonism and atonality as main principles of composition and flirts with many different genres such as jazz, punk rock, traditional Brazilian music and popular music, it was favorably compared to American band Pere Ubu, and one critic at some point called their sound "a crossing between King Crimson and Fear".

The band was disestablished in 1990, but reformed briefly in 2003 with a new line-up and releasing a live album. In 2005 it was reformed again with yet another line-up, and since then they make sporadic shows around São Paulo. A further change on the band's line-up was made in 2015.

== History ==
Heavily influenced by the style of Itamar Assumpção, Patife Band was founded in São Paulo in 1983 as Paulo Patife Band, by Paulo Barnabé (the younger brother of Brazilian actor and musician Arrigo Barnabé), André Fonseca (who would form experimental rock band Okotô in 1987, and serve as synthpop band Metrô's guitarist from 2002 to 2004), Sidney Giovenazzi and James Muller. Muller, however, left the band one year later, and was replaced by Cidão Trindade. In the same year, they simplified their name to Patife Band.

In 1985, Patife Band released their first work, a self-titled EP, via independent label Lira Paulistana Records, containing the songs "Tijolinho" (a Bobby di Carlo cover), "Tô Tenso" (that was covered by Ratos de Porão) and a cover of the traditional Christmas song "Silent Night", among others. In the following year, two songs by them, "Pregador Maldito" and an early version of "Poema em Linha Reta", appeared in the soundtrack of the film Cidade Oculta, which starred Paulo's brother Arrigo.

Their only studio album, Corredor Polonês, was released in 1987 via WEA. Included in it, among others, are "Poema em Linha Reta" (a poem by Portuguese poet Fernando Pessoa set to music), "Vida de Operário" (an Excomungados cover), "Teu Bem" and the eponymous "Corredor Polonês". (The latter two songs would reach a higher fame after being covered by Cássia Eller and Ratos de Porão, respectively.) After a short tour to promote the album, the band ended in 1990.

After a 13-year hiatus, Patife Band was briefly re-established in 2003 with a different line-up — Maurício Biazzi replaced former bassist Sidney Giovenazzi and Eduardo Batistela replaced drummer Cidão Trindade — and played at the Festival Demo Sound in Londrina, Paraná. A live album of their performance in the festival, titled Ao Vivo, was released in the same year, and is available for streaming at the band's official Myspace.

In 2005 they reunited once more, with yet another line-up, and have been doing sporadic shows ever since. In early 2015, longtime guitarist André Fonseca parted ways with the band and was replaced by Fábio Gouvêa; new members Paulo Mello (who had already worked with the band as a session member on their debut, Corredor Polonês) and Paulo Braga joined the group as well. They are currently recording a single.

Two songs by Patife Band were featured in the compilation album The Sexual Life of the Savages, released in 2005 by British label Soul Jazz Records. A picture of Paulo Barnabé was used as the compilation's cover.

== Discography ==
=== Studio albums ===
- Corredor Polonês (1987)

=== Extended plays ===
- Patife Band (1985)

=== Live albums ===
- Ao Vivo (2003)

=== Compilations ===
- The Sexual Life of the Savages (2005)

Featured the songs "Teu Bem" and "Poema em Linha Reta".

== Line-up ==
=== Current members ===
- Paulo Barnabé – vocals, percussion (1983–1990, 2003, 2005–)
- Richard Firmino – alto sax (2005–)
- Paulo Braga – piano (2015–)
- Matheus Leston – synthesizers (2005–)
- Gustavo Boni – bass (2005–)
- Paulo Mello – drums (2015–)
- Fábio Gouvêa – guitar (2015–)

=== Former members ===
- Sidney Giovenazzi – bass (1983–1990)
- Maurício Biazzi – bass (2003)
- James Muller – drums (1983–1984)
- Cidão Trindade – drums (1984–1990)
- Eduardo Batistela – drums (2003)
- André Fonseca – guitars (1983–1990, 2003, 2005–2015)
