= Skylab & Tragtenberg, Vol. 3 =

Studio album by Rogério Skylab and Lívio Tragtenberg
- Released: July 11, 2018
- Genre: Experimental music; MPB; electronica; minimal music
- Length: 1:02:26
- Label: Self-released
- Producer: Rogério Skylab

Rogério Skylab chronology
O Rei do Cu (2018)	Skylab & Tragtenberg, Vol. 3 (2018)	Nas Portas do Cu (2019)

Singles from Skylab & Tragtenberg, Vol. 3
- 1. "Bocetinha de Cocô" Released: November 5, 2017

Skylab & Tragtenberg, Vol. 3 is a collaborative album between Brazilian musicians Rogério Skylab and Lívio Tragtenberg. The final installment of the Skylab & Tragtenberg trilogy, it was self-released on July 11, 2018, and is available for digital download/streaming on Deezer, the iTunes Store and Spotify, as well as on Skylab's official website. The track "Bocetinha de Cocô" previously appeared as a teaser on Skylab's EP Skylab, released the year prior, and was uploaded separately as a single on Skylab's YouTube channel on November 5, 2017.

The album counts with a guest appearance by Luiz Tatit, famous for his work with MPB band Grupo Rumo; he co-composed and provided vocals for the track "Índio Infinito", whose lyrics originally appeared as one of the poems in Skylab's 2006 book Debaixo das Rodas de um Automóvel.

The lyrics to "Travesti" were taken from an excerpt of Décio Pignatari's poem "O Lobisomem" ("The Werewolf").

== Track listing ==
All lyrics are written by Rogério Skylab, except for "Travesti" by Décio Pignatari; all music is composed by Lívio Tragtenberg, except for "Índio Infinito" by Tragtenberg and Luiz Tatit.

No.	Title	English title	Length
1.	"Ogum"		3:35
2.	"Coitus Interruptus" (instrumental)		4:05
3.	"Companheiro"	Companion	5:39
4.	"Quando a Noite Chegar"	When the Night Comes	9:42
5.	"Dança dos Malucos"	The Madmen's Dance	7:59
6.	"Bocetinha de Cocô"	Poopy Pussy	4:33
7.	"Nova Bossa"	New Bossa	3:23
8.	"Travesti"	Transvestite	4:18
9.	"Morto-Vivo"	Undead	1:34
10.	"Palito de Fósforo" (instrumental)	Matchstick	5:15
11.	"Não Quero"	I Don't Want It	0:36
12.	"Índio Infinito" (feat. Luiz Tatit)	Infinite Indian	3:23
13.	"É Tarde"	It's Late	6:15
14.	"Vampiro"	Vampire	2:14

== Personnel ==
- Rogério Skylab – vocals, production
- Luiz Tatit – vocals (track 12)
- Lívio Tragtenberg – bass clarinet, keyboards, programming, mixing, arrangements
- Thiago Martins – electric guitar, classical guitar
- Daniel Nakamura – mastering
- Carlos Mancuso – cover art
