= Paulo Leminski =

Brazilian poet (1944–1989)

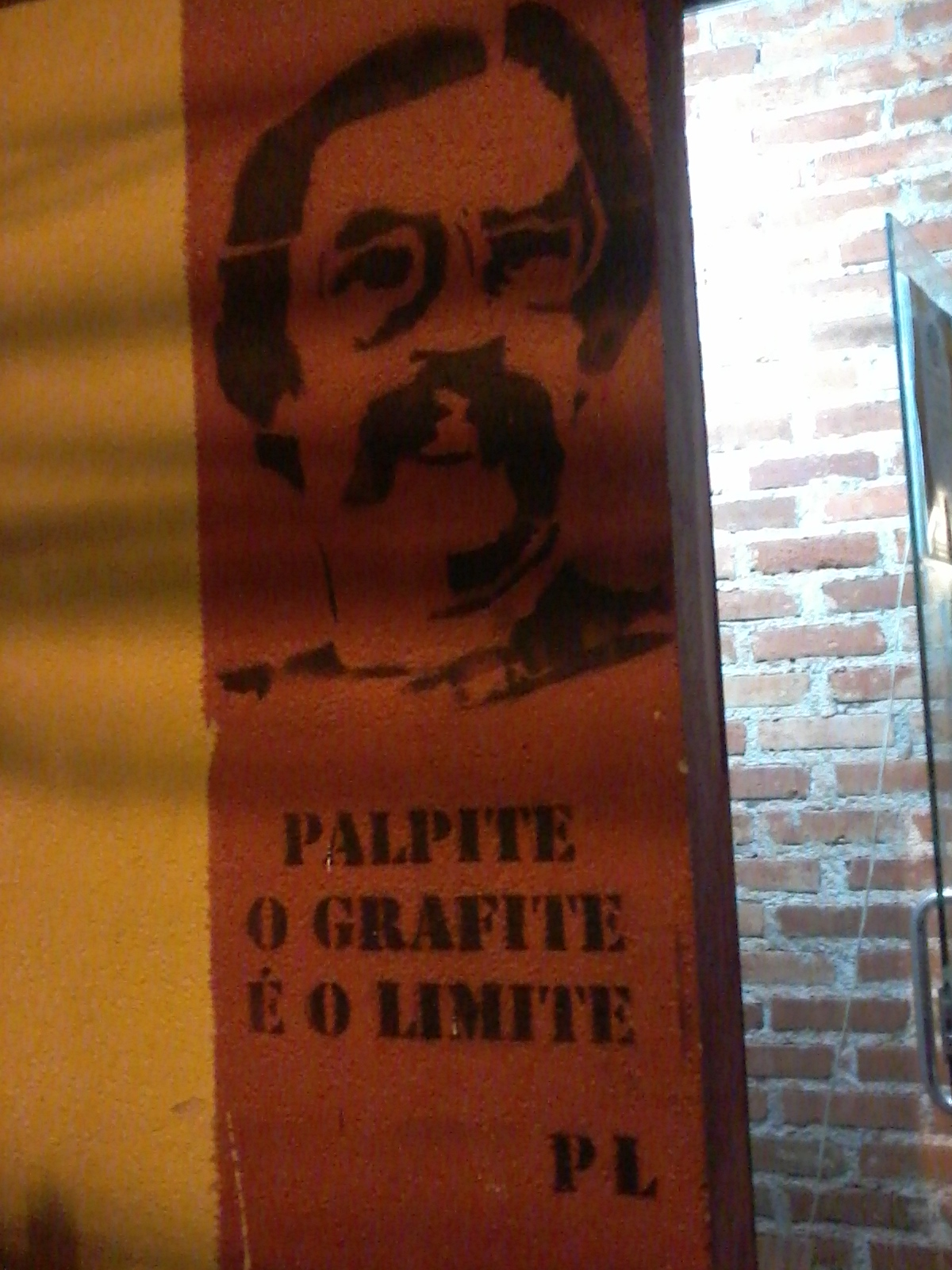
- A graffiti of Leminski in Curitiba
- Born: Paulo Leminski Filho; 24 August 1944; Curitiba, Paraná, Brazil
- Died: 7 June 1989 (aged 44); Curitiba, Paraná, Brazil
- Occupations: Writer; poet; translator; journalist; advertising professional; songwriter; literary critic; biographer; teacher; judoka
- Notable work: All Poetry, Catatau
- Spouses: Neiva Maria de Sousa (m. 1963; div. 1968); Alice Ruiz (m. 1968; div. 1987)
- Children: Incl. Estrela Leminski

Paulo Leminski Filho (Brazilian Portuguese: [ˈpawlu leˈmĩski ˈfiʎu]; Curitiba, 24 August 1944 — Curitiba, 7 June 1989) was a Brazilian writer, poet, musician, literary critic, journalist, advertising professional, translator, and professor. His poetry was distinctive because he developed a unique style, incorporating puns, playful adaptations of popular sayings, and influences from haiku, as well as slang and profanity. He was influenced by Japanese culture, particularly by the short, concise poetry of Matsuo Bashō's haiku—an author about whom Leminski wrote a biography. In addition to the Japanese influence on his poetry, Leminski was also a black belt in judo.

== Biography ==
=== Early years ===
Paulo Leminski Filho was born on 24 August 1944 in Curitiba. The son of Paulo Leminski and Áurea Pereira Mendes, his father was of Polish ancestry and his mother was the daughter of a Portuguese father and a Brazilian mother of African and Indigenous descent.

Leminski attended Colégio Estadual Dr. Caetano Munhoz da Rocha and Colégio Paranaense (Marist). In 1958, at the age of thirteen, he went to the Monastery of Saint Benedict (Mosteiro de São Bento) in São Paulo and stayed there for a little over a year. At the monastery, he acquired knowledge of Latin, theology, philosophy, and classical literature, and became enchanted by Gregorian chant. Leminski wanted to become a monk, against his father's wishes, as his father wanted him to pursue a military career. Leminski later abandoned his religious vocation. In Curitiba, he returned to Colégio Paranaense and later studied at Colégio Estadual do Paraná. He continued to immerse himself in literature, particularly Greek, Latin, French, and even Hebrew literature, through his study of the Bible.

Leminski married on 9 February 1963 the illustrator and visual artist Nevair "Neiva" Maria de Sousa, from whom he separated in 1968, although they were not officially divorced until 1976. He also enrolled in Law (Direito) and Language and Literature (Letras) degree programs but did not complete them. Still in 1963, he traveled to Belo Horizonte to participate in the National Week of Avant-Garde Poetry (Semana Nacional de Poesia de Vanguarda), where he met Haroldo de Campos—who would become a friend and collaborator—as well as Augusto de Campos and Décio Pignatari, the founders of the concrete poetry movement.

=== Early career ===
He made his literary debut in 1964 with four poems in the magazine Invenção, edited by Décio Pignatari in São Paulo, the leading voice of São Paulo's concrete poetry movement. In 1965, he became a teacher of literature, history, and writing in college preparatory courses, after leaving college without completing his studies. It was during one of these classes that he had the idea to write his first novel, Catatau. In 1966, he won first place in the Second Popular Modern Poetry Contest (II Concurso Popular de Poesia Moderna) sponsored by the newspaper O Estado do Paraná, receiving a prize of 80,000 cruzeiros. During this time, he began practicing judo, earning his black belt four years later. In 1967, he founded the Áporo Group, whose manifesto set out to combat the "cultural provincialism of Curitiba." In 1968, he entered the National Short Story Contest of Paraná (Concurso Nacional de Contos do Paraná) with a story titled Descartes com Lentes. Although he was a finalist in the contest, he did not win, which motivated him to expand the text, which would eventually become Catatau.

In 1968, he began a relationship with Alice Ruiz, who was also a poet. Leminski and Alice moved into a sort of "hippie" community. They stayed there for over a year and only left when their first of three children, Miguel Angelo, was born. From 1969 to 1970, he decided to live in Rio de Janeiro, working as a copy editor, translator, and writer for newspapers such as O Globo and O Pasquim, at the Reuters news agency, and for magazines, before returning to Curitiba to become a copywriter.

In the 1970s, he had poems and essays published in various magazines, such as Qorpo Estranho, Muda, and Raposa. In 1975, he published his daring Catatau, which he called an "idea-novel" (romance-ideia) and which took eight years to complete. It is an experimental novel, written in prose poetry, dealing with an imaginary visit of philosopher René Descartes to Brazil alongside Prince John Maurice of Nassau during the Dutch invasions of Brazil in the 17th century. In 1976, he published Quarenta Clics em Curitiba in collaboration with Jack Pires. A sort of photo book, it features 40 poems written by Leminski and 40 black-and-white photographs taken by Pires. In the late 1970s, at the Curitiba-based publishing house Grafipar, the couple Paulo Leminski and Alice Ruiz wrote scripts for erotic comic books, illustrated by artists such as Cláudio Seto, Julio Shimamoto, Flavio Colin, and Itamar Gonçalves.

=== 1980s ===
In 1980, at the request of friends, he published Não Fosse Isso e Era Menos / Não Fosse Tanto e Era Quase. That same year, he published Polonaises. It was these two books, together with other poems written later, that formed the collection Caprichos & Relaxos, published in 1983 by Brasiliense at the initiative of publisher Luiz Schwarcz.

Paulo Leminski was a scholar of Japanese language and culture (including Zen Buddhism), and in 1983 he published a biography of Matsuo Bashō (Matsuó Bashô: A Lágrima do Peixe), an author who influenced his haiku and from whom he translated several texts. In addition to the biography of Bashō, he also wrote, during the 1980s, biographies of Cruz e Sousa (Cruz e Sousa: O Negro Branco), Leon Trotsky (Leon Trotski: A Paixão Segundo a Revolução), and Jesus Christ (Jesus: a.C.), all figures who influenced Leminski in some way. Originally published individually, the biographies were later compiled into a single volume titled Vida.

Between 1983 and 1986, he translated works by Walt Whitman, John Fante, Lawrence Ferlinghetti, James Joyce, Alfred Jarry, Petronius, Yukio Mishima, John Lennon, and Samuel Beckett. In 1984, he published his second novel, Agora É que São Elas.

In 1985, he published Hai Tropikai, in collaboration with Alice Ruiz. In 1987, he published his final biography, Leon Trotski; his last translation, Fogo e Água na Terra dos Deuses; and the collection of essays Anseios Crípticos. Shortly thereafter, he published his final work of poetry while still alive, Distraídos Venceremos. He also published the children's book Guerra Dentro da Gente. Between 1988 and 1989, in São Paulo, he was a columnist for Jornal de Vanguarda on Rede Bandeirantes. In April 1989, back in Curitiba, he made his debut as a columnist for Folha de Londrina.

=== Death and posthumous publications ===
He died on 7 June 1989 from complications of liver cirrhosis, which he had suffered from for several years.

In the year of his death, the second edition of Catatau and the children's poetry collection A Lua no Cinema were published. In 1991, La Vie en Close, containing previously unpublished poems, was published posthumously. Other posthumously published poetry collections featuring previously unpublished material include Winterverno, co-authored with João Suplicy and published in 1994; Metaformose: Uma Viagem pelo Imaginário Grego, published in 1994 and awarded in the 1995 Jabuti Prize for Poetry; and O Ex-Estranho, published in 1996 and edited by Alice Ruiz and Aurea Leminski. In 2004, Gozo Fabuloso, a book of short stories and chronicles, was published.

In 2013, the collection of his complete poetry, Toda Poesia, edited by Alice Ruiz, became a bestseller for the publisher Companhia das Letras and cemented the poet's importance in Brazilian literature. It was translated into English in 2022 as All Poetry.

== Personal life ==
=== Family ===
From 1968 to 1987, he lived with fellow poet Alice Ruiz, who organized his work after his death. With her, he had three children: Miguel Angelo Leminski (1969–1979), who died at the age of ten from lymphoma; Aurea Alice Leminski (1971); and Estrela Ruiz Leminski (1981).

=== Politics ===
Leminski was a Trotskyist and close to the Internationalist Socialist Organization (Organização Socialista Internacionalista), a group that was operating underground due to repression by the Brazilian military dictatorship.

== Work ==
Leminski devised his own style of writing poetry, favoring short poems and often incorporating haiku, puns, wordplay based on popular sayings, and the use of slang and profanity. His work also features avant-garde elements, such as the absence of punctuation and capital letters, the geometric arrangement of words on the page, and the use of neologisms and portmanteaus. Another characteristic of his work is its visual nature, achieved through the use of different fonts and font sizes, as well as layout techniques. Despite this, Leminski also employed elements of traditional poetry, such as rhymes—often unconventional ones.

Among his activities, he developed skills as a lyricist and composer. He learned his first chords from his brother, Pedro Leminski Neto, and continued to create and compose as a self-taught musician. Leminski had several musical collaborators during his lifetime, including Moraes Moreira, Itamar Assumpção, José Miguel Wisnik, Guilherme Arantes, and Paulinho Boca de Cantor, among others. His compositions have been recorded by artists such as Caetano Veloso, Ney Matogrosso, Zizi Possi, Zélia Duncan, and Arnaldo Antunes.

== List of works ==
This is a list of Paulo Leminski's works:

=== Poetry ===
- Quarenta Clics em Curitiba (1976), in collaboration with Jack Pires
- Não Fosse Isso e Era Menos / Não Fosse Tanto e Era Quase (1980)
- Polonaises (1980)
- Caprichos & Relaxos (1983)
- Hai Tropikai (1985), in collaboration with Alice Ruiz
- Distraídos Venceremos (1987)
- La Vie en Close (1991)
- Winterverno (1994), in collaboration with João Suplicy
- Metaformose (1994)
- O Ex-Estranho (1996)
- Toda Poesia (2013), complete collection of Leminski's poetry; translated into English by Charles A. Perrone and Ivan Justen Santana as All Poetry (2022)

=== Novels ===
- Catatau (1975)
- Agora É que São Elas (1984)

=== Biographies ===
- Cruz e Sousa (1983), about Cruz e Sousa
- Matsuó Bashô (1983), about Matsuo Bashō
- Jesus (1984), about Jesus Christ
- Leon Trotski (1986), about Leon Trotsky
- Vida (1990), complete collection of Leminski's biographies

=== Children's literature ===
- Guerra Dentro da Gente (1988)
- A Lua no Cinema (1989)

=== Essays ===
- Anseios Crípticos (1986)

=== Short stories ===
- Gozo Fabuloso (2004)

=== Translations ===
- Folhas das Folhas da Relva (1983), translated from Leaves of Grass by Walt Whitman
- Pergunte ao Pó (1984), translated from Ask the Dust by John Fante
- Vida Sem Fim (1984), translated from selected poetry by Lawrence Ferlinghetti
- Giacomo Joyce (1984), translated from Giacomo Joyce by James Joyce
- O Supermacho (1985), translated from Supermale by Alfred Jarry
- Satyricon (1985), translated from Satyricon by Petronius
- Sol e Aço (1985), translated from Sun and Steel by Yukio Mishima
- Um Atrapalho no Trabalho (1985), translated from In His Own Write and A Spaniard in the Works by John Lennon
- Malone Morre (1986), translated from Malone Dies by Samuel Beckett
- Fogo e Água na Terra dos Deuses (1987), translated from Ancient Egyptian poetry
