= Iara Rennó =

Brazilian singer-songwriter (born 1977)

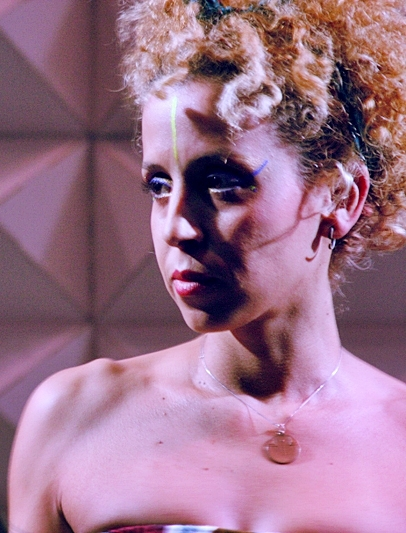
- Rennó in 2011
- Born: 4 March 1977 (age 49); São Paulo, Brazil
- Occupation: singer
- Years active: 1998–present
- Musical career
- Genres: MPB

Iara Espíndola Rennó (born 4 March 1977) is a Brazilian singer-songwriter and record producer.

== Early life ==
Born in São Paulo, Rennó is the daughter of journalist and lyricist Carlos Rennó and singer-songwriter Alzira Espíndola. She studied letters at the University of São Paulo.

== Career ==
Rennó began her career as a backing vocalist with her mother, and in 1998 she joined the Itamar Assumpção's backup band. In 2001, she left the band to form the trio DonaZica with Andreia Dias and Anelis Assumpção.

In 2008, Rennó made her solo debut with Macunaíma Ópera Tupi, a concept album dedicated to writer Mário de Andrade which features collaborations with Tom Zé, Arrigo Barnabé, Moreno Veloso and Siba, among others. In 2010, the album was adapted in a stage musical, Toxico. In 2022, she released a concept album about the Yoruba culture, Oríki, which features vocal contributions by MBP artists including Tulipa Ruiz, Lucas Santtana, Curumin, Criolo, Anelis Assumpção, Thalma de Freitas and Carlinhos Brown, and was nominated for Best Portuguese Language Roots Album at the 23rd Annual Latin Grammy Awards.

Rennó is also active as a songwriter for other artists, notably Ney Matogrosso, Elza Soares, Gaby Amarantos, Maria João, and Ava Rocha. She is also a poet.

== Discography ==
with DonaZica

- 2003 - Composição
- 2005 - Filme brasileiro

Solo albums

- 2008 - Macunaíma Ópera Tupi
- 2013 - I A R A
- 2016 - Arco
- 2016 - Flecha
- 2020 - AfrodisíacA
- 2021 - Pra Te Abraçar
- 2022 - Oríkì
- 2023 - Orí Okàn
