= Baumstein =

Baumstein is a German surname. Notable people with the surname include:

- Moysés Baumstein (1931–1991), Brazilian artist

Fictional characters:

- Lina Baumstein and Max Baumstein, in the 1982 film The Passerby
