= Nas Portas do Cu =

Studio album by Rogério Skylab
- Released: January 1, 2019
- Recorded: 2018
- Studio: Centro Municipal de Referência da Música Carioca Artur da Távola, Estúdio Hi-Eight
- Genre: Experimental rock; art rock; MPB
- Length: 1:05:08
- Label: Self-released
- Producer: Rogério Skylab

Rogério Skylab chronology
Skylab & Tragtenberg, Vol. 3 (2018)	Nas Portas do Cu (2019)	Crítica da Faculdade do Cu (2019)

Professional ratings
Review scores
Source	Rating
Revista Esquinas	Favorable link

Nas Portas do Cu (Portuguese for "At the Doors of the Ass") is the fourteenth studio album by the Brazilian musician Rogério Skylab, and the second installment of a trilogy, the "Trilogia do Cu" ("Trilogy of the Ass"). It was released on January 1, 2019, and is available for free download on the musician's official website and for streaming.

The album and the trilogy it is part of as a whole were originally announced by Skylab on his official Facebook page on March 7, 2018. On a later post, from December 3, he stated that production of Nas Portas do Cu was "nearing completion" and that it would be released on January 1 of the following year. Lívio Tragtenberg, who collaborated with Skylab on the Skylab & Tragtenberg trilogy of albums, contributed with Nas Portas do Cu by pre-mixing the album and providing the samples.

The track "Catatau" is a reference to the eponymous experimental novel by Paulo Leminski, originally published in 1975.

== Critical reception ==
Writing for webzine Esquinas, owned by the Cásper Líbero Foundation, Henrique Artuni spoke very favorably of Nas Portas do Cu, calling it an album "whose greatness can be compared to Skylab VII, Skylab X and Skygirls". He also praised Skylab as a "chameleonic artist", and noted how he and his music visibly "matured" over time.

== Track listing ==
All tracks are written by Rogério Skylab

No.	Title	English title	Length
1.	"Nas Canções de Amor"	In Love Songs	9:19
2.	"Sertão"		3:18
3.	"A Voz do Cu"	The Voice of the Ass	4:17
4.	"Nas Portas do Cu"	At the Doors of the Ass	5:46
5.	"Capa Negra"	Black Cape	5:09
6.	"O Amor Tem Razões"	Love Has Its Reasons	4:20
7.	"Sem Freio"	Without Brakes	4:53
8.	"Um Anjo Torto"	A Warped Angel	4:17
9.	"Catatau"		3:58
10.	"Tarde pra Negar"	Too Late to Deny	5:52
11.	"Venham, Saturno, Júpiter..."	Come, Saturn, Jupiter...	3:28
12.	"Eu Vou Botar Silicone na Bunda"	I'll Inject Silicone in My Butt	6:56
13.	"Você Sabe que É pra Sempre"	You Know It's Forever	3:50

== Personnel ==
- Rogério Skylab – vocals, production
- Thiago Martins – electric guitar, classical guitar
- Yves Aworet – bass guitar
- Alex Curi – drums
- Lívio Tragtenberg – pre-mixing, sampling
- Vânius Marques – mixing, mastering
- Solange Venturi – cover art
