= Tem Mas Acabou =

Studio album by Pato Fu
- Released: June 28, 1996
- Recorded: 1995–1996
- Genres: Alternative rock, indie pop, experimental
- Length: 54:00
- Languages: Portuguese, english, spanish
- Label: Plug/BMG
- Producer: André Abujamra

Pato Fu chronology
Gol de Quem? (1995)	Tem Mas Acabou (1996)	Televisão de Cachorro (1998)

Professional ratings
Review scores
Source	Rating
Allmusic	4/5 stars

Tem Mas Acabou is the third studio album of the Brazilian rock band Pato Fu. Tem Mas Acabou tries to change the pop sound that gave them their hit "Sobre o Tempo". The hit "Pinga" tries to establish a Brazilian atmosphere through the lyrics, even if the instrumental backing is a blend of rock and reggae. Incidental radio noise introduces a peculiar piece with Brazilian imagery (the small portable radios used by humble people to listen soccer games). "O Peso das Coisas" and "Porque te Vas" (an Attaque 77 cover) also have hit potential—the first with its tender melodic line, delivered with simplicity by Fernanda Takai, and the latter is a version for the theme song to Carlos Saura's film Cría cuervos. The group, formed by light-hearted youngsters with no professional approach to music and much humor, has made a well-produced album. This one was produced by André Abujamra (from Karnak), who supplies the needed resources.

== Track listing ==
All songs written by John Ulhoa, except where noted.

1. "Nós Mês" (Oursel's) (Ulhoa/Bob Faria) – 1:10
2. "Água" (Water) – 4:08
3. "Pinga" (slang for cachaça) – 3:38
4. "Capetão 66.6 FM" (Big Devil 66.6 FM) (Ulhoa/André Abujamra) – 4:19
5. "O Peso das Coisas" (The Weight of Things) – 3:29
6. "Tchau to Indo Já Fui" (Good Bye I'm Going I'm Gone) (Ricardo Koctus) – 2:54
7. "Céreblo" (Bwain) – 3:38
8. "Nuvens" (Clouds) (Fernanda Takai) – 2:14
9. "Little Mother of Sky" – 3:23
10. "Porque Te Vas" (Because You're Leaving) (José Luiz Perales) – 3:08
11. "1 de Vocês" (1 of You) – 2:58
12. "Lá Se Vai" (There It Goes) – 2:57
13. "Dentro/Fora" (In/Out) (Koctus) – 1:45
14. "Feliz Ano Novo" (Koctus) – 14:20
  - Ends at 2:51, a hidden track entitled "Secretária Eletrônica" starts at 2:55, and a skit called "A história do Capitão Oréia" starts at 13:27

== Personnel ==
Pato Fu

- Fernanda Takai - lead vocals (3, 5, 8, 10, 12, 13), acoustic guitar (3, 11, 12), electric guitar (2, 4, 6, 9, 14), background vocals (1, 6, 9)
- John Ulhoa - lead vocals (2, 4, 6, 7, 9, 11, 14), acoustic guitar (on "Nós Mês", "Água" and "O Peso das Coisas"), electric guitar (all except tracks 1 and 2), background vocals (1, 3, 8, 10, 13), programming (all but 9)
- Ricardo Koctus - bass, background vocals (1, 2, 3, 7, 9)
- Xande Tamietti - drums, handclaps (on "Pinga")

Additional musicians

- Nico Nicolaiewsky - accordion on "Água" and "Feliz Ano Novo"
- Hique Gomez - violin on "Água" and "Feliz Ano Novo"
- André Abujamra - handclaps on "Pinga", bridge vocal on "Capetao", bass drum on "Nuvens", piano on "Feliz Ano Novo"
- Ayrton Mugnaini Jr. - sampler from "Maneta" and "Homem da Minha Vida"
- Aluízer Malab - additional vocals on "Capetão"
- Karnak (André Abujamra, Carneiro Sândalo, Tiquinho, Hugo Hori, Marcos Bowie, Eduardo Cabelo, Sérgio Bartolo and Lulu Camargo) on "Capetão"
- Hugo Hori - saxophone on "O Peso das Coisas"
- Tiquinho - trombone on "O Peso das Coisas" and "Porque Te Vas"
- Marcelo Cotrelli, Marcos Bowie - trumpet on "O Peso das Coisas"

Production

- André Abujamra =- production, mixing
- Pato Fu - mixing
- Thiago Marques - mixing assistant
- Roberto Marques - mixing technician
- Marcos Eagle - mastering
- Dirceu and Ricardo Cheib - recording
