= Estrela Leminski =

Brazilian writer and poet

Estrela Ruiz Leminski
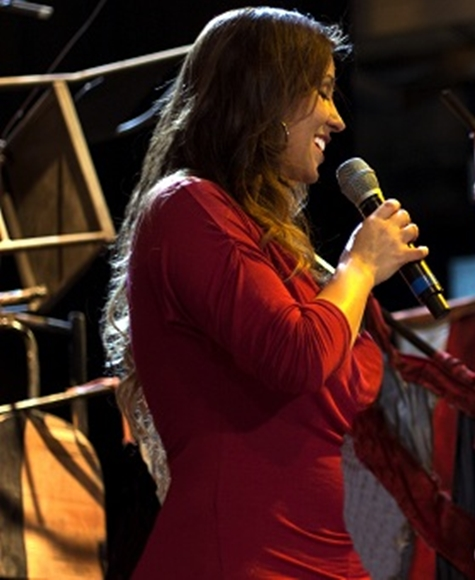
- Born: 1981 (age 44–45); Curitiba, Paraná, Brazil
- Occupations: Writer, poet, songwriter
- Parent(s): Paulo Leminski; Alice Ruiz

Estrela Ruiz Leminski (Curitiba, 1981) is a Brazilian writer and songwriter, daughter of poets Paulo Leminski and Alice Ruiz.

She graduated in Music Paraná School of Arts, specialized in Música Popular Brasileira and has a master's degree on Music and Musicology in Valladolid (Spain).

In 2014, she released the project Leminskanções, which revisits her father's songwriter side; according to her, he is mostly regarded as a poet.

== Partnership with Téo Ruiz ==
Leminski formed a duo with her husband Téo Ruiz named Estrela Leminski e Téo Ruiz. With him, she released three albums.

In 2017, they released the album Tudo Que Não Quero Falar Sobre Amor, produced by several people including Guilherme Kastrup, Dante Ozzetti, Rodrigo Lemos, Marcelo Fruet, Fred Teixeira, John Ulhoa (Pato Fu) and Pupillo (Nação Zumbi). The project involved, in total, over 100 people and contains a 12 songs. All of them received videos and were released one by one starting in April of that year. The "Novela das Seis" video starred Ruiz's sister, Guta Ruiz. The video for "Gostável" was debuted at Billboard Brasil's website.

In 2020, they released a protest-frevo for carnival named "Você Não Segurou o Samba".

== Bibliography ==
Per source.

- Cupido, cuspido, escarrado (2004)
- Contra-Indústria (2006; monograph)
- XXI poetas de hoje em dia(nte) (2009; compilation with several authors)
- Poesia é Não (2010)

== Discography ==
- Leminskanções (2014; organization and idealization)

=== With Estrela Leminsky e Téo Ruiz ===
- Músicas de Ruiz (2011)
- São Sons (2012)
- Tudo Que Não Quero Falar Sobre Amor (2017)

Compilations with other artists

- Reversos (by Nego Dito blog)
- Re-trato (with a cover of "A Outra", by Los Hermanos; Musicoteca website initiative)
