= Alice Ruiz =

Brazilian poet and translator (born 1946)

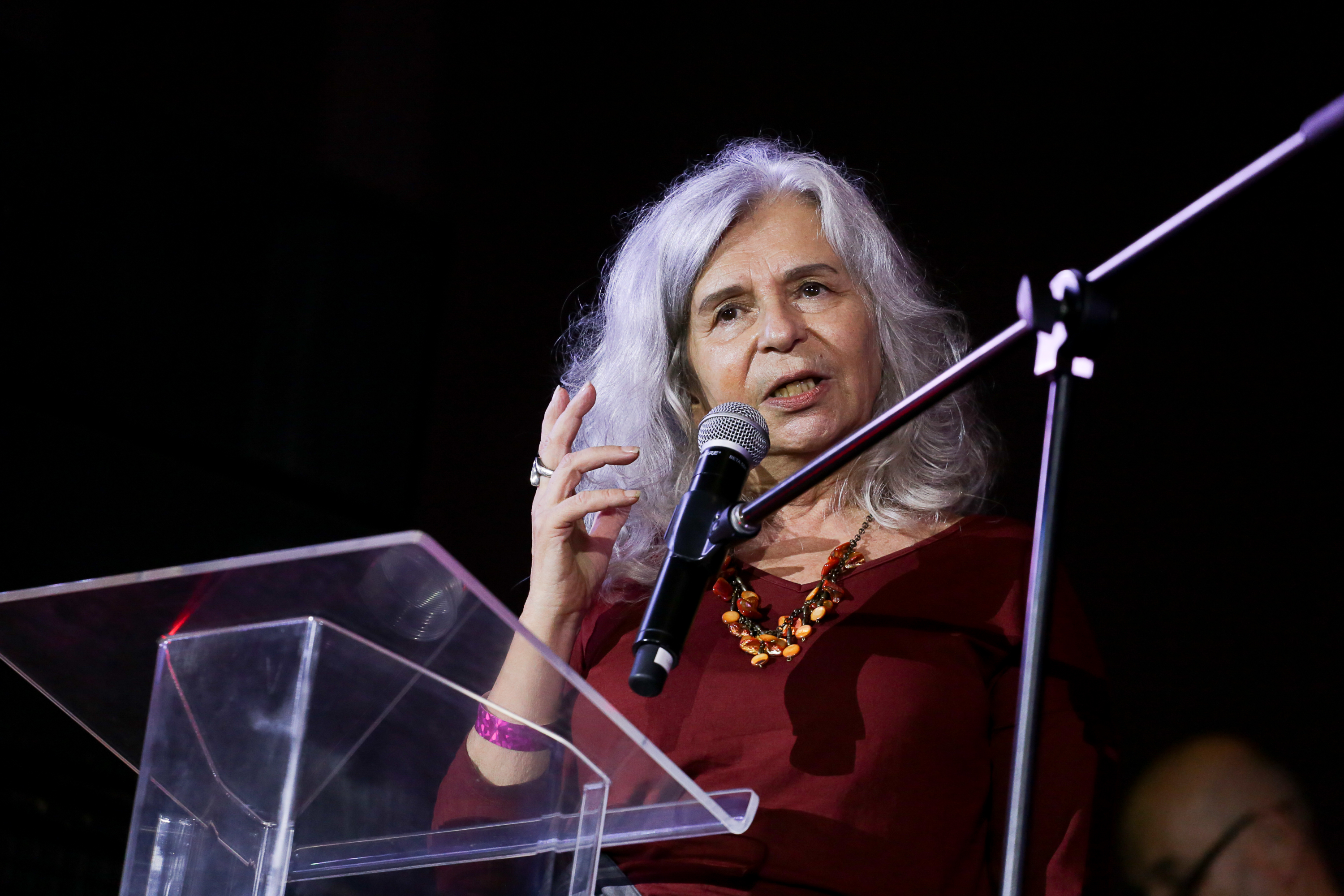
- Alice Ruiz in 2018
- Born: 26 January 1946 (age 80); Curitiba, Paraná, Brazil
- Occupations: poet, haiku writer, advertising professional, lyricist, and translator
- Notable work: Desorientais, Vice-Verso, Dois em Um
- Spouse: Paulo Leminski (m. 1968; div. 1987)
- Children: 3, including Estrela Leminski
- Website: www.aliceruiz.mpbnet.com.br

Alice Ruiz Schneronk (Curitiba, 22 January 1946) is a Brazilian poet, haiku writer, advertising professional, lyricist, and translator. She has published over 20 books, including collections of poetry, translations, and a children's book.

== Biography ==
Alice Ruiz Schneronk was born in Curitiba on 22 January 1946, the daughter of Siegfried Gotlieb Schneronk, a German national who was naturalized under the name Sezefredo, and Ângela Ruiz, a Spanish national.

She began writing at the age of nine. In 1962, at age 16, she published her first poems in newspapers and magazines. She also published feminist essays in magazines during that time. At the age of 22, Ruiz discovered haiku, a poetic form that would become central to her career.

In 1971, she began her career as a lyricist when she joined the musical group A Chave. In the late 1970s, at the Curitiba-based publishing house Grafipar, she wrote scripts for erotic comic books, illustrated by artists such as Cláudio Seto, Julio Shimamoto, Flavio Colin, and Itamar Gonçalves.

In 1980, she published her first book, Navalhanaliga. In 1981, she published her first translation, Dez Haiku, a collection of translated haiku. In 1987, she became creative director at an advertising agency. The Brazilian Japanese community bestowed on Ruiz the haiku pen name Yuuka in 1993.

In 2005, while continuing to write lyrics, she released the CD Paralelas with Alzira E. Over the course of her career, Ruiz has recorded more than 50 songs with various artists. Her compositions have been performed by artists such as Ney Matogrosso, Ná Ozzetti, Adriana Calcanhotto, Zélia Duncan, Itamar Assumpção, Elba Ramalho, and Wanderléa. In 2026, she was honored with the Tradições Trophy, awarded by the Brazilian Union of Composers.

Ruiz has published 21 books, including collections of poetry, translations, and a children's book. She was twice awarded the Jabuti Prize for Poetry: in 1989, for the book Vice-Versos, and in 2009, for the book Dois em Um.

Alice Ruiz's poetic development encompassed haiku, experimentation with concrete poetry, visual culture, and feminist writing that began in the 1970s. Ruiz helped popularize haiku in Brazil by adapting the form to Brazilian cultural contexts and translating haiku into Portuguese, as well as leading workshops on the subject.

Ruiz and fellow poet Paulo Leminski lived together from 1968 to 1987. They had three children: Miguel Angelo Leminski (1969–1979), who died at the age of ten from lymphoma; Aurea Alice Leminski (1971); and Estrela Ruiz Leminski (1981).

== Works ==
=== Books ===
- Navalhanaliga (1980)
- Paixão Xama Paixão (1983)
- Pelos Pêlos (1984)
- Hai Tropikai (1985)
- Rimagens (1985)
- Nuvem Feliz (1986)
- Vice-Versos (1988)
- Desorientais (1996)
- Haikais (1998)
- Poesia Pra Tocar no Rádio (1999)
- Yuuka (2004)
- Dois em Um (2008)
- Conversa de Passarinho (2008)
- Três Linhas (2009)
- Boa Companhia (2009)
- Nuvem Felix (2010)
- Jardim de Haijin (2010)
- Proesias (2010)
- Dois Haikais (2011)
- Estação dos Bichos (2011)
- Luminares (2012)

=== Translations ===
- Dez Haiku (1981)
- Céu de Outro Lugar (1985)
- Sendas da Sedução (1987)
- Issa (1988)

== Prizes ==
Year	Prize	Category	Work	Result
1989	Prêmio Jabuti	Poetry	Vice-Verso	Won
2009	Prêmio Jabuti	Poetry	Dois em Um	Won, 1st place
