= Vânia Bastos =

- Born: May 13, 1956 (age 70)
- Origin: Ourinhos, São Paulo, Brazil
- Occupation: Singer
- Instrument: Vocals
- Years active: 1975–present

Vânia Bastos (born May 13, 1956) is a Brazilian singer, who began her professional life with the Vanguarda Paulista avant-garde movement in the early 1980s.

== Biography ==
Bastos moved to São Paulo in 1975, to study sociology and singing. In 1980, she began her career as vocalist of Arrigo Barnabé's Sabor de Veneno band. She was the main soloist of Barnabé's 1983 album Tubarões Voadores, and participated in presentations and recordings with Itamar Assumpção, the other important name of the Vanguarda. She also recorded with Brazilian rock bands such as Magazine and Joelho de Porco. From 1986, she began to record her own works.

== Discography ==
| Title | Year | Record label | Media |
|---|---|---|---|
| Vânia Bastos | 1986 | Copacabana | LP |
| Eduardo Gudin & Vânia Bastos | 1989 | Eldorado | LP & CD |
| Vânia Bastos | 1990 | Eldorado | LP |
| Cantando Caetano | 1992 | Colúmbia | CD |
| Canta mais | 1994 | Velas | CD |
| Vânia Bastos & cordas. Canções de Tom Jobim | 1995 | Velas | CD |
| Diversões não eletrônicas | 1997 | Velas | CD |
| Belas feras | 1999 | PlayArte Music | CD |
| Vânia Bastos canta Clube da Esquina | 2002 | | CD |
