= Max B.O. =

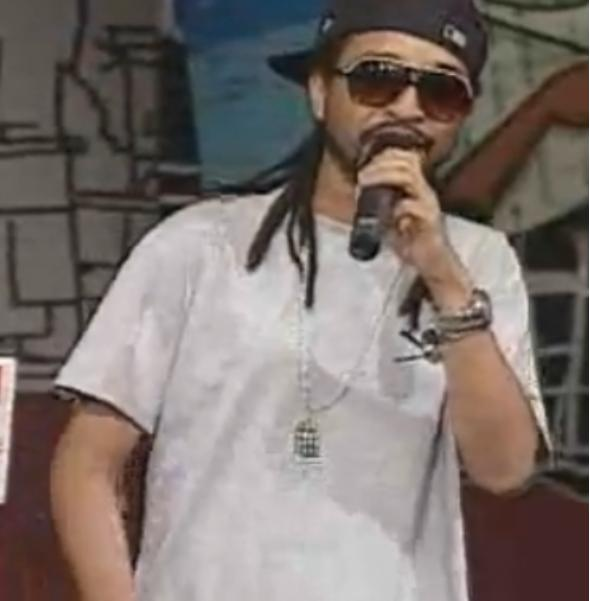

Background information
- Born: Marcelo Silva; 4 May 1979 (age 46); São Paulo, Brazil
- Genres: Hip hop
- Occupation: Rapper
- Years active: 1994–present (solo)
- Labels: Hostil Records

Max B.O. (born Marcelo Silva in São Paulo) is a Brazilian rapper. He gained national recognition as the host of "Manos e Minas", a hip-hop TV show on "TV Cultura", and is considered by many to be one of the leading freestyle artists in Brazil.

== Biography ==
Max B.O. began his musical journey in Jardim Peri Alto, a neighborhood in São Paulo, where he discovered his talent for rap and freestyle during his school years. He was a member of hip-hop groups such as Cartel SP and Boletim de Ocorrência, the latter being the first meaning behind the "B.O." in his name. In 1999, he left the group to pursue a solo career, adopting a new meaning for his alias: Brasil Original, which he continues to use today. Among his best-known tracks are "Tudo o que eu quiser", "Você", and "Fábrica de Rap". He also participated in the compilation Direto do Laboratório with the track "Se Joga", one of his most acclaimed songs. In 2004, Max B.O. won the "Liga dos MCs" Rap battle championship, defeating Aori in the final round. In 2005, he contributed to the project Iky’x Tape Vol. 1 (2004/2005) alongside members of the Brutal Crew and participants from the Batalha do Real.

He appeared in the Antônia film DVD with fellow rappers Kamau, Thaíde, Negra Li, and Leilah Moreno, also contributing to the movie’s soundtrack. Max has collaborated with prominent Brazilian artists such as Marcelo D2, Seu Jorge, Afrika Bambaataa, and bands like O Rappa and Nação Zumbi. With the group Estilo da Crítica, he released the music video "Poder do Som". He also coordinated several hip-hop festivals, including reeJazz Project, Skol Hip Hop Manifesta, Brasilintime, and Indie Hip Hop. In November 2010, he released the single "Transitando", produced by Cabes. Later that month, on November 29, he released his debut album Ensaio, o Disco, featuring 17 tracks. In 2015, he released the mixtape Fumasom. In 2008, Max B.O. joined the entertainment show Brothers, aired on RedeTV!, where he performed as the MC Rappórter, interviewing celebrities with improvised rhymes. His catchphrase “MC Rappórter na batida da cidade” ("MC Reporter on the city beat") made him well known across Brazil. In April 2010, he became the host of Manos e Minas on TV Cultura, replacing Thaíde. Although the show was canceled in August 2010 by João Sayad, then-president of the station, it returned after public pressure and support from the hip-hop community. Max continued as host, co-presenting alongside Anelis Assumpção. In March 2016, he announced his departure from the show after 7 years, 6 seasons, and over 200 episodes, following TV Cultura’s decision not to include him in the new season.

== Discography ==
=== Studio albums ===
- Ensaio, o Disco (2010)
- Antes que o Mundo Acabe (2012)
- Fumasom (2013/2014)
