= Fernanda Takai =

Brazilian singer (born 1971)

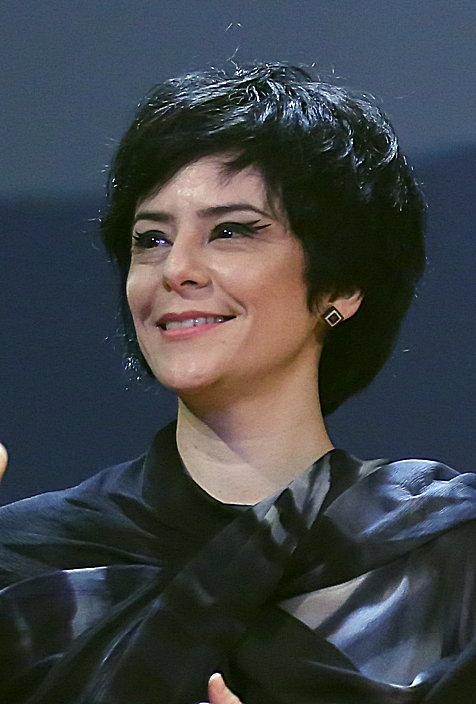
- Takai in 2015

Background information
- Born: Fernanda Barbosa Takai; 25 August 1971 (age 55)
- Origin: Serra do Navio, Amapá, Brazil
- Genres: Alternative rock; experimental rock; indie rock; art rock; MPB
- Occupations: Singer; songwriter; musician
- Instruments: Vocals; guitar
- Years active: 1988–present
- Labels: Rotomusic, BMG; Cogumelo (1992–2004); Sire (1982–1994)
- Member of: Pato Fu
- Website: Official website

Fernanda Barbosa Takai (Portuguese pronunciation: [feʁˈnɐ̃dɐ taˈkaj]; born 25 August 1971) is a Brazilian singer, better known as the lead vocalist and rhythm guitarist of rock band Pato Fu. She has also been working on a solo career since 2007.

In 2011, she collaborated with Atom™, Toshiyuki Yasuda and Moreno Veloso on the track "Águas de Março" for the Red Hot Organization's most recent charitable album Red Hot + Rio 2. The album is a follow-up to the 1996 Red Hot + Rio. Proceeds from the sales will be donated to raise awareness and money to fight AIDS/HIV and related health and social issues.

== Life and career ==
Born in Serra do Navio, Amapá, Takai was raised in Belo Horizonte, Minas Gerais. She is half Portuguese descent from her mother's side and half Japanese descent from her father's side. Since the year 2007, she's been working on a solo career, but hasn't left Pato Fu.

In 2021, her album Será Que Você Vai Acreditar? was nominated for the Latin Grammy Award for Best Portuguese Language Contemporary Pop Album.

== Discography ==
=== Pato Fu ===
- Rotomusic de Liquidificapum (1993)
- Gol de Quem? (1994)
- Tem Mas Acabou (1996)
- Televisão de Cachorro (1998)
- Isopor (1999)
- Ruído Rosa (2001)
- Toda Cura para Todo Mal (2005)
- Daqui Pro Futuro (2007)
- Música de Brinquedo (2010)
- Não Pare Pra Pensar (2014)

=== Solo ===
- Onde Brilhem os Olhos Seus (2007) (Brazil: 60,000)
- Luz Negra (2009) (Brazil: 20,000)
- Fundamental (2012) (with Andy Summers) (Brazil: 10,000)
- Na Medida do Impossível (2014) (Brazil: 10,000)
- O Tom da Takai (2018) (Brazil: 5,000)

=== Guest appearances ===
- Herbert Vianna – O Som do Sim (2000)
- Various – Um Barzinho, um Violão: Jovem Guarda (2005)
- Various – Renato Russo - Uma Celebração Multishow - Ao Vivo (2006)
- Clã – Cintura (album) (2007)
- Various – Um Barzinho, Um Violão - Novela 70 (2008)
- Projecto Fuga – 01 (2008)
