= Anelis Assumpção =

Brazilian singer-songwriter

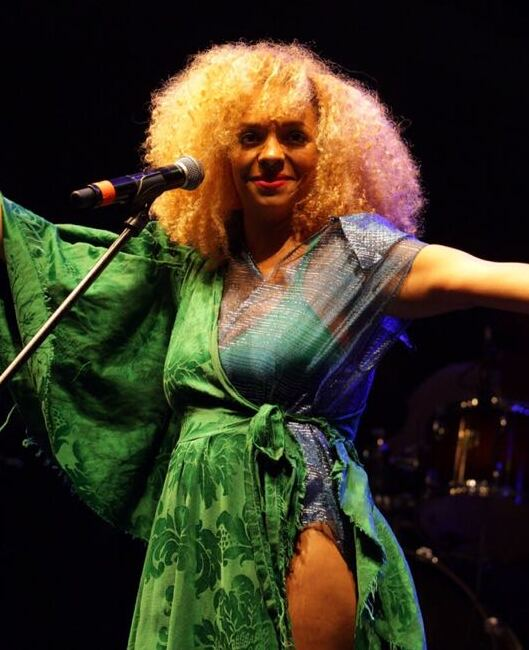
- Assumpção in 2018
- Born: 16 May 1980 (age 46); São Paulo, Brazil
- Occupation: Singer-songwriter

Anelis Assumpção (born 16 May 1980) is a Brazilian singer-songwriter.

== Life and career ==
Born in São Paulo, Anelis Assumpção is the daughter of Itamar Assumpção, one of the major figures of the Vanguarda Paulista; she began her career as a backing vocalist for her father, and in 2001 she formed the group DonaZica with Iara Rennó and Andreia Dias. She started her solo career in 2007.

In 2011, she recorded her first solo album, Sou Suspeita, Estou Sujeita, não Sou Santa, which features collaborations with Céu, Karina Buhr, Thalma de Freitas, Curumin and Beto Villares, among others. Céu and Thalma de Freitas returned to collaborate with Assumpção on her next two albums, which also feature guest appearances by João Donato, Tulipa Ruiz, Ava Rocha, Liniker, and Kiko Dinucci, among others.

Her album Taurina won the 2018 Multishow SuperJury Awards for Best Record and Best Cover, and was named 14th best Brazilian album of the year by the magazine Rolling Stone Brazil.

== Discography ==
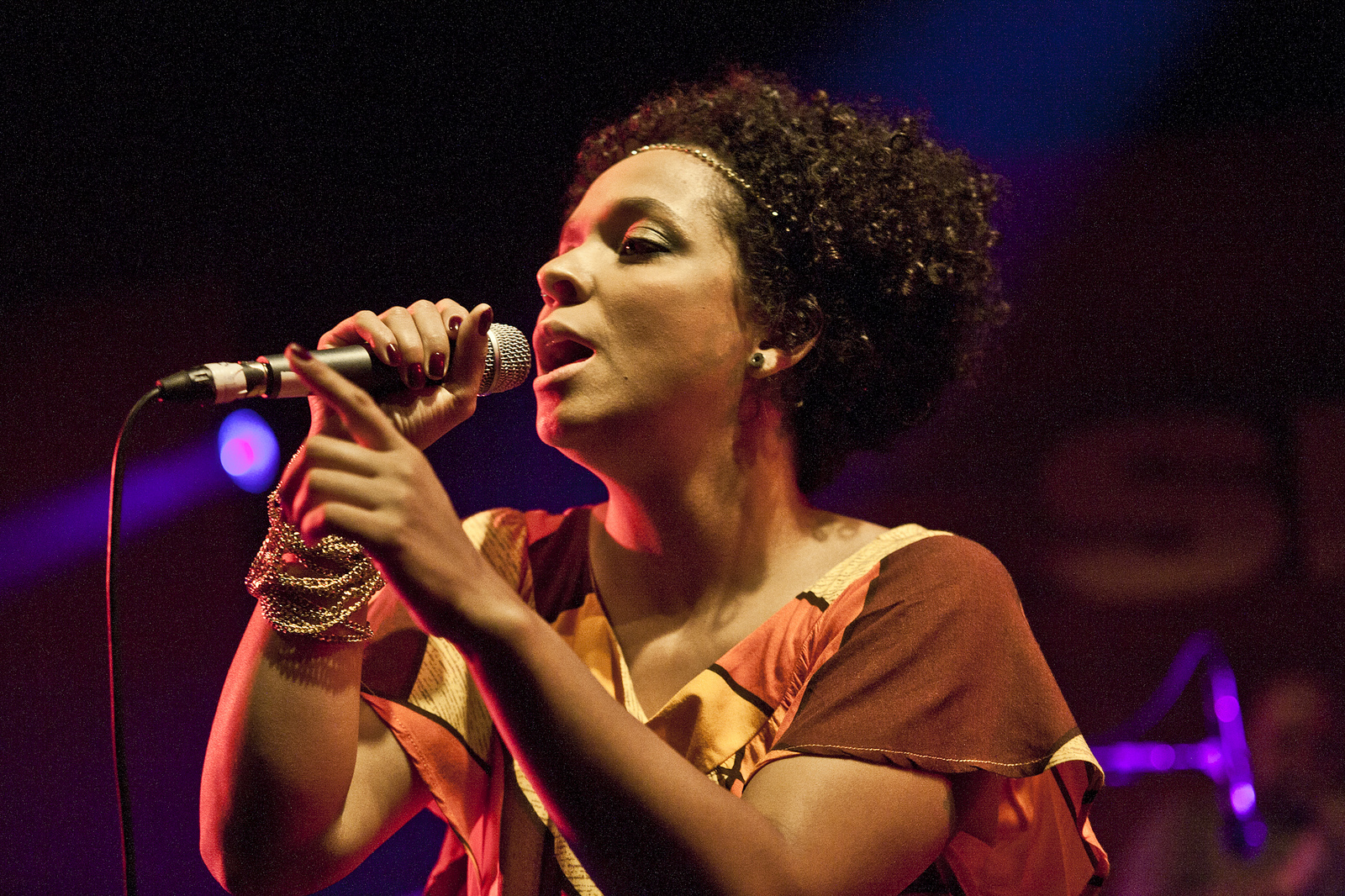
Assumpção in 2012

=== Studio albums ===
with DonaZica

- 2003 - Composição
- 2005 - Filme brasileiro

Solo albums

- 2011 - Sou Suspeita, Estou Sujeita, não Sou Santa
- 2014 - Anelis Assumpção e os Amigos Imaginários
- 2018 - Taurina
- 2023 - Sal
