= André Mehmari =

Brazilian pianist, composer and arranger (born 1977)

Andre Mehmari
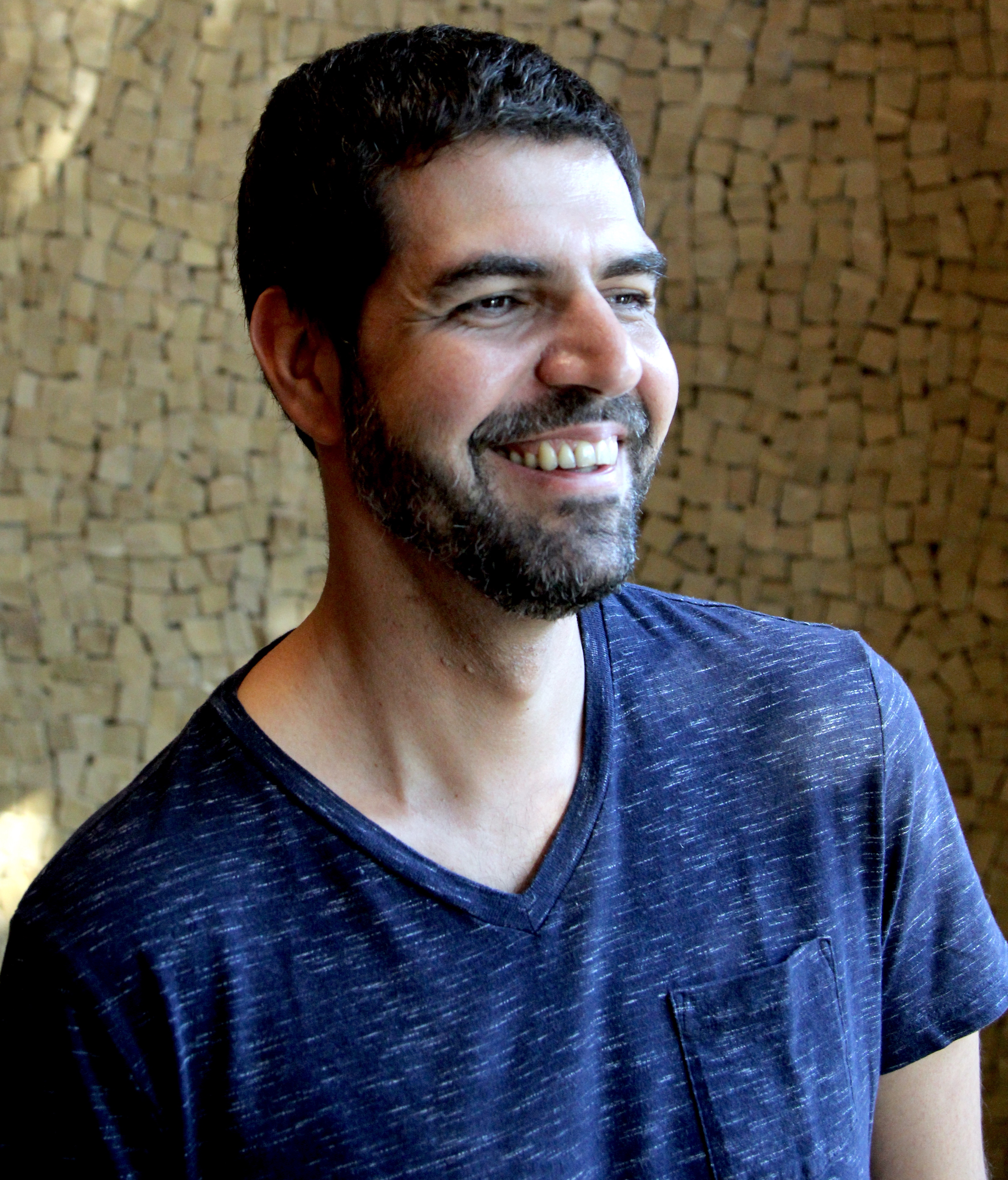

Background information
- Born: Andre Ricardo Mehmari; April 22, 1977 (age 49); Niterói, Rio de Janeiro, Brazil
- Occupations: pianist arranger composer

André Ricardo Mehmari (born April 22, 1977) is a Brazilian pianist, composer and arranger.

His works were played by the Orquestra Sinfônica do Estado de São Paulo (OSESP), Orquestra Petrobras Sinfônica and Orquestra Amazonas Filarmônica, among other Brazilian orchestras. In popular music, he played and recorded albums with the mandolinist Hamilton de Holanda and the singer Ná Ozzetti.

He likes playing improvisations since an early age. He has performed in all of Brazil's major jazz festivals and abroad at Umbria Jazz in Italy and Juan Les-Pins in France.

== Awards ==
- Prêmio Nascente (USP-Editora Abril) - category Popular Music-Composer (1995) and category Classical Music-Composer (1997).
- 1° Prêmio Visa de MPB Instrumental (1998).

== Discography ==
- (1998) Odisséia (with Célio Barros and Sérgio Reze) • PMC records
- (2000) Canto • Núcleo Contemporâneo
- (2001) Improvisos (with Célio Barros and Sérgio Reze)
- (2003) Lachrimae • CAVI Records
- (2004) Nonada (quintet with Proveta, Teco Cardoso, Tutty Moreno and Rodolfo Stroeter)
- (2005) MPBaby Internacional: Beatles (solo) - Vol. 10
- (2005) Piano e Voz (with Ná Ozzetti)
- (2007) Continua Amizade (with Hamilton de Holanda)
- (2007) DVD Piano e Voz (with Ná Ozzetti)
- (2008) MPBaby Clube da Esquina
- (2008) ...de árvores e valsas
- (2008) Miramari (with Gabriele Mirabassi)
- (2011) Gismontipascoal (with Hamilton de Holanda)
- (2011) Afetuoso • Selo Celeste (Japão)
- (2012) Canteiro
- (2012) Angelus
- (2013) Triz (with Sérgio Santos and Chico Pinheiro)
- (2013) Ouro Sobre Azul
- (2014) Tokyo Solo (piano solo)
- (2014) Miramari (DVD and CD)
- (2015) As Estações na Cantareira (with Neymar Dias and Sérgio Reze)
- (2016) Mehmari Loureiro duo (with Antonio Loureiro)
- (2017) Araporã com François Morin
- (2017) Serpentina com Juan Quintero e Carlos Aguirre
- (2017) Dorival com Tutty Moreno, Nailor Proveta e Rodolfo Stroeter
- (2017) Guris com Jovino Santos Neto
- (2017) Três no Samba com Eliane Faria e Gordinho do Surdo
- (2017) Esmê com Fabio Peron, Gian Correa e Fernando Amaro
- (2018) AM60AM40 com Antonio Meneses
- (2018) Suite Policarpo - Piano Solo
- (2018) Por Sete Vezes (balé)
- (2018-19) Rã com Alexandre Andres e Bernardo Maranhão
- (2019) Na Esquina do Clube com o Sol na Cabeça - Andre Mehmari Trio
- (2019) Música para Cordas
- (2019) Nosso Brasil (com Danilo Brito)
- (2020) Noël: Estrela da Manhã - piano solo
- (2020) Conversas com Bach (com Emmanuele Baldini)
- (2020) Música para Uns Tempos de Cólera
- (2020) Um Outro Adeus com Rafael Cesario
- (2020) Matéria de Improviso com Antônio Loureiro
- (2020-21) Notturno - piano solo
