= Ná Ozzetti =

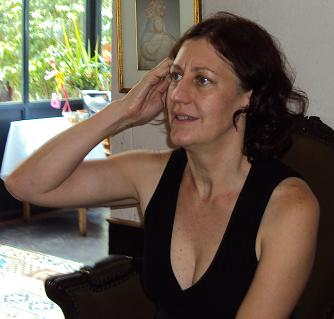
- Ná Ozzetti in December 2009, photo by Jacqueline Pires

Background information
- Born: 12 December 1958 (age 67); São Paulo, (SP), Brazil
- Genres: MPB
- Instruments: Vocal, piano
- Years active: 1979–present
- Labels: MCD, Som Livre, Biscoito Fino, Ná Records, Circus, YB
- Member of: Grupo Rumo
- Website: http://naozzetti.com.br

Maria Cristina Ozzetti, known as Ná Ozzetti, (born 12 December 1958) is a Brazilian singer and composer. She has been associated with the Vanguarda Paulista movement, having been a vocalist for the band Rumo before following a solo career.

== Biography ==
In her childhood, Ná Ozzetti learned to play the piano. After her graduation as a visual artist, she began her musical career as a singer of the group Rumo in the late 1970s, with whom she recorded a total of seven records. In 1988 her first album, Ná Ozzetti, was released. At the end of the 1980s, she was a member of Itamar Assumpção's ensemble on various tours in Europe. Her second album Ná was arranged to a large extent by her brother Dante Ozzetti. In 1996 her CD Love Lee Rita was released, a tribute to the Brazilian singer Rita Lee. With the pianist André Mehmari, she recorded Piano e Voz in 2005 in a duet. Her 2009 album, Balangandãs, includes compositions by Assis Valente, Ary Barroso and Dorival Caymmi. Ná Ozzetti received a number of awards in Brazil as a singer,

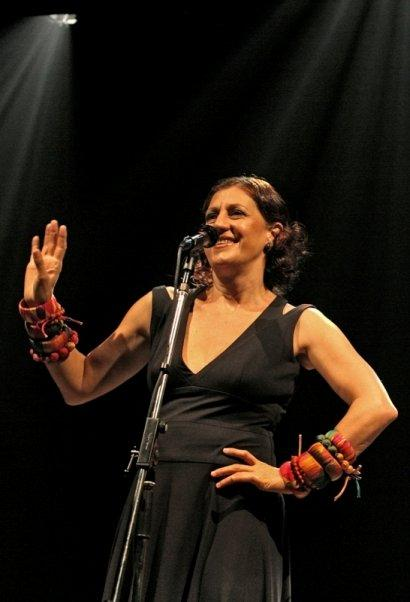
Ná Ozzetti, no show Balangandãs, 2009, foto de Rubens Chaves.

== Discography ==
- Ná Ozzetti, Warner Continental, 1988
- Ná, Ná Records, 1994
- Love Lee Rita (Canções de Rita Lee desde os Mutantes), Dabliu, 1996
- Estopim, Ná Records, 1999
- Show, Som Livre, 2001
- Piano e Voz (com André Mehmari), MCD, 2005
- DVD Piano e Voz (com André Mehmari), MCD, 2006
- Balangandãs, MCD, 2009
- Meu Quintal, Borandá, 2011
- Embalar, Circus Produções, 2013
- Ná e Zé, Circus Produções, 2015
- Thiago França, YB Produções, 2015

== Awards ==
- 1989 – Sharp Brazilian Music Awards – Best New Female Singer
- 2000 –Festival de Música Brasileira- Best interpretation (song Show", by Luiz Tatit and Fábio Tagliaferri.)
- 2005 – Prêmio Bravo! Prime de música e cultura (Best Popular CD, with Balangandãs)
- 2024 - São Paulo Art Critics Association (50 best albums of 2024 (unranked), with De Lua, a collaboration with Luiz Tatit)
