= Skylab & Tragtenberg, Vol. 2 =

Studio album by Rogério Skylab and Lívio Tragtenberg
- Released: December 20, 2016
- Genre: Experimental music; MPB; electronica; minimal music
- Length: 1:00:45
- Label: Self-released
- Producer: Rogério Skylab

Rogério Skylab chronology
Trilogia dos Carnavais: 25 Anos de Carreira ou de Lápide (2016)	Skylab & Tragtenberg, Vol. 2 (2016)	Skylab EP (2017)

Skylab & Tragtenberg, Vol. 2 is a collaborative album between Brazilian musicians Rogério Skylab and Lívio Tragtenberg. The second installment of a trilogy, it was self-released on December 20, 2016, and is available for digital download/streaming from digital retailers, as well as Skylab's official website.

"As Horas pela Alameda" is a poem by Fernando Pessoa set to music.

== Track listing ==
All lyrics are written by Rogério Skylab, except for "As Horas pela Alameda" by Fernando Pessoa; all music is composed by Lívio Tragtenberg

No.	Title	English title	Length
1.	"A Gente"	We	3:04
2.	"Refugiado" (instrumental)	Refugee	3:55
3.	"Ir, Ri"	Go, Laugh	5:18
4.	"Futebol de Cego"	Blind Man's Soccer	3:25
5.	"Escada de Frankfurt"	Frankfurt Staircase	2:45
6.	"No Meio"	In the Middle	1:56
7.	"Noite Tranquila"	Calm Night	4:22
8.	"As Horas pela Alameda"	The Hours Through the Avenue	3:09
9.	"Suruba Alienígena"	Alien Orgy	3:53
10.	"Assobio Transcendental" (instrumental)	Transcendental Whistle	2:28
11.	"Três Tristes Tigres"	Three Sad Tigers	2:20
12.	"Matador de Passarinho 2"	Bird Killer 2	3:20
13.	"Eu Não Moro em Lugar Nenhum"	I Live Nowhere	2:57
14.	"Nós Perdemos Todos os Amigos"	We Lost All Our Friends	4:30
15.	"Entre o Céu e o Mar"	Between the Sky and the Sea	3:33
16.	"Apocalipopótese"	Apocalyppopothesis	9:41

== Personnel ==
- Rogério Skylab – vocals, production
- Lívio Tragtenberg – bass clarinet, toy ukulele, programming, mixing, arrangements
- Thiago Martins – electric guitar, classical guitar
- Daniel Nakamura – mastering
- Carlos Mancuso – cover art
