= Moysés Baumstein =

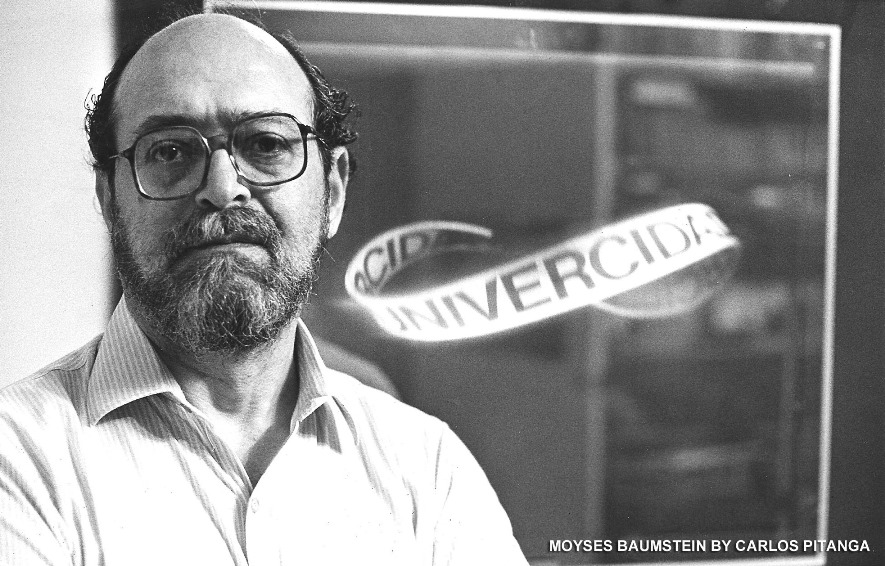
- Moyses BAUMSTEIN holograma
- Born: June 13, 1931; São Paulo
- Died: December 4, 1991 (aged 60); São Paulo
- Occupation: artist
- Writing career
- Language: Portuguese

Moysés Baumstein (June 13, 1931 – December 4, 1991) was a Brazilian artist. Baumstein worked in many fields: from literary creation to painting, from film making to holography. He was driven by singular curiosity and diligence and typified as a "Renaissance Man" joining science with art throughout his accomplishments.

Baumstein was born and died in São Paulo. He began his artistic career as a painter influenced by the Spanish painter Joan Ponç, with whom he founded the group “L´Espai” in São Paulo in 1960. He later became interested in photography, cinema and theatre, at the beginning of the seventies began to write experimental fiction and produce and direct animation cinema in Super8 and 16mm. In 1981 founded Videcom, a video production house in São Paulo directed for corporate and cultural audiovisual productions.

It was not until 1982 that he began to work in holography, using artisanal methods. He completed and perfected his technique in 1983 after a holography workshop with the German artist Dieter Jung (artist). In the same year he had his first holographic exhibition at the Museu da Imagem e do Som (MIS) in São Paulo. In 1984 he developed a specific holographic technique for chromatic control and began the regular production of technically very elaborate works. At that time in his holographic studio he began the production of commercial holograms as well as artistic works.

In some of his projects in this field he worked in collaboration with other Brazilian artists and poets interested in holography (Augusto de Campos, Décio Pignatari, Julio Plaza and José Wagner Garcia). The results of such collaboration were shown in exhibitions in Brazil such as the “Triluz” exhibition (1986) in the Museu da Imagem e do Som, and at the “Idehologia” exhibition (1987) in the Museu de Arte Contemporânea, both in São Paulo, and also abroad in Spain and Portugal at the Calouste Gulbekian Foundation (Triluz Portugal) amongst others. With José Wagner Garcia he created the prototype of a holographic cinema projector a "Holographic Kinetoscope".

A year after his death a retrospective of his cinema and video works was held at the 9th International “Videobrasil” Festival - 1992 in São Paulo.

Holographic poems by Augusto de Campos and produced by Baumstein were purchased by the "Centre Régional des Lettres de Basse-Normandie" in France and in 2007, the holographic poem REVER was exhibited at the exhibition "Concrete Poetry - O Projeto Verbivocovisual" in Tomie Ohtake Institute (São Paulo) and at the Palácio das Artes (Belo Horizonte).

Videcom kept the activities of his holographic laboratory until 2007 when all the equipment was donated to the Optical Lab from the University of Campinas Physics Institute under the responsibility of Prof. Jose Lunazzi.

Between September and November 2010 his holograms were presented at the exhibition "TEKHNE" (Tekhne page in English/Portuguese and Spanish) at Fundação Armando Alvares Penteado (FAAP) in São Paulo, which introduced the discussion of the importance of the convergence between art and technology.
