= Matador de Passarinho =

1999 song by Rogério Skylab

Song by Rogério Skylab

from the album Skylab
- Released: 1999
- Recorded: 1999
- Genre: Samba rock, experimental rock, MPB
- Length: 2:33
- Label: Self-released
- Songwriter: Rogério Skylab
- Producer: Robertinho do Recife

"Matador de Passarinho" (Portuguese for "Bird Killer") is a song written, composed and performed by the Brazilian musician Rogério Skylab, and originally included on his second studio album, Skylab, from 1999. In an interview Skylab explained that the song is a "distortion" of "Passaredo", a composition by Francis Hime and Chico Buarque:

"Matador de Passarinho" had its genesis in a song by Francis Hime and Chico Buarque, "Passaredo", whose lyrics I have distorted. It's a work of distortion, connected to [the act of] transvestism. This is the idea of contemporary art: Nature's done for, the original idea's done for, all things are manipulated, all things are distorted.

Before appearing in recorded form, the song obtained fame after one of Skylab's appearances at Jô Soares' late-night talk show Jô Soares Onze e Meia in the mid-1990s, becoming one of the musician's greatest hits. Besides, the song is considered the greatest hit of the history of the Rio de Janeiro underground/independent music scene.

The song eventually gave its name to a talk show hosted by Skylab from 2012 to 2014 at Canal Brasil, in which he interviewed celebrities forgotten by the mainstream media.

In 2016 Skylab and Lívio Tragtenberg wrote a sequel to the song, "Matador de Passarinho 2". It was included on the duo's second collaborative album, Skylab & Tragtenberg, Vol. 2.

== References in popular culture ==
The song is mentioned on page 157 of Wallace Fauth's book amortebeijoparasempre (Editora Baraúna, 2008, ISBN 8560832165). In the excerpt, the author says: "I turned up the music's volume to the max and began to listen to Rogério Skylab's 'Matador de Passarinho'".
