= Ruído Rosa =

Studio album by Pato Fu
- Released: March 29, 2001 (BR)
- Recorded: 2001
- Genres: Alternative rock, indie pop
- Label: Sony BMG

Pato Fu chronology
Isopor (1999)	Ruído Rosa (2001)	Toda Cura para Todo Mal (2005)

Professional ratings
Review scores
Source	Rating
Allmusic	4.5/5 stars

Ruído Rosa is the sixth album of the Brazilian rock band Pato Fu.

== Track listing ==
1. Eu (I)
2. Ninguém (Nobody)
3. Day After Day
4. Tribunal de Causas Realmente Pequenas (Really Small Claims Court)
5. Menti Pra Você, Mas Foi Sem Querer (I Lied to You, But I Didn't Mean to)
6. Ruído Rosa (Pink Noise)
7. Deus (God)
8. 2 Malucos (2 Nutjobs)
9. Tolices (Foolish Things)
10. Que Fragilidade (Such Fragility)
11. E O Vento Levou... (Gone with the Wind...)
12. Sorria, Você Está Sendo Filmado (Smile, You're on Camera)
13. Ando Meio Desligado (I Feel a Little Spaced Out) (Os Mutantes cover)

== Personnel ==
Pato Fu

- Fernanda Takai – lead (all but 12) and background vocals (1, 3, 6, 12), acoustic and electric guitars; harmonica (11)
- John Ulhoa – vocals (5, 7, 8, 9 and 10; lead on "Sorria. Você Está Sendo Filmado"), electric and acoustic guitars, keyboards, programming; synth and theremin (1), electronic bass (4, 9), toy piano (9); post-production, recording (at home)
- Ricardo Koctus – bass, background vocals
- Xande Tamietti – drums; background vocals (5), pandeiro (8), loops (11)

Additional musicians

- Dudu Marote - electronic bass (1), Fender Rhodes piano (6)
- André Abujamra (Os Mulheres Negras) - vocals and electric guitar on "Day After Day"
- Maurício Pereira - vocals, soprano and tenor saxophone on "Day After Day"

Production

- Dudu Marote - production
- Clive Goddard - mixing at Strongroom, London (all except 3, 4, 6, 10 and 13)
- Rogério Pereira - mixing at Dr. Dd Eletromúsica, São Paulo (3, 4, 6, 10 and 13), recording at Dr. Dd Eletromúsica
- Stuart Hawkes - mastering at Metropolis, London
- Patrick McGovern - studio assistant at Strongroom
- Carlos Blau - studio assistant at Dr. Dd
