= Rotomusic de Liquidificapum =

Studio album by Pato Fu
- Released: 1993 (BR)
- Recorded: 1992
- Genre: Alternative rock, experimental, grunge
- Length: 47:16
- Language: Portuguese, english
- Label: Cogumelo
- Producer: John Ulhoa e Haroldo Ferretti

Pato Fu chronology
Rotomusic de Liquidificapum (1993)	Gol de Quem? (1995)

Rotomusic de Liquidificapum is the first album of the Brazilian rock band Pato Fu. It was released in 1993.

== Tracks ==
All tracks are written by John Ulhoa, except where noted.

No.	Title	Writer(s)	Length
1.	"Rotomusic de Liquidificapum"	Fernanda Takai, Ulhoa	7:34
2.	"Sítio do Pica-Pau Amarelo"	Gilberto Gil	3:23
3.	"O Processo de Criação Vai de 10 Até 100 Mil (The Creative Process Goes from 10 to 100,000)"		4:12
4.	"Meu Coração É uma Privada (My Heart Is a Toilet)"		2:55
5.	"Minhas Férias (My Vacations)"		4:34
6.	"Meu Pai, Meu Irmão (My Father, My Brother)"		3:36
7.	"Hino Nacional do Pato Fu (Pato Fu National Anthem)"		1:16
8.	"G.R.E.S."	Rubinho Troll, Ulhoa	4:13
9.	"Gimme 30"		3:50
10.	"O Mundo Ainda Não Está Pronto (The World's Not Ready Yet)"	Troll, Ulhoa	6:13
11.	"Eu Sou o Umbigo do Mundo (I Am the World's Navel)"	Ricardo Koctus	3:37
12.	"Amor em Carne e Osso (Love in the Flesh)"		1:53
Total length:			47:16

== People ==
- Fernanda Takai - vocals (lead on "O Processo da Criação" and "O Amor em Carne e Osso")
- John Ulhoa - vocals, lead guitar; programming (Roland MC50)
- Ricardo Koctus - bass guitar, vocals
