= Gol de Quem? =

Studio album by Pato Fu
- Released: 29 April, 1997 (Brazil)
- Genre: Alternative rock, experimental
- Length: 45:53
- Language: Portuguese, English; French (in "Spoc")
- Label: PluG/BMG
- Producer: Carlos Savalla

Pato Fu chronology
Rotomusic de Liquidificapum (1993)	Gol de Quem? (1997)	Televisão de Cachorro (1998)

Professional ratings
Review scores
Source	Rating
Allmusic	3/5 stars

Gol de Quem? is the second studio album of the Brazilian rock band Pato Fu. The album utilizes elements of alternative and experimental rock, and was released on 29 April, 1997. It sold approximately 50,000 copies.

"Vida de Operário" is a cover of the Brazilian punk band Excomungados.

== Track listing ==
All tracks are written by John Ulhoa, except where noted.

No.	Title	Writer(s)	Lead vocals	Length
1.	"And Now"		Instrumental	1:42
2.	"Mamãe Ama É o Meu Revólver (Mama Loves My Revolver)"	Rubinho Troll	Fernanda Takai	3:30
3.	"Vida Imbecil (Dumb Life)"		Takai, Ulhoa	3:02
4.	"Gol de Quem? (Who Scored?)"	Ricardo Koctus, Ulhoa	Ulhoa	2:46
5.	"Sertões (Backlands)"	Koctus	Ulhoa	4:24
6.	"Onofle"		Ulhoa	4:28
7.	"Sobre o Tempo (About the Time)"		Takai	3:27
8.	"A Volta do Boêmio (The Bohemian Returns)"	Adelino Moreira	Ulhoa	4:32
9.	"Qualquer Bobagem (Any Stupid Thing)"	Os Mutantes, Tom Zé	Ulhoa	3:34
10.	"Ring My Bell"	Frederick Knight	Takai	3:16
11.	"Ok! All Right!"		Ulhoa	1:37
12.	"Vida de Operário (Blue-Collar Life)"	Falcão	Koctus, Takai, Ulhoa	4:15
13.	"Spoc"		Takai, Ulhoa	4:10
14.	"Ob-la-di-ob-lá-da"	Lennon–McCartney	Takai, Ulhoa	1:10
Total length:				45:53

== Personnel ==
- Fernanda Takai - lead vocals, acoustic guitar, arrangements
- John Ulhoa - lead guitar, vocals; programming (Roland MC50), acoustic guitar
- Ricardo Koctus - bass guitar, vocals

== Guest musicians ==
- Demétrio Bezerra - trumpet
- Eduardo Lyra - percussion
- José Milton - vocals
- João Lira - acoustic guitar
- Xadia Polidro - talking
