= Teatro Lira Paulistana =

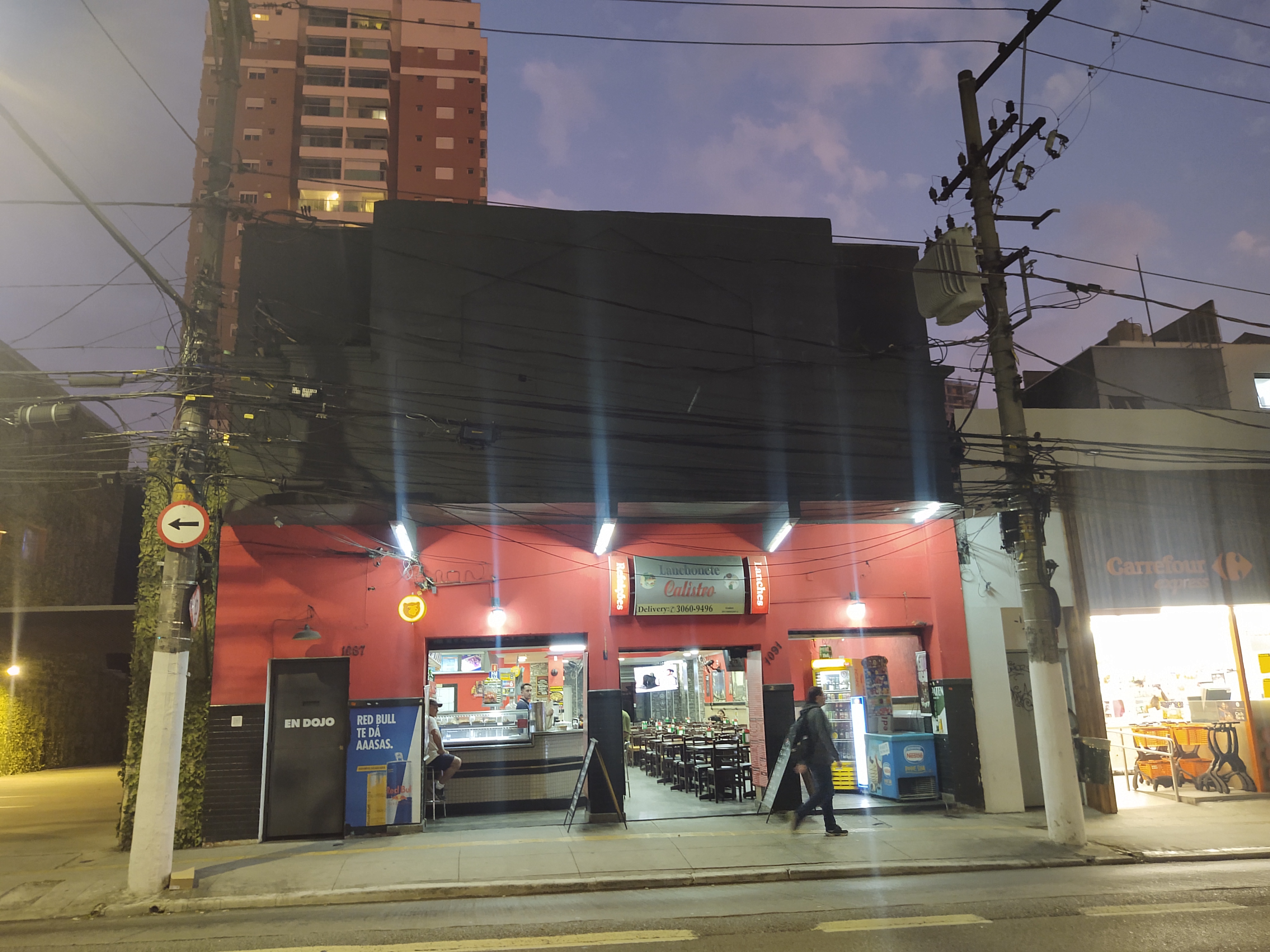
- Interactive map of Teatro Lira Paulistana
- Location: São Paulo
- Coordinates: 23°33′34″S 46°40′49″W

Teatro Lira Paulistana was a theatre in São Paulo, Brazil.

Founded in 1979, in a basement in a building at Rua Teodoro Sampaio, in the neighborhood of Pinheiros, the theatre got is name from a book by Mário de Andrade.

Besides being a music venue, Lira Paulistana was also a cultural point, congregating independent musical scenes such as the Vanguarda Paulista. The theater spun off a record label, Selo Lira Paulistana, and an alternative newspaper.

The theater closed in 1986.
