= Televisão de Cachorro =

Studio album by Pato Fu
- Released: April 1, 1998
- Genres: Alternative rock, indie pop
- Length: 44:24
- Languages: Portuguese, english
- Label: BMG
- Producer: Dudu Marote

Pato Fu chronology
Tem Mas Acabou (1996)	Televisão de Cachorro (1998)	Isopor (1999)

Professional ratings
Review scores
Source	Rating
Allmusic	3/5 stars

Televisão de Cachorro is the fourth studio album of the Brazilian rock band Pato Fu. The album was produced by Dudu Marote.

== Track listing ==
1. "A Necrofilia da Arte" (The Necrophilia of Art) (Rubinho Troll/Gilberto Gil) – 4:04
2. "Antes que Seja Tarde" (Before It's Too Late) (Tarcisio Moura/John Ulhoa/Fernanda Takai) – 4:15
3. "Nunca Diga" (Never Say) (Frank Jorge) – 2:08
4. "Eu Sei" (I Know) (Renato Russo) – 3:05
5. "Licitação" (Bidding) (John Ulhoa) – 2:43
6. "Vivo num Morro" ("I Live on a Hill", but it can be interpreted as "I Live, I Don't Die") (John Ulhoa) – 3:37
7. "Um Dia, Um Ladrão" (One Day, One Thief) (John Ulhoa) – 2:33
8. "Canção pra Você Viver Mais" (Song for You to Live More) (John Ulhoa) – 5:24
9. "Tempestade" (Storm) (M. Vouraski/Marrara/Carlos Pinduca/Prata/Joana Lewis/Txotxa) – 2:48
10. "O Mundo Não Mudou" (The World Hasn't Changed) (John Ulhoa) – 2:44
11. "Televisão de Cachorro" (Doggy TV) (John Ulhoa) – 3:41
12. "Spaceballs, the Ballad" (Zuim/Bert/Bob Faria) – 4:28
13. "Boa Noite" (Good Night) (Ricardo Kóctus) – 2:54

== Personnel ==
Pato Fu

- Fernanda Takai - vocals (lead on 1—4, 6—9 and 11), acoustic and electric guitars
- John Ulhoa - vocals (lead on "Licitação" and "O Mundo Não Mudou"), acoustic and electric guitars, programming; choir and response yells on "Licitação"
- Ricardo Koctus - bass, vocals (lead on "Boa Noite"); extra solo response yells on "Licitação"
- Xande Tamietti - drums, percussion

Additional musicians

- André Abujamra e Edu K - choir and voice actors on "Licitação"
- Marcos Bowie - choir on "Licitação" and LSD choir on "Spaceballs"
- Dudu Marote and Aluízer Malab - response yells on "Licitação"
- James Muller - percussion (on "Vivo num Morro", "Licitação" and "Spaceballs")
- Ed Côrtes - baritone and tenor saxophone on "Vivo num Morro"
- Sidney Borgani - trombone on "Vivo Num Morro"
- Nahor Gomes - trumpet on "Vivo num Morro"

Production

- Dudu Marote - production
- Luis Paulo Serafim - recording, mixing
- Leon Zervos - mastering at Absolute Audio
- Getúlio, Enrico Romano. Rodrigo Paciência, Rogério Pereira e Rodrigo - overdubs
- Márcio Thees, Max PA, Carlos Blau. Pedro Cortes e Joy Passarelli: studio assistants
- Luiz Otávio Âmbar e Kerley Gonçalves - roadies

== Curiosities ==
- The disc's eighth track, "Canção pra Você Viver Mais," is dedicated to Fernanda's father, who suffered from a serious illness. Takai had already written the title without being able to compose a letter to her father. John, upon learning this, wrote the music and presented it to Fernanda, who thanked Ulhoa for managing to externalize what she felt to be losing.
