= Pato Fu =

Brazilian indie rock band

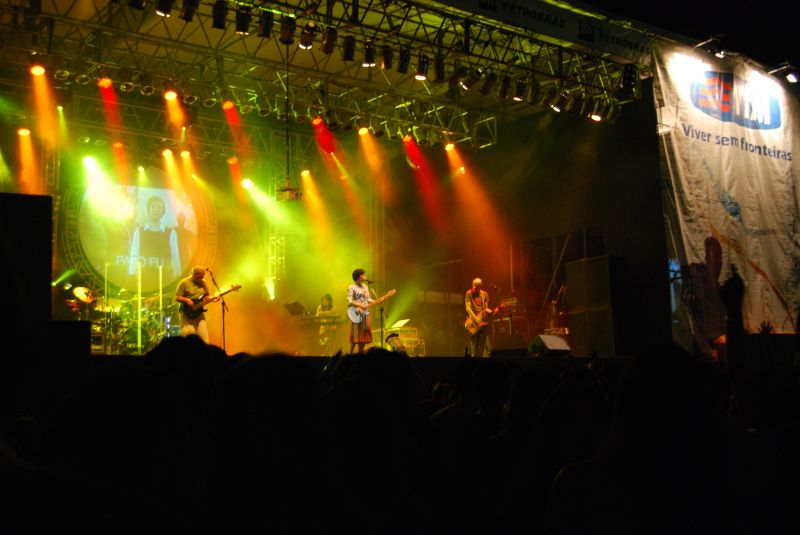
- Pato Fu, August 2008.

Background information
- Origin: Belo Horizonte, Brazil
- Genres: Indie rock; indie pop
- Years active: 1992–present
- Labels: Cogumelo Records, Plug / BMG, Epic / Sony BMG, Rotomusic
- Members: Fernanda Takai; John Ulhoa; Ricardo Koctus; Richard Neves; Xande Tamietti
- Past members: Glauco Nastácia; Dudu Tsuda; Lulu Camargo
- Website: www.patofu.com.br

Pato Fu is a Brazilian indie rock band from Belo Horizonte, Minas Gerais. The band was formed by lead singer & rhythm guitarist Fernanda Takai, lead guitarist, backing vocalist and primary songwriter John Ulhoa, and bassist Ricardo Koctus, in September 1992. Long-time drummer Xande Tamietti joined after the release of Gol de Quem? and left the band in 2014, being replaced by Glauco Nastácia until Tamietti returned again in 2022; keyboardist Richard Neves replaced [Lulu Camargo in 2016. The band is also famous for their 2010 album Música de Brinquedo, which was written using only toy instruments. It was at one point included with U2 and Radiohead in a list of the 10 best bands in the world, according to Time magazine.

== History ==
Their first album, Rotomusic de Liquidificapum, was released in 1993, followed, since then, by other eight releases: Tem Mas Acabou (1996), Gol de Quem? (1997), Televisão de Cachorro (1998), Isopor (1999), Ruído Rosa (2000), MTV ao Vivo: No Museu de Arte da Pampulha (2002), Toda Cura para Todo Mal (2005), and Daqui Pro Futuro (2007), and with launch scheduled for 2010, Música de Brinquedo. The band's popularity began to increase simultaneously with two other groups from Belo Horizonte, Jota Quest and Skank. The band plays in alternative rock style, but resorting frequently to experimental music elements. Pato Fu is frequently said to be influenced by Os Mutantes, a famous Brazilian tropicalist group from the 1960s, probably because of the experimentalism found in both bands' songs. Their music is influenced by Devo, The Cure, Radiohead, Pizzicato Five, Super Furry Animals and also Brazilian Popular Music, among various others. Takai once said her singing is influenced by Suzanne Vega, of whom she is a fan.

Takai and Ulhoa are married and had a daughter, Nina, in 2003.

The band name is from a Garfield comic strip. Garfield attacked the mailman with his "Cat Fu" techniques. The band liked the wordplay, but decided to change Gato (cat) to Pato (duck). Coincidentally or not, the expression had also previously appeared in the Brazilian translation of the Howard the Duck movie, as the translation to the term "quack-fu".

The band celebrated its 10th anniversary in 2003 with the release of MTV ao Vivo: No Museu de Arte da Pampulha, a live performance with some of their most famous songs.

In 2010, Pato Fu recorded an album of Brazilian and international rock classics played only with toy instruments called Música de Brinquedo, which generated a positive response from the public. Songs such as "Live And Let Die" and "Rock And Roll Lullaby" were present. A live DVD, called Música de Brinquedo Ao Vivo, was recorded in 2011.

In 2015, their album Não Pare Pra Pensar was nominated for the 16th Latin Grammy Awards in the Best Brazilian Rock Album category. Their album 30 was chosen by the Associação Paulista de Críticos de Arte as one of the 50 best Brazilian albums of 2023.

== Band members ==
Current members

- Fernanda Takai - lead vocals, rhythm guitar (1992–present)
- John Ulhoa - lead guitar, cavaquinho, backing and lead vocals (1992–present)
- Ricardo Koctus - bass, pandeiro, backing vocals (1992–present)
- Xande Tamietti - drums, percussion (1996–2014, 2022-present)
- Richard Neves - keyboards, accordion, piano (2016–present)

Former members

- Dudu Tsuda - keyboards, piano (2008–2009)
- Lulu Camargo - keyboards, piano (2005–2016)
- Glauco Nastácia - drums, percussion (2014–2022)

Touring members

- André Abujamra - guitars, piano (1996-1998)
- Hugo Hori - saxophone (1996)
- Tiquinho - trumpet (1996)
- Sérgio Bartolo - bass (1996)
- Haroldo Ferreti - drums, percussion (1993)

== Discography ==
Studio albums

- Rotomusic de Liquidificapum (1993)
- Gol de Quem? (1995) + 50,000
- Tem Mas Acabou (1996)
- Televisão de Cachorro (1998) + 100,000
- Isopor (1999) + 160,000
- Ruído Rosa (2001)
- Toda Cura para Todo Mal (2005) + 25,000
- Daqui Pro Futuro (2007)
- Música de Brinquedo (2010) + 40,000
- Não Pare Pra Pensar (2014) + 10,000

Live albums

- MTV ao Vivo - Pato Fu no Museu de Arte da Pampulha (2002)
- Música de Brinquedo Ao Vivo (2011) + 25,000

DVDs

- MTV ao Vivo - Pato Fu no Museu de Arte da Pampulha (2002)
- Video Clipes (2004)
- Toda Cura para Todo Mal (2007)
- Extra! Extra! (2009)
- Música de Brinquedo Ao Vivo (2011)

=== Singles ===
Year	Single	Album
1993	"Rotomusic de Liquidificapum"	Rotomusic de Liquidificapum
1993	"O Processo de Criação Vai de 10 até 100 Mil"	Rotomusic de Liquidificapum
1993	"Meu Pai, Meu Irmão"	Rotomusic de Liquidificapum
1995	"Mamãe Ama É o Meu Revolver"	Gol de Quem?
1995	"Sobre o Tempo"	Gol de Quem?
1995	"Qualquer Bobagem"	Gol de Quem?
1996	"Pinga"	Tem Mas Acabou
1996	"Água"	Tem Mas Acabou
1996	"O Peso das Coisas"	Tem Mas Acabou
1998	"Antes Que Seja Tarde"	Televisão de Cachorro
1998	"Eu Sei"	Televisão de Cachorro
1998	"Canção pra Você Viver Mais"	Televisão de Cachorro
1999	"Depois"	Isopor
1999	"Made in Japan"	Isopor
1999	"Perdendo Dentes"	Isopor
2001	"Eu"	Ruído Rosa
2001	"Menti Pra Você, Mas Foi Sem Querer"	Ruído Rosa
2002	"Por Perto"	MTV ao Vivo - Pato Fu no Museu de Arte da Pampulha
2002	"Não Mais"	MTV ao Vivo - Pato Fu no Museu de Arte da Pampulha
2005	"Uh Uh Uh, La La La, Ié Ié!"	Toda Cura para Todo Mal
2005	"Anormal"	Toda Cura para Todo Mal
2005	"Sorte e Azar"	Toda Cura para Todo Mal
2005	"Amendoim"	Toda Cura para Todo Mal
2007	"Cities in Dust"	Daqui Pro Futuro
2007	"30.000 Pés"	Daqui Pro Futuro
2007	"Nada Original"	Daqui Pro Futuro
2007	"Tudo Vai Ficar Bem"	Daqui Pro Futuro
2010	"Rock and Roll Lullaby"	Música de Brinquedo
2010	"Todos Estão Surdos"	Música de Brinquedo
2010	"Live and Let Die"	Música de Brinquedo
2010	"Primavera (Vai Chuva)"	Música de Brinquedo
2011	"Bohemian Rhapsody"	Música de Brinquedo Ao Vivo
2011	"Simplicidade"	Música de Brinquedo Ao Vivo
2011	"Sobre O Tempo"	Música de Brinquedo Ao Vivo
2011	"Eu"	Música de Brinquedo Ao Vivo

=== Hits ===
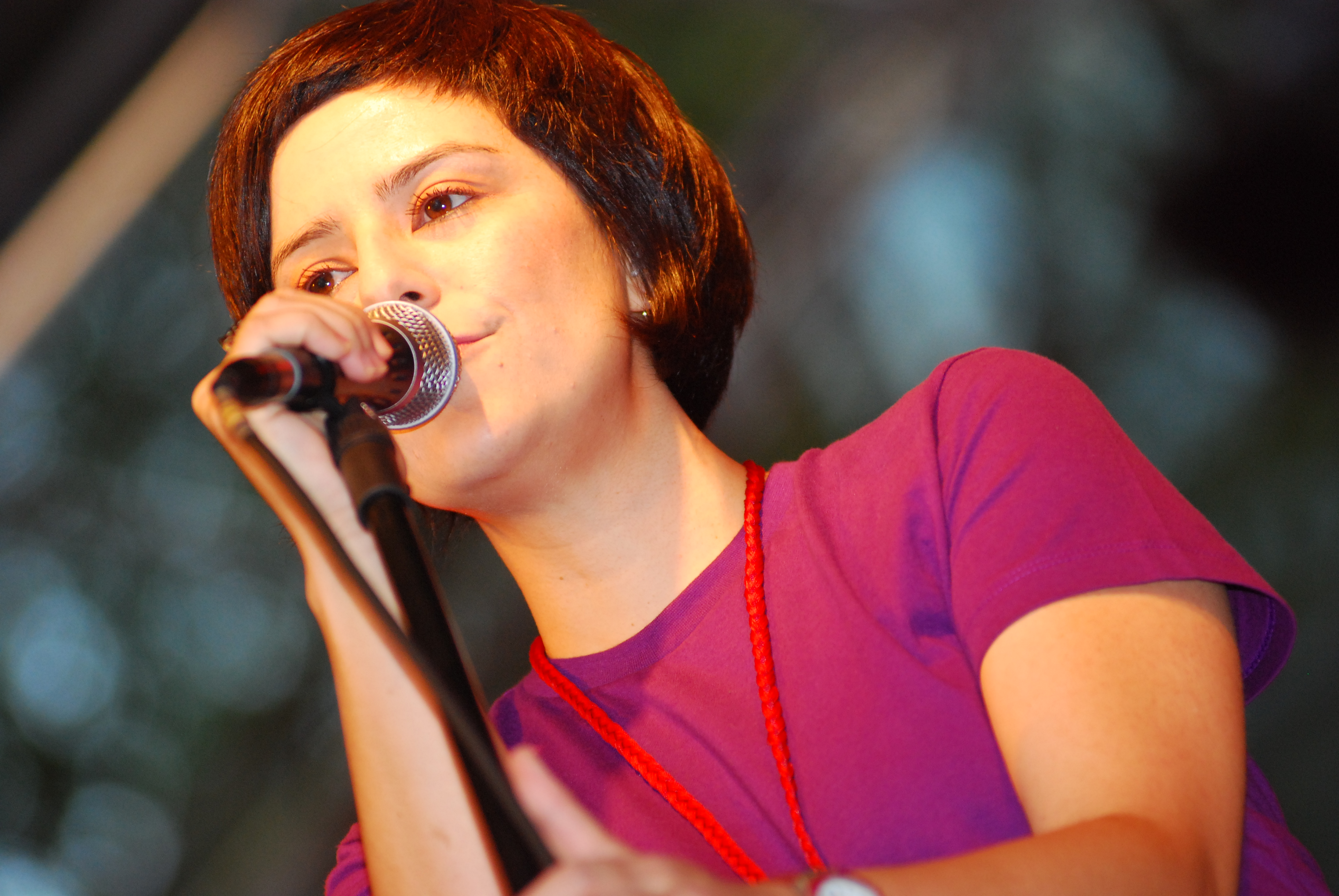
Fernanda Takai, lead singer of the band.

- "Sobre o Tempo" (from Gol de Quem?)
- "Pinga" (from Tem Mas Acabou; the song's name refers to a Brazilian drink, cachaça)
- "Canção pra Você Viver Mais" (from Televisão de Cachorro; a tribute to Takai's father)
- "Antes Que Seja Tarde" (from Televisão de Cachorro)
- "Made in Japan" (from Isopor; sung almost entirely in Japanese. It was written in Portuguese by John and translated by a Japanese teacher. Its video clip is a tribute to old Japanese Sci-Fi movies and a satire against Americanization, winning a Brazilian VMA award). The chorus comes from the song Mah Nà Mah Nà (see the article's "external links" section).
- "Depois" (from Isopor)
- "Perdendo Dentes" (from Isopor)
- "Eu" (from Ruído Rosa; a tribute to theremin)
- "Ando Meio Desligado" (from Ruído Rosa; Os Mutantes cover)
- "Por Perto" (from MTV ao Vivo)
- "Uh Uh Uh, Lá Lá Lá, Ié Ié!" (from Toda Cura para Todo Mal)
- "Sorte e Azar" (from Toda Cura para Todo Mal)
- "Anormal" (from Toda Cura para Todo Mal)
- "Rock And Roll Lullaby" (cover, toy instruments)
