= Grupo Rumo =

- Origin: São Paulo, Brazil
- Genres: Música popular brasileira Vanguarda Paulista
- Years active: 1974–1992; 2004–present
- Website: gruporumo.com.br

Grupo Rumo is a Brazilian musical band started in 1974.

Rumo was formed in São Paulo by students, most of them from the University of São Paulo, and the majority of them from that univerity's School of Communication and Arts, led by Luiz Tatit.

The group began to produce songs with a different treatment in terms of composition and arrangement, such as the role of the intonations of everyday speech, a "spoken singing" in the compositions and the role of the instrumentation enhancing the main line of the singing in the arrangements.

In 1979, Ná Ozzetti joins the band.

With the emergence of the so-called Vanguarda Paulistana, they managed to record their first two LPs independently in 1981, called Rumo (their own songs) and Rumo aos Antigos (with reinterpretations of lesser-known songs by authors from the past, such as Noel Rosa, Lamartine Babo, Sinhô, among others).

== Lineup ==
=== Original formation ===
- Luiz Tatit: acoustic guitar an vocals
- Ná Ozzetti: percussion and vocals
- Hélio Ziskind: flute, saxophone, guitar and vocals
- Akira Ueno: bass and percussion
- Paulo Tatit: electric guitar, acoustic guitar, bass and vocals
- Ciça Tuccori: piano and xylophone
- Pedro Mourão: guitar and vocals
- Gal Oppido: drums
- Zecarlos Ribeiro: percussion
- Geraldo Leite: vocals

=== Current formation ===
- Luiz Tatit: guitar and vocals
- Ná Ozzetti: percussion and vocals
- Hélio Ziskind: flute, saxophone, guitar and voice
- Akira Ueno: bass and percussion
- Paulo Tatit: guitar, bass and vocals
- Pedro Mourão: guitar and vocals
- Gal Oppido: drums
- Zecarlos Ribeiro: vocals and percussion
- Geraldo Leite: vocals and percussion

== Discography ==
The 1981 a 1992 records were re-released in CD by Trama in 2004.

Name	Year	Label	Medium
Rumo	1981	Rumo Empreendimentos Artísticos	LP, CD, Music download, streaming
Rumo aos antigos	1981	Rumo Empreendimentos Artísticos	LP, CD, Music download, streaming
Diletantismo	1983	Lira Paulistana/Continental	LP, CD, Music download, streaming
Caprichoso	1986	Rumo Empreendimentos Artísticos	LP, CD, Music download, streaming
Quero passear	1988	Estúdio Eldorado	LP, CD, Music download, streaming
O sumo do Rumo	1989	Estúdio Eldorado	LP
Rumo ao vivo	1992	Rumo Empreendimentos Artísticos	CD, Music download, streaming
Rumo	2004	Cultura Marcas	DVD
Universo	2019	Selo Sesc	CD, Music download, streaming
