= Haroldo de Campos =

Brazilian poet, critic, professor, and translator (1929–2003)

- Born: Haroldo Eurico Browne de Campos; 19 August 1929; São Paulo, Brazil
- Died: 17 August 2003 (aged 73); São Paulo, Brazil
- Writing career
- Notable work: A arte no horizonte do provável e outros ensaios
- Notable awards: Prêmio Jabuti (1991); Prêmio da Associação Paulista dos Críticos da Arte (2009)

Haroldo Eurico Browne de Campos (19 August 1929 – 17 August 2003) was a Brazilian poet, critic, professor and translator. He is widely regarded as one of the most important figures in Brazilian literature since 1950.

== Biography ==
He did his secondary education at Colégio São Bento, where he learned his first foreign languages (Latin, English, Spanish, French). He and his brother Augusto de Campos, together with Décio Pignatari, formed the poetic group Noigandres that published the experimental journal of the same name, which would launch the Brazilian movement of poesia concreta (concrete poetry). Haroldo received his doctorate from the Faculty of Philosophy, Letters and Human Sciences of USP (Universidade de São Paulo), under the guidance of Antonio Candido. Haroldo was professor at the Catholic University, PUC-SP, and visiting professor at Yale and the University of Texas at Austin. His biography was included in the Encyclopædia Britannica in 1997 and he was awarded the Premio Octavio Paz de Poesia y Ensayo, Mexico, in 1999.

In addition to his vast repertory of original poetry and literary essays, Haroldo translated some of the most important literature of the Western tradition into Portuguese, such as Homer's Iliad, prose by James Joyce and poetry by Mallarmé. When he died he left unfinished a translation of Dante's Commedia, a manuscript that Umberto Eco had a chance to read, which compelled him to say that "Haroldo de Campos is the best Dante translator in the world". Translation, according to Haroldo de Campos, is much more than moving text from one language to another. Elements of the structure of the poem, like rhythm and sound combinations (rhyme, echoes, assonance, etc.) are often more important than semantics per se. His translations include poetry, Chinese, Japanese, Greek and Hebrew texts. He translated, major names of world literature, such as Goethe (German), Ezra Pound, James Joyce (English), Mayakovsky (Russian), Mallarmé (French), Dante (Italian) and Octavio Paz (Spanish). On stage, his works have been performed by three actors: Giulia Gam (1989, Cena da Origem, directed by Bia Lessa), Bete Coelho (1997, Graal: Retrato de um Fausto Quando Jovem, by Gerald Thomas) and Luiz Päetow (2015, Puzzle, by Felipe Hirsch).

== Bibliography ==
=== Translations ===
- Ezra Pound - Cantares (together with Augusto de Campos and Décio Pignatari, 1960)
- Panorama do Finnegans Wake (together with Augusto de Campos, 1962)
- Poesia Russa Moderna (together with Augusto de Campos and Boris Schnaiderman, 1968)
- A Operação do Texto (directives for the translation of the poem A Sierguéi Iessiênin, de Maiakovski. 1976)
- Deus e o Diabo no Fausto de Goethe (translation of fragments of Goethe's version for the myth Faust, 1981). ISBN 8527304503.
- Transblanco (translation of the poem Blanco, byOctavio Paz. 1986)
- Mallarmé (translation of some of Mallarmé's poems done together with Augusto de Campos and Décio Pignatari, 1991)
- Pedra e Luz na Poesia de Dante (translation of fragments of the Divine Comedy, 2000)
- Bere'shith: A Cena da Origen (translation of the Book of Genesis and The Book of Job, 2000)
- Ilíada de Homero vol. 1 (with notes by Trajano Vieira, 2001). ISBN 8575810219
- Ilíada de Homero vol. 2 (with notes by Trajano Vieira, 2002)
- Maiakovski Poemas (together with Augusto de Campos and Boris Schnaiderman, 2002)
- Ungaretti - Daquela Estrela à Outra (translation of poems of the Italian poet Giuseppe Ungaretti, together with Aurora Bernadiel, 2003)
- Qohélet - o que sabe (translation of the biblical book Ecclesiastes, 2004)
- Éden - Um Tríptico Bíblico (2005)
- Hagoromo de Zeami (translation of the theater play Nô; hagoromo, written by Zeami Motokiyo, 2005)

== Volumes of poetry ==
- Xadrez de Estrelas (1976)
- Signância: Quase Céu (1979)
- Galáxias (1984)
- A Educação dos Cinco Sentidos (1985)
- Crisantempo (1998)
- A Máquina do Mundo Repensada (2001)
