= Vanguarda Paulista =

Music genre

Vanguarda Paulista, also named Vanguarda Paulistana (São Paulo Avant-garde), was the name given to a Brazilian cultural movement which happened in São Paulo between 1979 and 1985, at the final years of the Brazilian military dictatorship. The moniker was given by city's journalists and music critics, by its avant-garde aspect and referring to one of the venues where the artists performed: the Teatro Lira Paulistana, in the neighborhood of Pinheiros, from which a record label and publishing house were also spun. Vanguarda Paulista musicians had different styles, but there were unifying characteristics among some of them: a spoken word-like singing style, the blending of classical and popular elements, humorous lyrics laden with social criticism, and an independent, do-it-yourself spirit.

== Main artists ==
Some of the main names associated with Vanguarda Paulista are Elza Soares, Arrigo Barnabé, Itamar Assumpção, Ná Ozzetti, Eliete Negreiros, Cida Moreira, the bands Patife Band, Grupo Rumo, Língua de Trapo, and Premeditando o Breque.
