= Cidade Oculta =

- Directed by: Chico Botelho
- Written by: Chico Botelho; Arrigo Barnabé; Walter Rogério
- Starring: Arrigo Barnabé; Carla Camurati; Cláudio Mamberti; Celso Saiki
- Production company: Orion Cinema e Vídeo
- Distributed by: Embrafilme
- Release date: 30 November 1986
- Running time: 80 minutes
- Country: Brazil
- Language: Portuguese

Cidade Oculta is a 1986 Brazilian crime film directed by Chico Botelho and written by Botelho, Arrigo Barnabé, and Walter Rogério. It stars Barnabé, Carla Camurati, Cláudio Mamberti, and Celso Saiki. The film was produced by Orion Cinema e Vídeo and distributed by Embrafilme. The film is part of the so-called "São Paulo Night Trilogy" ("Trilogia Paulistana da Noite"), along with Anjos da Noite (1987) and A Dama do Cine Shanghai (1988), which are films that depict the urban and nocturnal life of São Paulo with a noir and postmodern aesthetic, breaking away from the realist Cinema Novo tradition.

== Plot ==
Anjo has just been released after seven years in prison. He unexpectedly reconnects with Japa, his companion at the time of his arrest and now the leader of a gang. Through Japa, he meets Shirley Sombra and, even against his will, ends up involved with the two in new adventures, earning amidst the chaos the mortal enmity of Ratão, a corrupt police officer. Amid constant assignments and escapes, trusting and distrusting Japa, and becoming increasingly entangled in a romantic affair with Shirley, Anjo tries to reconstruct what happened years earlier to unravel the mysteries surrounding his peculiar arrest. Gradually, he delves deeper into the intricacies of police corruption. Only Shirley is able to move effortlessly through all circles, and thus Anjo depends on her protection. After a series of chases, escapes, and shootouts, they are finally cornered by Ratão in a house in Liberdade—the historic Japanese district of São Paulo—where Japa had taken Anjo, setting the stage for the definitive settling of scores among the four.

== Cast ==
- Arrigo Barnabé as Anjo
- Carla Camurati as Shirley Sombra
- Cláudio Mamberti as Ratão
- Celso Saiki as Japa
- Jaime Del Cueto as Bozo
- Jô Soares as Riperti
- Beth Coelho as dancer
- Ana Kfouri as dancer
- Lali Krotosynki as dancer
- Daniele Cataladi as dancer
- Guilherme Werner as dancer
- Juarez Stevan as dancer
- Chiquinho Brandão
- Cristina Sano
- Wilson Sampson
- Renata Giglioli
- Manfredo Bahia
- Raimundo Mattos
- Tânia Celidônio
- Paulo Barnabé
- Itamar Assumpção

== Reception ==
Critic Fernando Oriente, on the website Tudo Vai Bem, said: "São Paulo is, in Botelho's film, the main character. The director attempts to delve into its layers, exposing its characters as parts of the organism that is this city. With a special attention to the visual beauty of his filmic material, Chico Botelho manages, with hits and misses, to convey far more than a postmodern discourse. What stands out most in the film is the desire for cinema, the urgency of making cinema." He further stated: "Anjo's sense of failure [...] is a reflection of the feeling of defeat of the ideals and expectations of Chico Botelho's generation—the generation of the 60s." He noted that the film's editing "is one of its weak points," but said: "It is a film in which one can perceive the intentions of its discourse precisely in its missteps. This paradox between the film as a whole and Chico Botelho's passionate need to make cinema gives the feature a rare sincerity."

=== Accolades ===
Year	Awards	Category	Nominee(s)	Result	Ref.
1986	Rio-Cine Festival	Best Picture	Cidade Oculta	Won	
1986	Rio-Cine Festival	Best Director	Chico Botelho	Won	
1986	Rio-Cine Festival	Best Music	Arrigo Barnabé	Won	
1986	Rio-Cine Festival	Best Soundtrack	Walter Rogério	Won	
1986	Rio-Cine Festival	Best Cinematography	José Roberto Eliezer	Won	
1986	Rio-Cine Festival	Best Supporting Actor	Cláudio Mamberti	Won	
