= Augusto de Campos =

Brazilian writer (born 1931)

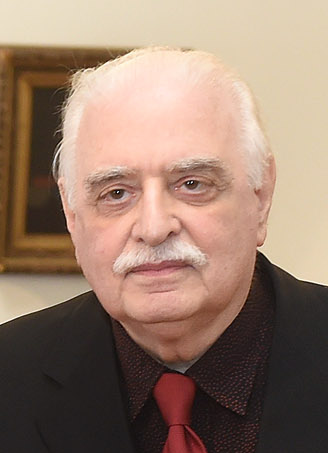
- Augusto de Campos (2015)
- Born: 14 February 1931 (age 95); São Paulo, Brazil
- Occupations: Poet and visual artist

Augusto de Campos (born 14 February 1931) is a Brazilian writer, translator, music critic, and visual artist who, with his brother Haroldo de Campos, established the Concrete poetry movement in Brazil.

== Work ==
In 1952, Campos founded the literary magazine Noigandres with his brother. In 1956, he and his associates declared the beginning of a literary movement. Since then, he has published many collections and received several honors.

From the 1950s through the 1970s, his main works focused on visual poetry. From 1980, he intensified his experiments with new media, presenting poems via electric billboards, videotext, neon, holograms, lasers, computer graphics, and multimedia events that integrated sound and music. He explored a plurivocal reading of CIDADECITYCITÉ with his son Cid Campos (1987–1991).

Four of his holographic poems, created in collaboration with the holographer Moysés Baumstein, were featured in the exhibitions TRILUZ (1986) and IDEHOLOGIA (1987). A "videoclippoem", O PULSAR, with music by Caetano Veloso, was produced in 1984 at an Intergraph high-resolution computer station. BOMB POEM and SOS, with music by Cid Campos, were animated on a Silicon Graphics computer station of the University of São Paulo (1992–1993).

His collaboration with Cid, which began in 1987, resulted in POESIA É RISCO (Poetry is Risk), a CD launched by PolyGram in 1995. The recording was developed into a multimedia performance under the same title, a "verbivocovisual" poetry/music/image show with video editing by Walter Silveira, and was presented in several cities in Brazil and abroad. An installation also assembled his digital poetic animations.

An exhibition dedicated to his digital art, TransCreation, was held from August 2 to October 29, 2021, at The NEXT Museum, Library, and Preservation Space.

== Collections ==
- Museo de Arte Latinoamericano de Buenos Aires (MALBA), Buenos Aires, Argentina
- Museo Reina Sofia, Madrid, Spain
- The Ruth and Marvin Sackner Archive of Concrete and Visual Poetry, University of Iowa Libraries, Iowa City, IA, USA

== Awards ==
In 2015 Augusto de Campos received Brazil's Order of Cultural Merit. In 2017 he was honoured by the Janus Pannonius Grand Prize for Poetry (award of the Hungarian PEN Club).
