= Itamar Assumpção =

Background information
- Born: September 13, 1949; Tietê, Brazil
- Died: June 12, 2003 (aged 53) São Paulo, Brazil
- Occupations: Composer, songwriter

Itamar Assumpção (September 13, 1949 – June 12, 2003) was a Brazilian songwriter and composer who was born in Tietê, a city in the Brazilian state of São Paulo. Assumpção built a strong reputation in the Brazilian independent and alternative music scenes during the 1980s and 1990s, particularly in his home state of São Paulo.

== Biography ==
Itamar Assumpção was one of the biggest names and contributors in the "Vanguarda Paulista" ("São Paulo Vanguard" in English), an alternative scene that dominated São Paulo in the very late 70s and the first half of the 80s. This movement united artists who operated involuntarily outside of the established commercial music industry during an era that pre-dated the Internet, the politics of downloading and the contemporary indie music scene. The "Vanguarda" was responsible for launching many new talents and establishing a foundation for autonomous, self-sufficient music production (and subsequent release) by artists such as Arrigo Barnabé and Grupo Rumo.

Assumpção's music was a fusion of various styles and was predominantly influenced by "rock", "samba" and "funk". The lyrics contained within the songs were infused with sharp satire and heavy social criticism, with the lyrical content of Assumpção's music also reflecting a number of influences - Adoniran Barbosa, Cartola, Jimi Hendrix, Miles Davis, the poetry of Paulo Leminski and Alice Ruiz.

=== Early life ===
Assumpção was black; a great-grandson of enslaved Angolans and grew up listening to the drums of umbanda in the backyard patio of his home. It was later in his youth that Jimi Hendrix came to prominence and, being a self-taught acoustic guitar player, a young Assumpção fell in love with the rhythm section of the music of the now-legendary guitar virtuoso. Assumpção actually grew up in Arapongas, a municipality of the Brazilian state, Paraná, the area he moved to at the age of 12 after his birthplace of São Paulo. Embracing a passion for music from an early age, Assumpção reportedly left accounting school during the second term to perform drama at the theater and music concerts in the city of Londrina instead.

=== Later years ===
In 1973, he returned to São Paulo to devote himself to music and was performing on the Lira Paulistana stage soon after his arrival in the city.

The Lira Paulistana theater, located in the Pinheiros district of São Paulo, was a central platform for participants in the "Vanguarda Paulistana" and Itamar Assumpção's name was a regular feature at the venue. Whoever has not sung in the Lira, has not dreamt (Quem não cantou no Lira, não sonhou in Portuguese), explained J'Cor (Le Dantas Cordeiro), a poet from the scene. The prominent figures of the movement - Assumpção, Barnabé, Grupo Rumo, Premê (Premeditando o Breque), Le Dantas Cordeiro and others - soon earned the nickname of "Damned", with the reason behind this title unclear at the present time (it may have had to do with the reduced financial potential of their musical output due to their position outside of the Brazilian music industry, an observation that gained substance when the movement eventually dismantled due, in part, to a lack of commercial success). For the popular media, the work of the "Vanguarda" artists was labeled as difficult and inaccessible.

His first piece of recorded music was the 1980 independent album, Beleléu Leléu Eu and eight years following this release he was to record what would be his only ever record with a major music company, Intercontinental! Quem diria! Era só o que faltava... (Intercontinental! Who knew! It's just what was missing...).

Assumpção died of colorectal cancer in 2003. His daughters Anelis and Serena have both pursued musical careers.

== Discography ==
- Beleléu, Leléu, Eu. Lira Paulistana, 1980.
- Às Próprias Custas S/A. Lira Paulistana, 1981.
- Sampa Midnight - isso não vai ficar assim, independent, 1983.
- Intercontinental ! Quem Diria! Era Só o Que Faltava !!!, Atração, 1988.
- Bicho de Sete Cabeças Vol I, Baratos Afins, 1993.
- Bicho de Sete Cabeças Vol II, Baratos Afins, 1993.
- Bicho de Sete Cabeças Vol III, Baratos Afins, 1993.
- Ataulfo Alves por Itamar Assumpção - Pra Sempre Agora, Paradoxx, 1996.
- Pretobrás, Atração, 1998.
- Vasconcelos e Assumpção - isso vai dar repercussão, Elo Music, 2004. Com Naná Vasconcelos.

== See also ==
- Vânia Bastos
