= Arrigo Barnabé =

Brazilian musician and actor (born 1951)

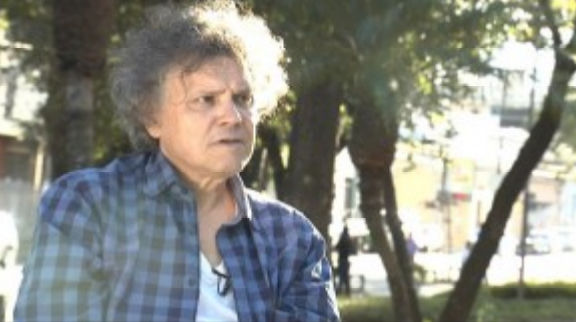

Background information
- Born: September 14, 1951 (age 74); Londrina, Brazil
- Genres: Avant-garde, experimental, psychedelic rock, progressive rock
- Occupations: Musician, composer, actor
- Instruments: Piano, vocal, synthesizer, percussion
- Years active: 1980-presents

Arrigo Barnabé (born September 14, 1951) is a Brazilian musician and actor. His best-known record is perhaps the critically acclaimed Clara Crocodilo.

Barnabé was born in Londrina, Paraná, Brazil. His music is best known for having a heavily experimental approach, in which the author uses dodecaphonism and atonalism as main principles of composition. He also has written soundtracks for several Brazilian movies.

He hosts a radio show called Supertônicas at Rádio Cultura in São Paulo.

Arrigo Barnabé is cited in the songs "Língua" by Caetano Veloso and "Eu Quero Saber Quem Matou" by Rogério Skylab.

He has a younger brother, Paulo Barnabé, also a musician and member of the experimental band Patife Band.

== Discography ==
- 1980 - Clara Crocodilo
- 1984 - Tubarões Voadores
- 1986 - Cidade Oculta (movie soundtrack)
- 1987 - Suspeito
- 1992 - Façanhas
- 1997 - Ed Mort (movie soundtrack)
- 1998 - Gigante Negão
- 1999 - A Saga de Clara Crocodilo
- 2004 - Coletânea 25 Anos de Clara Crocodilo (Includes: Clara Crocodilo, Tubarões Voadores, Gigante Negão, A Saga de Clara Crocodilo and Uma Suíte a Quatro Mãos)
- 2004 - Missa in Memorian Arthur Bispo do Rosário
- 2007 - Missa in Memorian Itamar Assumpção

== Filmography ==
- 1981 - O Olho Mágico do Amor
- 1986 - Cidade Oculta
- 1986 - Nem Tudo É Verdade— playing the role of Orson Welles
- 1987 - Anjos da Noite
- 2002 - Desmundo
- 2012 - Luz nas Trevas

== See also ==
- Vânia Bastos
- Itamar Assumpção
- Vanguarda Paulista
