= Décio Pignatari =

Brazilian poet, essayist and translator (1927–2012)

- Born: August 20, 1927; Jundiaí, São Paulo, Brazil
- Died: December 2, 2012 (aged 85); São Paulo, Brazil
- Occupations: Poet; essayist; teacher; translator
- Website: www.deciopignatari.com

Décio Pignatari (August 20, 1927 – December 2, 2012) was a Brazilian poet, essayist and translator.

== Early life and education ==
Born in Jundiaí in 1927, Pignatari began conducting experiments with poetic language, incorporating visuals elements and the fragmentation of words in the 1950s. Such verbal adventures culminated in concretism, aesthetic movement that he co-founded with Augusto and Haroldo de Campos, with whom he edited the journals Noigandres and Invention and published the Theory of Concrete Poetry (1965).

== Career ==
As a theorist of communication and semiotics, Pignatari translated works of Marshall McLuhan and published the essay Information, Language and Communication (1968). His poetic work can also be read in Poesia Pois é Poesia (Poetry because it's Poetry) (1977).

Pignatari published translations of Dante Alighieri, Goethe and Shakespeare, among others, gathered in Portrait of Love when Young (1990) and 231 poems. He also published a volume of stories The Face of Memory (1988) and the novel Panteros (1992), as well as a work for theater, Céu de Lona (Sailcloth Sky).

He died in São Paulo of a respiratory illness on December 2, 2012.
