= Uma Tarde na Fruteira =

Studio album by Jupiter Apple
- Released: 2007 (original version); 2008 (re-release)
- Genre: Progressive rock, psychedelic rock, art rock, folk rock
- Label: Elefant Records (original version); Monstro Discos (re-release)
- Producer: Thomas Dreher

Jupiter Apple chronology
| Bitter (2007) | Uma Tarde na Fruteira (2007) | Six Colours Frenesi (2014) |

Alternative cover
- 2008 Monstro Discos re-issue

Professional ratings
Review scores
| Source | Rating |
|---|---|
| AllMusic | link |

Uma Tarde na Fruteira (Portuguese for "An Evening in the Fruit Stand") is the fourth studio album by the Brazilian musician Jupiter Apple; released in 2007 by Spanish label Elefant Records, it was the musician's final studio album to come out during his lifetime. Distancing itself from its predecessors Plastic Soda and Hisscivilization, it is mostly sung in Portuguese and returns to the more "accessible" psychedelia of his 1997 debut A Sétima Efervescência, in sonority terms.

The album was re-issued in Brazil by Monstro Discos in 2008, with a different cover art and track list; while the original Elefant version is more of a compilation with some previously unreleased tracks in-between, Monstro's version contains only new tracks.

Music videos were made for the tracks "A Marchinha Psicótica de Dr. Soup" and "Mademoiselle Marchand".

"Beatle George" is a tribute to George Harrison.

A double-vinyl deluxe edition of Uma Tarde na Fruteira, also by Monstro Discos, was released in January 2019.

== Covers and appearances in other media ==
Rogério Skylab covered "Na Casa de Mamãe" for his 2009 album Skygirls, and "A Marchinha Psicótica de Dr. Soup" for his 2019 album Crítica da Faculdade do Cu. Early versions of "A Marchinha Psicótica de Dr. Soup" and "As Mesmas Coisas" appeared in the soundtrack of the 2006 animated film Wood & Stock: Sexo, Orégano e Rock'n'Roll.

== Critical reception ==
Uma Tarde na Fruteira has received positive reviews upon its release. Stewart Mason of AllMusic gave it 3.5 out of 5 stars, describing it as a "double-album-length potted history/reconstruction of the most vibrant era in Brazilian music – roughly from the birth of bossa nova through the petering out of Tropicália, or the late '50s through the early '70s". He praised the album as being "richly melodic and instantly memorable". Bruno Yutaka Saito of Folha de S.Paulo also spoke favorably of the album, comparing its "eclectic" sonority to the works of Caetano Veloso, Roberto Carlos and Stereolab.

Writing for his website Trabalho Sujo in 2009, Alexandre Matias included the album in his list of the 50 Greatest Albums of 2008, in 24th place.

La Cumbuca included Uma Tarde na Fruteira in 198th place in its list of the Top 200 Brazilian Albums of the 2000s.

== Track listing ==
=== Elefant Records version (2007) ===
All tracks are written by Jupiter Apple. "Over the Universe", "Collectors Inside Collection" and "Plastic Soda" were originally featured in Plastic Soda (1999); "Act Not Surprised", "Tropical Permanent Holidays", "Metropole" and "The Futuristica Waltz" were originally featured in Hisscivilization (2002).

| No. | Title | English title | Length |
|---|---|---|---|
| 1. | "A Marchinha Psicótica de Dr. Soup" | Dr. Soup's Psychotic Marchinha | 4:42 |
| 2. | "Tema de Júpiter Maçã" | Jupiter Apple's Theme | 3:54 |
| 3. | "Base Primitiva Revisitada" | Primitive Base Revisited | 3:49 |
| 4. | "Over the Universe" | | 5:13 |
| 5. | "A Menina Super Brasil" | The Super Brazil Girl | 4:20 |
| 6. | "Act Not Surprised" | | 4:48 |
| 7. | "Little Raver" | | 3:00 |
| 8. | "Collectors Inside Collection" | | 4:38 |
| 9. | "Tropical Permanent Holidays" | | 4:10 |
| 10. | "Mademoiselle Marchand" | | 4:03 |
| 11. | "Metropole" | | 6:45 |
| 12. | "The Futuristica Waltz" | | 3:39 |
| 13. | "Síndrome de Pânico" | Panic Attack | 4:24 |
| 14. | "Plastic Soda" | | 4:44 |
| 15. | "Carvão Sobre Tela" | Charcoal on Canvas | 4:12 |
| 16. | "Um Sorvete com Vocês" | An Ice Cream with You All | 4:20 |
| 17. | "A Marchinha (Reprise)" (instrumental) | The Marchinha (Reprise) | 1:49 |

=== Monstro Discos version (2008) ===
All tracks are written by Jupiter Apple.

| No. | Title | English title | Length |
|---|---|---|---|
| 1. | "A Marchinha Psicótica de Dr. Soup" | Dr. Soup's Psychotic Marchinha | 4:42 |
| 2. | "Tema de Júpiter Maçã" | Jupiter Apple's Theme | 3:54 |
| 3. | "Base Primitiva Revisitada" | Primitive Base Revisited | 3:49 |
| 4. | "As Mesmas Coisas" | The Same Stuff | 5:47 |
| 5. | "Little Raver" | | 3:00 |
| 6. | "A Menina Super Brasil" | The Super Brazil Girl | 4:20 |
| 7. | "Plataforma 6" | Platform 6 | 4:22 |
| 8. | "Síndrome de Pânico" | Panic Attack | 4:24 |
| 9. | "Na Casa de Mamãe" | At Momma's House | 6:14 |
| 10. | "Beatle George" | | 3:40 |
| 11. | "Mademoiselle Marchand" | | 4:03 |
| 12. | "Carvão Sobre Tela" | Charcoal on Canvas | 4:12 |
| 13. | "Viola de Aço" | Steel Viola | 6:15 |
| 14. | "Um Sorvete com Vocês" | An Ice Cream with You All | 4:20 |
| 15. | "A Marchinha (Reprise)" (instrumental) | The Marchinha (Reprise) | 1:49 |

== Personnel ==
- Jupiter Apple – vocals, bass guitar, electric guitar, classical guitar, electric organ, piano, drums, kazoo, percussion
- Thalita Freitas – backing vocals, percussion
- Cuca Medina – backing vocals, synth, flute
- Rodrigo Souto – drums, percussion
- Astronauta Pinguim – electric organ, Moog
- Bibiana Graeff – accordion, synth, marimba
- Luciano Bolobang – drums, percussion
- Clayton – drums
- Gustavo Dreher – flute
- Lúcio Vassaratt – sitar
- Ray-Z – electric guitar
- Zé do Trumpett – trumpet
- Thomas Dreher – production
- Gregorio Soria – cover art (2007 version)
