= Os Cascavelletes (EP) =

EP by Os Cascavelletes
- Released: 1988
- Recorded: 1988
- Genre: Rock, rockabilly, blues rock, folk rock, psychedelic rock, rock and roll
- Length: 21:53
- Label: Self-released
- Producer: Os Cascavelletes

Os Cascavelletes chronology
Vórtex Demo (1987)	Os Cascavelletes (1988)	Rock'a'ula (1989)

Os Cascavelletes is the eponymous debut EP by Brazilian rock band Os Cascavelletes, self-released in 1988. The EP contains six tracks; three ("Menstruada", "Morte por Tesão" and "Ugagogobabagô") were re-recorded from their 1987 demo tape Vórtex Demo, while the remaining were new compositions. "Estou Amando uma Mulher" became a major hit in radios of the time after extensive airplay, while "Menstruada" was forbidden to play in radios because of its sexually explicit content. Bassist Frank Jorge parted ways with the band soon after the EP's release to focus on his alternate project Graforreia Xilarmônica.

Live bonus track "Jessica Rose" would be re-recorded for the band's subsequent release, Rock'a'ula.

"Estou Amando uma Mulher" and "Morte por Tesão" were also included in SBK Records' compilation Rio Grande do Rock, released shortly afterwards the EP.

== Track listing ==
All lyrics are written by Flávio Basso and Nei Van Soria, except where noted

No.	Title	Lyrics	Length
1.	"Carro Roubado" (Stolen Car)		4:00
2.	"Morte por Tesão" (Death by Horniness)		2:53
3.	"Menstruada" (Menstruated)	Flávio Basso, Frank Jorge	3:07
4.	"Ugagogobabagô"	Flávio Basso	2:14
5.	"Estou Amando uma Mulher" (I'm Loving a Woman)	Flávio Basso	5:07

Bonus track
No.	Title	Length
6.	"Jessica Rose" (live)	4:36

== Personnel ==
- Flávio Basso – vocals, electric guitar
- Nei Van Soria – vocals, electric guitar
- Frank Jorge – bass guitar
- Alexandre "Lord" Barea – drums
