= Six Colours Frenesi =

Video by Jupiter Apple
- Released: 2014
- Recorded: November 23, 2011
- Venues: Bar Opinião, Porto Alegre
- Genres: Progressive rock, psychedelic rock
- Label: J.A.C.K. Records
- Producer: Jupiter Apple

Jupiter Apple chronology
Uma Tarde na Fruteira (2007)	Six Colours Frenesi (2014)	Apartment Jazz (2021)

Six Colours Frenesi is a live video by the Brazilian musician Jupiter Apple. It was originally recorded during a venue at the famous Bar Opinião in Porto Alegre, Rio Grande do Sul on November 23, 2011, but only released in 2014 through the musician's own label, J.A.C.K. Records (J.A.C.K. is an acronym for "Jupiter Apple Corporation and Kingdom", and was also the name of his backing band at the time).

It was the musician's final album prior to his death in the following year.

== Track listing ==
1. "Modern Kid"
2. "Querida Superhist x Mr. Frog"
3. "Síndrome de Pânico"
4. "...So You Leave the Hall"
5. "Little Raver"
6. "Beatle George"
7. "Plataforma 6"
8. "As Tortas e as Cucas"
9. "Eu e Minha Ex"
10. "A Lad and a Maid in the Bloom"
11. "Mademoiselle Marchand"
12. "Lobo da Estepe" (Os Cascavelletes cover)
13. "Lovely Riverside"
14. "Six Colours Frenesi"
15. "Calling All Bands!"
16. "Essência Interior"
17. "Head-Head"
18. "A Marchinha Psicótica de Dr. Soup"
19. "Cachorro Louco" (TNT cover)
20. "Um Lugar do Caralho"

== Personnel ==
- Jupiter Apple – lead vocals, production
- Julio Sasquatt – drums
- Julio Cascaes – electric guitar
- Felipe Faraco – bass guitar
- Astronauta Pinguim – keyboards
- Zé Roberto Muniz – photography, cover art
- Roberto Rubim – executive production
