= TNT (disambiguation) =

TNT is a high explosive.

TNT or tnt may also refer to:

== Arts and entertainment ==
=== Music ===
- TNT (Norwegian band)
  - TNT (TNT album), 1983
  - TNT (EP), 1984
- TNT (Brazilian band)
  - TNT I, their 1987 album
  - TNT II, their 1988 album
- TNT (boy group)
- T.N.T. (album), by AC/DC, 1975
  - "T.N.T." (song)
- TNT (Tortoise album), 1998
- TNT (Tanya Tucker album), 1978
- "TNT", a song by CORTIS from GreenGreen, 2026

=== Television ===
- Télévision numérique terrestre, France's digital terrestrial television network
- TNT (American TV channel), a basic cable channel with several current and former affiliates:
  - TNT Africa, a pay TV channel
  - TNT Benelux, a former pay TV channel
  - TNT Latin America
  - TNT Poland, now branded Warner TV Poland
  - TNT Romania, now branded Warner TV Romania
  - TNT Spain, now branded Warner TV Spain
  - TNT (Swedish TV channel), defunct
  - TNT Turkey, former name of TV2
  - TNT Comedy, former name of German TV channel WarnerTV Comedy
  - TNT Film, former name of German TV channel WarnerTV Film
  - TNT Serie, former name of German TV channel WarnerTV Serie
  - TNT Sports, a sports broadcasting brand
- TNT (Australian TV station)
- TNT (Russian TV channel)
- Tawag ng Tanghalan, a singing competition in the Philippines
- Tuesday Night Titans, a 1980s wrestling TV show

=== Other uses in arts and entertainment ===
- TNT (character), in DC comics
- TNT, protagonist of the 1974 film TNT Jackson
- TNT (magazine), published in UK, Australia and New Zealand
- TnT (magazine), a 1980s Tunnels & Trolls fanzine
- Transsexual News Telegraph, a magazine
- TNT Radio, a Vietnamese-language radio network originating from KVVN in San Jose, California, US

== Businesses and organizations ==
- TNT Airways, later ASL Airlines Belgium
- TNT (clothing), an Israeli fashion label
- TNT Tropang 5G, a basketball team
- Tamil New Tigers, a Sri Lankan Tamil organization
- Terror Against Terror (Hebrew: Terror Neged Terror), a terrorist organization in Israel
- PostNL, formerly TNT NV, a Dutch mail delivery company
  - Thomas Nationwide Transport, later TNT Limited, then TNT NV in 1998, an Australian company
  - TNT Express, split from TNT NV in 2011
  - Koninklijke TNT Post, the Netherlands, until 2011

== People ==
- Greg Bownds (born 1977), Australian wrestler, also known as TNT
- Savio Vega (born 1964), Puerto Rican wrestler, also known as TNT
- Gloria, Princess of Thurn and Taxis (born 1960), German noblewoman known as "Princess TNT"
- Elisabeth von Thurn und Taxis (born 1982), her daughter, also known as "Princess TNT"

== Places ==
- TNT Creek, a river in Oregon, US
- Tanjung Barat railway station, South Jakarta, Indonesia (code: TNT)
- Tarneit railway station, Victoria, Australia (code: TNT)
- Dade-Collier Training and Transition Airport, Florida, United States (IATA code: TNT)

== Science and technology ==
- TNT (cellular service), in the Philippines
- TNT (instant messenger), a messaging client
- Template Numerical Toolkit, a C++ software library
- The NeWS Toolkit, an early Unix GUI library
- RIVA TNT, a computer graphics chipset by Nvidia
- Tissue nanotransfection, in medical science
- Tunneling nanotube, in cell biology
- Typographical Number Theory, in mathematics

== Sports ==
- TNT (professional wrestling), a tag team
- TNT FC, a South Korean football club
- TNT Motorsports, a 1980s monster truck and tractor pull event promoter

== Other uses ==
- Tago nang tago (lit. 'keeping on hiding'), a Tagalog phrase for Filipinos living in the U.S. illegally
- Tornado Naked Tre, a series of motorcycles by Benelli
- Tontemboan language (ISO 639-3 code: tnt)

== See also ==
- Teenage Mutant Ninja Turtles (TMNT)
- TNTS (disambiguation)
- T&T (disambiguation)
