= Vórtex Demo =

Demo album by Os Cascavelletes
- Released: 1987
- Recorded: 1987
- Studio: Estúdio Vórtex
- Genre: Rock, rockabilly, blues rock, folk rock, psychedelic rock, rock and roll
- Length: 36:51
- Label: Self-released
- Producer: Os Cascavelletes

Os Cascavelletes chronology
Vórtex Demo (1987)	Os Cascavelletes (1988)

Vórtex Demo is the first demo tape released by Brazilian rock band Os Cascavelletes in 1987. It would attain them a massive reputation in the underground Rio Grande do Sul rock scene, and highly sexually explicit tracks such as "Estupro com Carinho", "Banana Split", "A Última Virgem" and "Morte por Tesão" became staples of their self-proclaimed style, "porno rock".

Even though the tape doesn't have an official name printed on its cover, it is commonly referred to as "Vórtex Demo" after the studio in which it was recorded, the Estúdio Vórtex, which was owned by the members of yet another influential rock band from Rio Grande do Sul, Os Replicantes.

"Pombo Surfista" is a Portuguese-language version of The Trashmen's "Surfin' Bird". "Entra Nessa" was originally written by vocalist Flávio Basso for his former project TNT. A handful of tracks from the demo would be re-recorded for the band's subsequent releases, the 1988 EP Os Cascavelletes and the 1989 full-length Rock'a'ula.

The tape closes with five bonus live tracks, recorded at one of the band's first gigs ever at Santa Cruz do Sul.

== Covers ==
Crossover/hardcore punk band Ratos de Porão covered "O Dotadão Deve Morrer" for the Brazilian release of their 1995 cover album Feijoada Acidente?.

== Track listing ==
All lyrics are written by Flávio Basso and Nei Van Soria, except where noted.

No.	Title	Lyrics	Length
1.	"Pombo Surfista" (Surfing Pigeon)	Flávio Basso	1:43
2.	"Eu Quero Estudar" (I Want to Study)	Alexandre Barea, Flávio Basso, Nei Van Soria	2:22
3.	"Minissaia sem Calcinha" (Miniskirt Without Panties)		1:55
4.	"Entra Nessa" (Get It On – TNT cover)	Charles Master, Flávio Basso	2:37
5.	"A Barata" (The Cockroach)		2:58
6.	"Estupro com Carinho" (Rape with Care)		2:13
7.	"Banana Split"	Flávio Basso	2:32
8.	"A Última Virgem" (The Last Virgin)	Alexandre Barea, Flávio Basso, Frank Jorge, Nei Van Soria	3:07
9.	"Menstruada" (Menstruating)	Flávio Basso, Frank Jorge	2:36
10.	"O Dotadão Deve Morrer" (The Stud Must Die)	Flávio Basso	3:02
11.	"Ugagogobabagô"	Flávio Basso	2:12
12.	"Morte por Tesão" (Death by Orgasm)		3:05
13.	"Chegou o Verão" (Summer's Here)		3:28
14.	"Nêga Bombom" (Bonbon Black Lady)	Flávio Basso	2:53

Bonus tracks
No.	Title	Length
15.	"Minissaia sem Calcinha" (live)	2:09
16.	"O Dotadão Deve Morrer" (live)	3:25
17.	"Darling" (live)	2:48
18.	"A Última Virgem" (live)	3:33
19.	"Morte por Tesão" (live)	3:08

== Personnel ==
- Flávio Basso – vocals, electric guitar
- Nei Van Soria – vocals, electric guitar
- Frank Jorge – bass guitar
- Alexandre Barea – drums
