= TNT I =

TNT

Studio album by TNT
- Released: 1987
- Genre: Rock and roll, rockabilly, hard rock, country rock, folk rock
- Length: 41:02
- Label: RCA Records
- Producer: Reinaldo B. Brito

TNT chronology
TNT (1987)	TNT (1988)

TNT, also referred to as TNT I, is the debut album by the eponymous Brazilian rock band TNT, the first of their two self-titled albums. It was released in 1987 through RCA Records, and is considered a cornerstone of the Rio Grande do Sul rock scene from the mid-1980s/early 1990s. A critical and commercial success, it spawned a handful of hits, such as "Entra Nessa", "Estou na Mão", "Ana Banana" and "Identidade Zero" (all of them co-written by former vocalist Flávio Basso, prior to his departure from the band), which catapulted the group into nationwide fame and paved their way for a second release one year later.

The album's cover art was allegedly inspired by New Order's 1983 release Power, Corruption & Lies.

== Covers ==
"Entra Nessa" was covered by former vocalist Flávio Basso's subsequent project, Os Cascavelletes, around the same time the album was released, on their first demo tape Vórtex Demo.

== Track listing ==
All tracks are written by Charles Master and Flávio Basso, except for "Me Dá o Cigarro" by Master, Márcio Petracco and Luís Henrique "Tchê" Gomes

No.	Title	English title	Length
1.	"Ana Banana"		3:53
2.	"FEBEM"		3:32
3.	"Rateação"	Meddling	2:56
4.	"Identidade Zero"	Zero Identity	4:11
5.	"Oh, Debby!"		3:53
6.	"Liga Essa Bomba"	Turn This Bomb On	2:49
7.	"Cachorro Louco"	Mad Dog	3:47
8.	"Desse Jeito"	This Way	3:04
9.	"Entra Nessa"	Get It On	2:54
10.	"Estou na Mão"	I'm All by Myself	3:24
11.	"Me Dá o Cigarro"	Give Me the Cigarette	3:17
12.	"Não Quero Mais te Ver"	I Don't Want to See You Again	3:19

== Personnel ==
- Charles Master – vocals, bass guitar
- Márcio Petracco – electric guitar
- Luís Henrique "Tchê" Gomes – electric guitar
- Felipe Jotz – drums
- Reinaldo B. Brito – production
