= Alexandre Birck =

Brazilian drummer (born 1967)

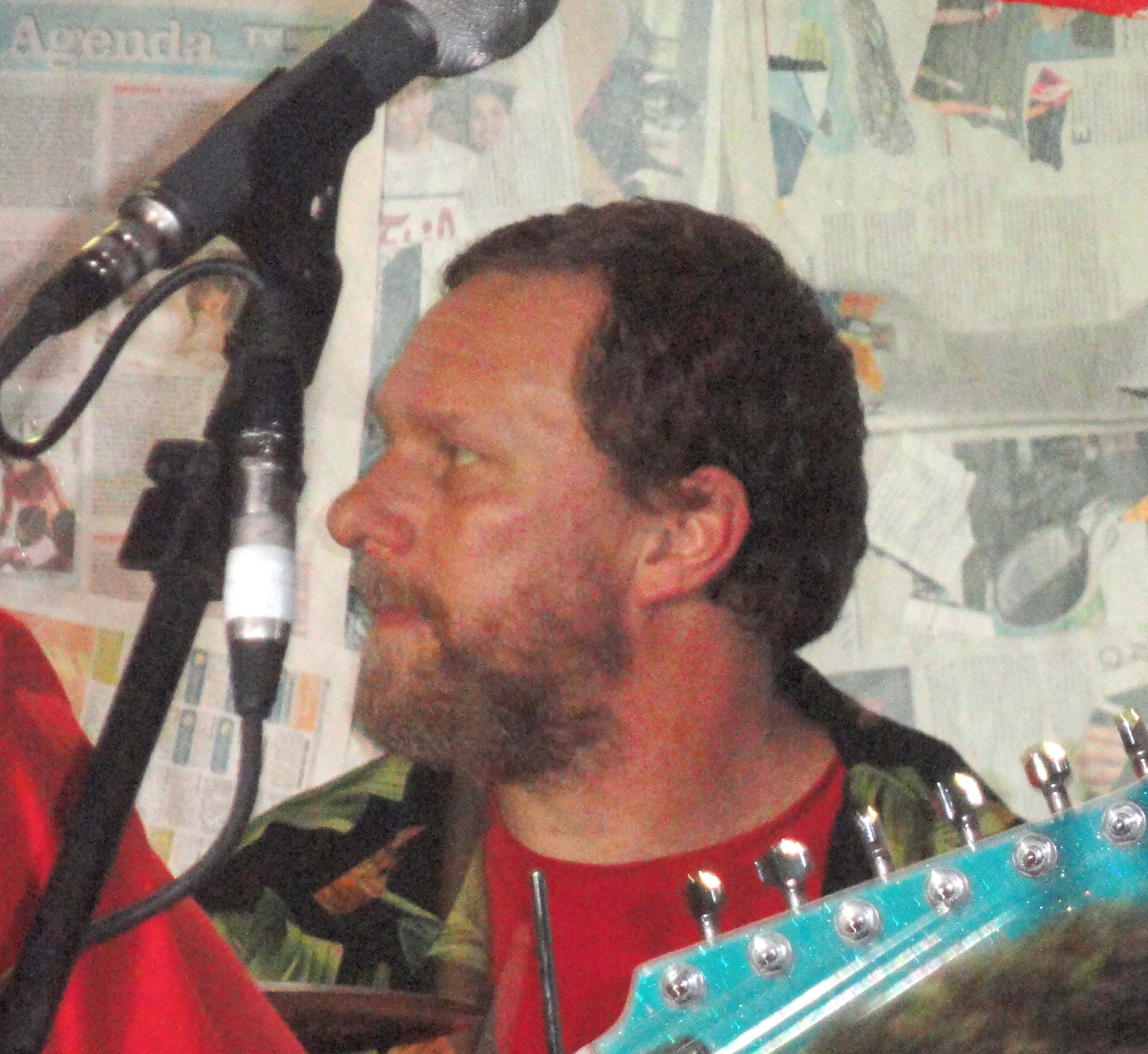
- Birck in 2013

Background information
- Also known as: Alexandre Ograndi
- Born: Alexandre de Campos Velho Birck; November 10, 1967 (age 58); Porto Alegre, Rio Grande do Sul, Brazil
- Genres: Rock, pop rock, experimental rock, alternative rock
- Occupation: Musician
- Instrument: Drums
- Years active: 1983–present
- Labels: Banguela Records, Zoon Records, Grenal Records

Alexandre de Campos Velho Birck (born November 10, 1967) is a Brazilian drummer best known for his work with influential rock band Graforreia Xilarmônica. During the band's early years, he was known by the stage name Alexandre Ograndi.

== Biography ==
Birck was born in Porto Alegre, Rio Grande do Sul, on November 10, 1967. He is the nephew of both screenwriter and theater director Carlos Augusto de Campos Velho (better known as Jota Pingo) and film and television actor Paulo César Pereio, and his mother, Rosa Maria de Campos Velho, was the director of the Teatro de Arena de Porto Alegre.

In 1983, alongside his older brother Marcelo Birck, future TNT guitarist Luís "Tchê" Gomes and future Os Cascavelletes bassist Frank Jorge, Alexandre was part of the short-lived band Prisão de Ventre, which lasted only for two years. In 1987 he reunited with his brother and Jorge to form, alongside Carlo Pianta, the cult band Graforreia Xilarmônica. After releasing two critically acclaimed albums, Coisa de Louco II (1995) and Chapinhas de Ouro (1998), they broke up in 2000, but reunited after a 5-year hiatus.

In 1988 the Birck brothers founded Aristóteles de Ananias Jr., a side project to Graforreia Xilarmônica, alongside Luciano Zanatta, Diego Silveira and Chico Machado. They have released a single, self-titled studio album in 1996 before disbanding the following year.

For a short time in 1998 Alexandre served as a session musician for experimental rock band DeFalla, and was also part of the country/blues rock ensemble Os Daltons. He also gave lectures on music theory at Unisinos around the mid-2000s.

== Discography ==
=== With Graforreia Xilarmônica ===
For a more comprehensive list, see Graforreia Xilarmônica#Discography

Year	Album
1995	Coisa de Louco II: Label: Banguela Records; Format: CD
1998	Chapinhas de Ouro: Label: Zoon Records; Format: CD

=== With Aristóteles de Ananias Jr. ===
Year	Album
1996	Aristóteles de Ananias Jr.: Label: Grenal Records; Format: CD
