= Marcelo Birck =

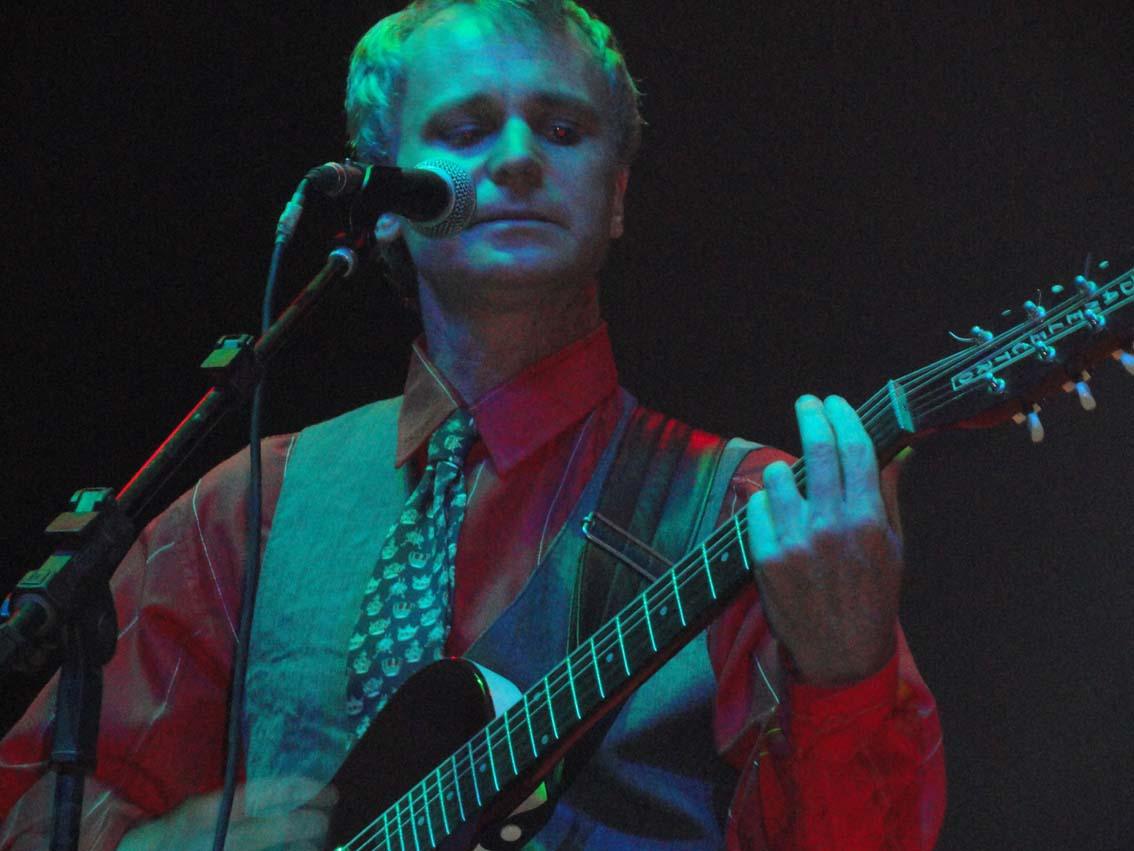
- Birck in 2013
- Born: Marcelo de Campos Velho Birck; August 13, 1965 (age 61); Porto Alegre, Rio Grande do Sul, Brazil
- Education: Federal University of Rio Grande do Sul; Federal University of Goiás
- Occupations: Singer-songwriter, lyricist, guitarist
- Years active: 1983–present
- Musical career
- Genres: Rock, pop rock, experimental rock, alternative rock, indie rock
- Instruments: Vocals, electric guitar
- Labels: Banguela Records, Zoon Records, Grenal Records

Marcelo de Campos Velho Birck (born August 13, 1965) is a Brazilian singer-songwriter, lyricist, arranger and guitarist, best known for his work with influential rock band Graforreia Xilarmônica.

== Biography ==
Birck was born in Porto Alegre, Rio Grande do Sul, on August 13, 1965. He is the nephew of both screenwriter and theater director Carlos Augusto de Campos Velho (better known as Jota Pingo) and film and television actor Paulo César Pereio, and his mother, Rosa Maria de Campos Velho, was the director of the Teatro de Arena de Porto Alegre. Having a penchant for music and arts since his youth, Birck later graduated in music from the Federal University of Rio Grande do Sul, and then obtained a master's degree in music education at the Federal University of Goiás.

In 1983, alongside his younger brother Alexandre Birck, future TNT guitarist Luís "Tchê" Gomes and future Os Cascavelletes bassist Frank Jorge, Marcelo formed the short-lived band Prisão de Ventre, which lasted only for two years. In 1987, he reunited with his brother and Jorge to form, alongside Carlo Pianta, the cult band Graforreia Xilarmônica. After releasing two critically acclaimed albums, Coisa de Louco II (1995) and Chapinhas de Ouro (1998), they broke up in 2000, but reunited after a 5-year hiatus.

In 1988, Birck founded a more experimental and "performatic" side project to Graforreia Xilarmônica, named Aristóteles de Ananias Jr., alongside names such as Luciano Zanatta, Diego Silveira and Chico Machado. They have released a single, self-titled studio album in 1996 before disbanding the following year.

In 2000 Birck teamed up with Thomas Dreher and Felipe Faraco to form Os Atonais; their first (and so far only) studio album, Em Amplitude Moderada, came out the same year, amid overwhelmingly positive reviews. Later that year he released his first, self-titled solo album. A follow-up, Timbres Não Mentem Jamais, came out in 2008.

Birck has also collaborated with Jupiter Apple on his 1997 debut A Sétima Efervescência, arranging one of the musician's most well-known songs, "Eu e Minha Ex". He later returned for its 1999 follow-up Plastic Soda. In 2009 he was a guest musician on Rogério Skylab's live album Skylab IX; he and Skylab (a huge fan of Birck) wrote together the song "Samba de uma Nota Só ao Contrário". From 2002 to 2003 he served as a lecturer of musical analysis for the Santa Catarina State University.

== Discography ==
=== With Graforreia Xilarmônica ===
For a more comprehensive list, see Graforreia Xilarmônica#Discography

Year	Album
1995	Coisa de Louco II: Label: Banguela Records; Format: CD
1998	Chapinhas de Ouro: Label: Zoon Records; Format: CD

=== With Aristóteles de Ananias Jr. ===
Year	Album
1996	Aristóteles de Ananias Jr.: Label: Grenal Records; Format: CD

=== With Os Atonais ===
Year	Album
2000	Em Amplitude Moderada: Label: Grenal Records; Format: CD

=== Solo ===
Year	Album
2000	Marcelo Birck: Label: Grenal Records; Format: CD
2008	Timbres Não Mentem Jamais: Label: Grenal Records; Format: CD

=== Guest appearances ===
Jupiter Apple

- 1997: A Sétima Efervescência (orchestral arrangements in "Eu e Minha Ex")
- 1999: Plastic Soda (electric guitar and arrangements in "The True Love of the Spider")

Rogério Skylab

- 2009: Skylab IX (lyrics, additional vocals and electric guitar in "Samba de uma Nota Só ao Contrário")
