= A Sétima Efervescência =

Studio album by Jupiter Apple
- Released: 1997
- Recorded: August 1996
- Studio: Estúdio ACIT
- Genres: Progressive rock, psychedelic rock, space rock, garage rock, folk rock
- Length: 1:03:27
- Labels: Antídoto (original version); Monstro Discos (2018 re-issue)
- Producers: Jupiter Apple, Egisto Dal Santo

Jupiter Apple chronology
A Sétima Efervescência (1997)	Plastic Soda (1999)

A Sétima Efervescência (Portuguese for "The Seventh Effervescence") is the debut solo album by the Brazilian musician and former TNT and Os Cascavelletes member Flávio Basso, also known as Júpiter Maçã or Jupiter Apple. It was released in 1997 by independent label Antídoto, and counted with guest appearances by Basso's former Os Cascavelletes bandmates Frank Jorge and Alexandre Barea, and by Graforreia Xilarmônica guitarist Marcelo Birck, who contributed with the musical arrangements for the track "Eu e Minha Ex". Many tracks which appeared on the album were re-recorded from Basso's 1995 demo tape with Os Pereiras Azuiz, Orgasmo Legal.

A music video was made for "Miss Lexotan 6mg Garota".

The album was fully remastered and re-issued in vinyl format in April 2018 by Monstro Discos, to celebrate what would have been Basso's 50th birthday on January 26.

== Covers and appearances in other media ==
Rogério Skylab covered "Eu e Minha Ex" for his 2016 live album Trilogia dos Carnavais: 25 Anos de Carreira ou de Lápide, while Wander Wildner covered "Um Lugar do Caralho" for his 1996 solo debut Baladas Sangrentas. Rock band Ira! covered "Miss Lexotan 6mg Garota" for their 1998 album Você Não Sabe Quem Eu Sou.

Jupiter Apple himself re-recorded "Um Lugar do Caralho" for the soundtrack of the 2006 animated film Wood & Stock: Sexo, Orégano e Rock'n'Roll. "Querida Superhist x Mr. Frog", "Canção para Dormir" and "The Freaking Alice (Hippie Under Groove)" also appear in the film's soundtrack. In 2015, "Um Lugar do Caralho" would be included in the soundtrack of the telenovela Verdades Secretas.

== Critical reception ==
A Sétima Efervescência was lauded by critics upon its release, who praised its 1960s-influenced psychedelic sound comparable to the works of Pink Floyd, Syd Barrett and The Beatles (all of them huge influences on Basso's own work). In 2007, Rolling Stone Brasil included it on their list of 100 Greatest Brazilian Music Records, in 96th place. Brazilian magazine Aplauso chose it as the best gaúcho rock album, also in 2007.

== Track listing ==
All tracks are written by Jupiter Apple, except for "Canção para Dormir" by Jupiter Apple and Egisto Dal Santo.

No.	Title	English title	Length
1.	"Um Lugar do Caralho"	A Hell of a Place	4:58
2.	"As Tortas e as Cucas"	The Pies and the Noggins	4:37
3.	"Querida Superhist x Mr. Frog"	Dear Superhist x Mr. Frog	5:38
4.	"Pictures and Paintings"		3:09
5.	"Eu e Minha Ex"	My Ex and Me	5:52
6.	"Walter Victor"		3:41
7.	"As Outras que Me Querem"	The Others Who Want Me	2:41
8.	"Sociedades Humanoides Fantásticas"	Fantastic Humanoid Societies	6:40
9.	"O Novo Namorado"	The New Boyfriend	3:12
10.	"Miss Lexotan 6mg Garota"	Miss Lexotan 6mg Girl	4:55
11.	"The Freaking Alice (Hippie Under Groove)"		5:07
12.	"Essência Interior"	Inner Essence	6:58
13.	"Canção para Dormir"	Sleeping Song	3:14
14.	"A Sétima Efervescência Intergaláctica"	The Seventh Intergalactic Effervescence	2:39

== Personnel ==
- Jupiter Apple – lead vocals, electric guitar, classical guitar, craviola, harmonica, percussion, production, mixing, cover art
- Glauco Caruso – drums
- Emerson Caruso – bass guitar
- Frank Jorge – keyboards (tracks 1 and 9)
- Alexandre Barea – drums (track 8)
- Marcelo Birck – orchestral arrangements (track 5)
- Egisto Dal Santo – mandolin, backing vocals, production, mixing
- Jefferson Gross – cello (track 5)
- Hein Wentz – violin (track 5)
- Ricardo Frantz – violin (track 5)
- Luciano Zanatta – alto sax (track 5)
- Evandro Matté – trumpet (track 5)
- Adolfo Almeida Júnior – bassoon (track 5)
- Cristina Birck – cello (track 5)
- Thomas Dreher – mastering
- Gustavo Dreher – recording, mixing, flute (tracks 2, 10 and 13), vocals (track 5), arrangements (track 10 and 13)
