= KTO Arena =

- Interactive map of KTO Arena
- Former names: Pepsi On Stage
- Address: Av. Severo Dullius, 1995; Porto Alegre; Brazil
- Location: São João
- Coordinates: 29.98777°S 51.17765°W
- Operator: Opinião Produtora
- Capacity: 5,500

Construction
- Opened: May 2006
- Renovated: June 2025

KTO Arena, formerly known as Pepsi on Stage (2006–2026), is a music venue in the city of Porto Alegre, Brazil. It is located in the neighborhood of São João, near Salgado Filho International Airport. The venue is one of the best-known concert halls in southern Brazil and became widely recognized throughout the country under its former name, Pepsi on Stage.

== About ==
The venue opened in 2006 as Pepsi on Stage, becoming the first mid-sized entertainment arena developed under PepsiCo's venue branding strategy in Brazil. It was built and has been operated by the same company that manages Bar Opinião, and hosts concerts as well as conferences, award ceremonies, corporate events, graduation ceremonies, and product launches. The project was part of Pepsi's expansion of entertainment venues bearing its brand, alongside facilities such as the Pepsi Stage in Amsterdam, the Pepsi Arena in Albany, and the Pepsi Coliseum in Indianapolis.

In 2026, following the end of the naming rights agreement with PepsiCo, the venue was renamed KTO Arena under a new naming rights agreement with KTO, a Brazilian online sports betting and casino operator.

== Noted performers ==
- Akon
- Alanis Morissette
- Alice In Chains
- Anitta
- Anberlin
- Arcade Fire
- Avenged Sevenfold
- Banda Calypso
- Ben Harper
- Biohazard
- Bob Dylan
- Beth Carvalho
- Black Eyed Peas
- Brujeria
- Caetano Veloso
- Chuck Berry
- The Cranberries
- Creed
- Demi Lovato
- Donavon Frankenreiter
- Dream Theater
- Evanescence
- Faith No More
- Fifth Harmony
- Fito Páez
- Franz Ferdinand
- Matanza
- Megadeth
- Dream Theater
- Joss Stone
- Lauryn Hill
- Legião Urbana
- Lulu Santos
- Maná
- Matisyahu
- Moby
- NOFX
- The Offspring
- Paralamas do Sucesso
- Paramore
- Placebo
- Queens of the Stone Age
- RBD
- RebeldeS
- Rouge
- Simple Plan
- Slash
- Stratovarius
