= Carlo Pianta =

Brazilian musician

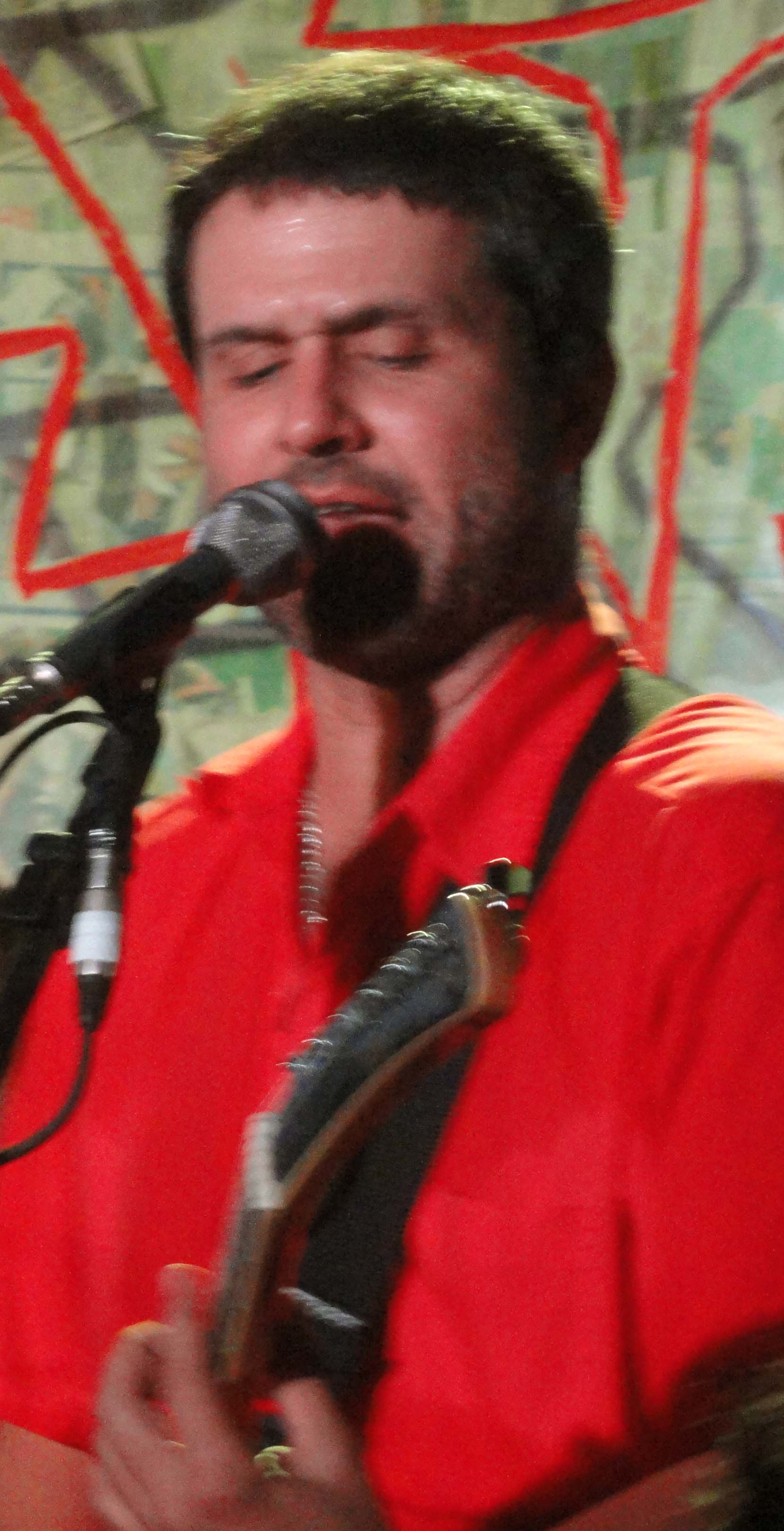
- Pianta in 2013
- Born: Carlo Machado Pianta; April 2, 1967 (age 59); Porto Alegre, Rio Grande do Sul, Brazil
- Education: Federal University of Rio Grande do Sul
- Occupations: Singer-songwriter, guitarist, bassist
- Years active: 1985–present
- Musical career
- Genres: Rock, experimental rock, alternative rock
- Instruments: Vocals, electric guitar, bass guitar
- Labels: Banguela Records, Zoon Records

Carlo Machado Pianta (born April 2, 1967) is a Brazilian singer-songwriter, guitarist and bassist best known for being a founding member of two of the most important rock bands from Rio Grande do Sul during the mid-1980s: DeFalla and Graforreia Xilarmônica.

== Biography ==
Carlo Pianta was born in Porto Alegre, Rio Grande do Sul, on April 2, 1967. He graduated in music from the Federal University of Rio Grande do Sul. In 1985 he founded, alongside Edu K. and Biba Meira, the experimental rock group DeFalla (initially called Fluxo, but renamed DeFalla by Pianta's suggestion as a tribute to Spanish composer Manuel de Falla), but left the group in 1987, before the release of their debut album. Shortly afterwards he teamed up with brothers Alexandre and Marcelo Birck, and with then-Os Cascavelletes bassist Frank Jorge, to form Graforreia Xilarmônica; throughout the late 1980s to the late 1990s, the band released a demo tape and two studio albums, all three being critically acclaimed, but eventually broke up in 2000. After a 5-year hiatus, Graforreia Xilarmônica reunited, with Pianta returning as their guitarist. In 1993, he was a guest musician on the debut demo tape by Aristóteles de Ananias Jr., a side project to Graforreia Xilarmônica founded by the Birck brothers in 1988.

During Graforreia Xilarmônica's hiatus, Pianta was a live musician for Júlio Reny's band, and formed the short-lived projects Ceres and Os Ascensoristas. In 2016 he temporarily returned to DeFalla as a session member on their album Monstro, after being a live musician for them again in 2015.

Pianta also gave music lectures at the Colégio IPA in Porto Alegre.

== Discography ==
=== With Graforreia Xilarmônica ===
For a more comprehensive list, see Graforreia Xilarmônica#Discography

Year	Album
1995	Coisa de Louco II: Label: Banguela Records; Format: CD
1998	Chapinhas de Ouro: Label: Zoon Records; Format: CD
