= Rock'a'ula =

Studio album by Os Cascavelletes
- Released: 1989
- Recorded: 1989
- Genre: Rock, rockabilly, blues rock, folk rock, psychedelic rock, rock and roll
- Length: 42:58
- Label: Odeon Records
- Producer: Dé Palmeira

Os Cascavelletes chronology
Os Cascavelletes (1988)	Rock'a'ula (1989)

Rock'a'ula is the only studio album by Brazilian rock band Os Cascavelletes, released in 1989 by Odeon Records. Produced by former Barão Vermelho bassist Dé Palmeira, it is considered a seminal work of the Rio Grande do Sul rock scene of the mid-1980s/early 1990s and spawned numerous hits which were very popular at the time of their release and are still remembered to this day, such as "Jessica Rose" (which originally appeared as a live bonus track on the band's 1988 self-titled EP), the infamous "Eu Quis Comer Você", "Lobo da Estepe" (which was inspired by Hermann Hesse's 1927 novel Steppenwolf) and "Nêga Bombom", included in the soundtrack of the 1989–90 Rede Globo telenovela Top Model. It was the band's first release with keyboardist Humberto Petinelli and without original bassist Frank Jorge, who left them the year prior to focus on his other project, Graforreia Xilarmônica.

The album's title is a possible reference to Elvis Presley's 1961 song "Rock-A-Hula Baby".

== Track listing ==
All lyrics are written by Flávio Basso and Nei Van Soria, except where noted.

No.	Title	Lyrics	Length
1.	"Gato Preto" (Black Cat)		4:24
2.	"Moto" (Motorcycle)		4:18
3.	"Jessica Rose"		4:30
4.	"Sorte no Jogo e Azar no Amor" (Lucky in the Game and Unlucky in Love)		4:07
5.	"Nêga Bombom" (Bonbon Black Lady)	Flávio Basso	3:36
6.	"D.I.S.C.O. (A Garota da Rua)" (D.I.S.C.O. [The Street Girl])	Alexandre Barea, Flávio Basso, Nei Van Soria	3:44
7.	"Banco de Trás de um Cadillac" (A Cadillac's Backseat)		4:37
8.	"Eu Quis Comer Você" (I Wanted to Fuck You)	Alexandre Barea, Flávio Basso, Nei Van Soria	3:55
9.	"Cão e Cadela" (Dog and Bitch)		3:03
10.	"Baby Satanás" (Satan Baby)		3:03
11.	"Lobo da Estepe" (Steppe Wolf)		3:45

== Personnel ==
- Flávio Basso – vocals, electric guitar
- Nei Van Soria – vocals, electric guitar
- Luciano Albo – bass guitar
- Alexandre "Lord" Barea – drums
- Humberto "Bluesman" Petinelli – keyboards
- Dé Palmeira – production
- Jorge Davidson – art direction
