= Juli Manzi =

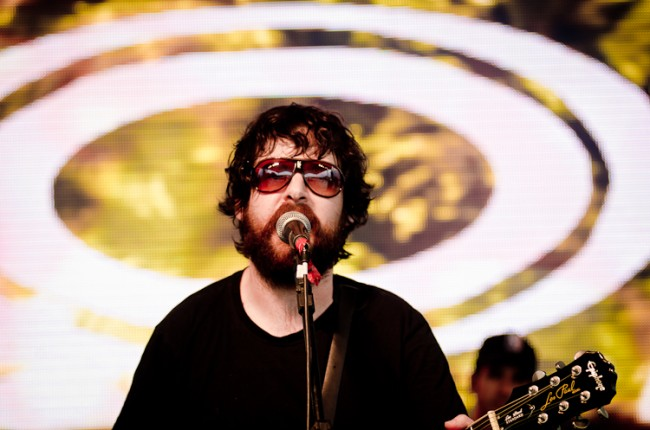
- Manzi in 2011
- Born: Giuliano Tosin; April 14, 1976 (age 50); Porto Alegre, Rio Grande do Sul, Brazil
- Occupations: Singer-songwriter, lyricist, guitarist
- Years active: 1999–present
- Notable work: A Odisseia: Memórias e Devaneios de Jupiter Apple
- Musical career
- Genres: Rock, psychedelic rock, art rock, pop rock
- Instruments: Vocals, electric guitar
- Label: Tratore
- Website: julimanzi.com.br

Giuliano Tosin (born April 14, 1976), better known by his stage name Juli Manzi, is a Brazilian musician and biographer.

== Biography ==
Juli Manzi was born in Porto Alegre on April 14, 1976. He has a brother, Giancarlo, a physicist at the Laboratório Nacional de Luz Síncrotron. He graduated in journalism from the Federal University of Rio Grande do Sul. During his youth, he played for rock bands Los Bassetas and Colono Escocês and wrote poems for his college newspapers. It wasn't until 1999 when he released his solo debut album, 340 Exigências de Camarim, which was a critical and commercial success and awarded him a nomination to the Prêmio Açorianos. His second album, Todo o Perfex, came out in 2002.

After an eight-year hiatus from music, Manzi moved to São Paulo in 2010, where he formed the group Coletivo Absoluto alongside Rodrigo Caldas, his former Colono Escocês bandmate Oliveira de Araújo and Marcelo Pianinho of Mundo Livre S/A. Their first and so far only self-titled album came out the same year.

In 2012 he released his third solo album, Ponto Cego, which counted with guest appearances by Frank Jorge and Maurício Pereira. In 2015 Manzi returned to Porto Alegre for the first time in two years to promote his then-upcoming fourth album, O Plano Transcendental. His fifth and most recent album, Sambas, Pagodes e Uá-Uás, came out in 2018.

He also co-wrote the semi-fictional autobiography of his life-long friend Flávio Basso (better known as Jupiter Apple), A Odisseia: Memórias e Devaneios de Jupiter Apple, which was published the year following Basso's death, in 2016.

== Discography ==
=== Solo ===
Year	Album
1999	340 Exigências de Camarim: Label: Self-released; Format: CD
2002	Todo o Perfex: Label: Self-released; Format: CD
2012	Ponto Cego: Label: Tratore; Format: CD
2015	O Plano Transcendental: Label: Tratore; Format: CD
2018	Sambas, Pagodes e Uá-Uás: Label: Tratore; Format: CD

=== With Coletivo Absoluto ===
Year	Album
2010	Coletivo Absoluto: Label: Tratore; Format: CD

== Bibliography ==
- A Odisseia: Memórias e Devaneios de Jupiter Apple (Azougue Editorial, 2016; co-written with Flávio Basso)
