= TNTS =

TNTS may refer to:

- Tagum National Trade School, Tagum, Davao del Norte, Davao, Mindanao, Philippines
- Tanza National Trade School, Tanza, Cavite, Calabarzon, Luzon, Philippines
- The Needles the Space, a 2007 album by Straylight Run
- TNNT1, a troponin protein and gene also called "TNTS"

== See also ==
- TNT (disambiguation), for the singular of TNTs
