= Noite Vem, Noite Vai =

Studio album by TNT
- Released: 1991
- Genre: Rock music; pop rock
- Label: RCA Records
- Producer: Reinaldo B. Brito

TNT chronology
TNT (1988)	Noite Vem, Noite Vai (1991)	TNT ao Vivo (2004)

Noite Vem, Noite Vai (Portuguese for "Night Comes, Night Goes") is the third studio album by the Brazilian rock band TNT, released in 1991 through RCA Records. It was the band's final album to come out through RCA, their final release prior to their break-up three years later, their first one without original drummer Felipe Jotz (who was replaced by Paulo Arcari) and their only one with keyboardist João Maldonado.

In Noite Vem, Noite Vai, TNT abandoned the rockabilly-inflected sonority of their previous releases, heading towards a more traditional pop rock direction with more introspective and "mature" lyrics. This new musical direction heavily alienated former fans, and thus the album was not very well received at the time of its release.

TNT reunited in 2003 and released a fourth and final album, Um por Todos ou Todos por Um, in 2005, before breaking up again in 2007.

== Track listing ==
All tracks are written by Charles Master and Luís Henrique "Tchê" Gomes, except for "Paz no Seu Coração" by Master, Gomes and João Maldonado; "Não Tenho Medo da Vida", "Estou Louco por Você" and "Deus Quis" by Gomes; and "Vacilou" by Master and Márcio Petracco

No.	Title	English title	Length
1.	"Quem Procura, Acha"	Who Looks for It Will Find It	4:00
2.	"Nunca Mais Voltar"	Never to Come Back	4:33
3.	"Paz no Seu Coração"	Peace in Your Heart	5:24
4.	"Não Tenho Medo da Vida"	I'm Not Afraid of Life	3:17
5.	"Estou Louco por Você"	I'm Crazy About You	2:47
6.	"Amigo Meu"	A Friend of Mine	4:09
7.	"Vacilou"	You Messed Up	3:40
8.	"Noite Vem, Noite Vai"	Night Comes, Night Goes	4:07
9.	"Daqui pra Frente"	From Now On	3:22
10.	"Deus Quis"	God Wanted It	4:06

== Personnel ==
- Charles Master – vocals, bass guitar
- Márcio Petracco – electric guitar
- Luís Henrique "Tchê" Gomes – electric guitar
- Paulo Arcari – drums
- João Maldonado – keyboards
- Reinaldo B. Brito – production
- Miguel Plopschi – art direction
