= Jupiter Apple and Bibmo Presents: Bitter =

Studio album by Jupiter Apple and Bibmo
- Released: February 2007
- Genre: Progressive rock, psychedelic rock, folk rock
- Length: 59:14
- Label: Monstro Discos
- Producer: Jupiter Apple, Bibmo, André Brasil

Jupiter Apple chronology
Hisscivilization (2002)	Jupiter Apple and Bibmo Presents: Bitter (2007)	Uma Tarde na Fruteira (2007)

Jupiter Apple and Bibmo Presents: Bitter (also referred to by its shortened name Bitter) is a collaborative album between the Brazilian musicians Jupiter Apple and Bibiana "Bibmo" Morena, who also was his domestic partner at the time. It was released in February 2007 by Goiânia-based independent label Monstro Discos as a prelude to the musician's then-upcoming album Uma Tarde na Fruteira, scheduled to be released later that year by Elefant Records in Spain. Its raw, stripped-down sonority which contrasts with Jupiter Apple's previous releases was influenced by the likes of David Bowie, The Rolling Stones, The Stooges, Bob Dylan and The Kinks.

"Exactly" was re-recorded from Hisscivilization.

== Track listing ==
All lyrics are written by Jupiter Apple and Bibmo (except where noted); all music is composed by Jupiter Apple and Bibmo

No.	Title	Lyrics	Length
1.	"Heat and Beat"	Jupiter Apple, Lucas Hanke	4:34
2.	"Clowns"		3:05
3.	"(Sometimes) Fire-Heading Man"		2:55
4.	"Any Job"		3:39
5.	"Deep"		14:06
6.	"Golden Light"		6:48
7.	"Who's the Dragon?"		4:03
8.	"Seventy Man"	Jupiter Apple, Lucas Hanke	4:13
9.	"Lovely Riverside"	Jupiter Apple	4:56
10.	"Exactly"	Jupiter Apple	5:56
11.	"Down Myth Girl"	Jupiter Apple	4:54

== Personnel ==
- Jupiter Apple – lead vocals, electric guitar, classical guitar, keyboards, percussion, production
- Bibiana "Bibmo" Morena – additional vocals, electric guitar, classical guitar
- Lucas Hanke – electric guitar, bass guitar
- Ray-Z – electric guitar
- Ed Dolzan – drums, percussion
- André Brasil – production
