= Skygirls (album) =

Studio album by Rogério Skylab and Leandra Lambert
- Released: 2009
- Recorded: May 2009
- Studio: Estúdio Cia. dos Técnicos
- Genre: Experimental rock; art rock; noise rock; electronica
- Length: 1:31:01
- Label: Psicotropicodelia
- Producer: Solange Venturi

Rogério Skylab chronology
Rogério Skylab & Orquestra Zé Felipe (2009)	Skygirls (2009)	The Best of Rogério Skylab (2010)

Skygirls is a collaborative album between Brazilian musicians Rogério Skylab and Leandra "Voz del Fuego" Lambert, famous for her work with bands such as Inhumanoids! and Lingerie Underground. Featuring a guest appearance by Onno bassist Eliza Schinner, the album was released in 2009 through the independent label Psicotropicodelia.

An electronica-inflected release strongly inspired by the works of the Franco-British band Stereolab, Skylab has stated that it is one of his favorite albums and he was very proud of making it.

The album can be downloaded for free on Skylab's official website.

== Track listing ==
All tracks are written by Rogério Skylab, except for "La Mer" by Charles Trenet; "Ah! Melody" by Jean-Claude Vannier and Serge Gainsbourg; and "Na Casa de Mamãe" by Jupiter Apple.

No.	Title	English title	Length
1.	"A Tela"	The Canvas	5:39
2.	"Abacaxi"	Pineapple	6:08
3.	"Deixa Ficar"	Let It Stay	4:11
4.	"Eu Me Contradisse ou Não Me Contradisse?"	Did I Contradict Myself or Didn't I Contradict Myself?	10:00
5.	"Eu Penso Nela Sempre"	I Always Think of Her	3:15
6.	"O Sol"	The Sun	6:09
7.	"Você Viu Cat Power?"	Have You Seen Cat Power?	6:46
8.	"Ilha de Lesbos"	Island of Lesbos	10:16
9.	"La Mer" (Charles Trenet cover)	The Sea	4:36
10.	"Skygirls"		3:44
11.	"Na Casa de Mamãe" (Jupiter Apple cover)	At Momma's House	5:35
12.	"Na Festa do Meu Apê"	At the Party at My Apartment	6:27
13.	"Ah! Melody" (Serge Gainsbourg cover)		2:25
14.	"O que Eu Quero"	What I Want	4:07
15.	"Maria Bethânia"		1:26
16.	"Tudo É Tão Bom, Tudo É Tão Mau"	Everything's So Good, Everything's So Bad	4:41
17.	"Vazio Bom"	Good Void	5:21

== Personnel ==
- Rogério Skylab – vocals
- Leandra "Voz del Fuego" Lambert – vocals, programming (track 16), keyboard
- Thiago Martins – electric guitar
- Bruno Coelho – drums
- Eliza Schinner – bass guitar
- Solange Venturi – production, photography
- Flávio Lazarino – cover art
