= São João, Porto Alegre =

São José Vila São José
- Neighbourhood (bairro)
- Etymology: Named after Saint Joseph (São José)
- Nickname: Vila São José
- Interactive map of São José
- Location in Rio Grande do Sul São José (Brazil)
- Coordinates: 30°04′05″S 51°09′59″W
- Country: Brazil
- State: Rio Grande do Sul
- Municipality: Porto Alegre
- Created: 7 December 1959 (Law 2022)
- Time zone: UTC−3 (BRT)
- Area code: 51

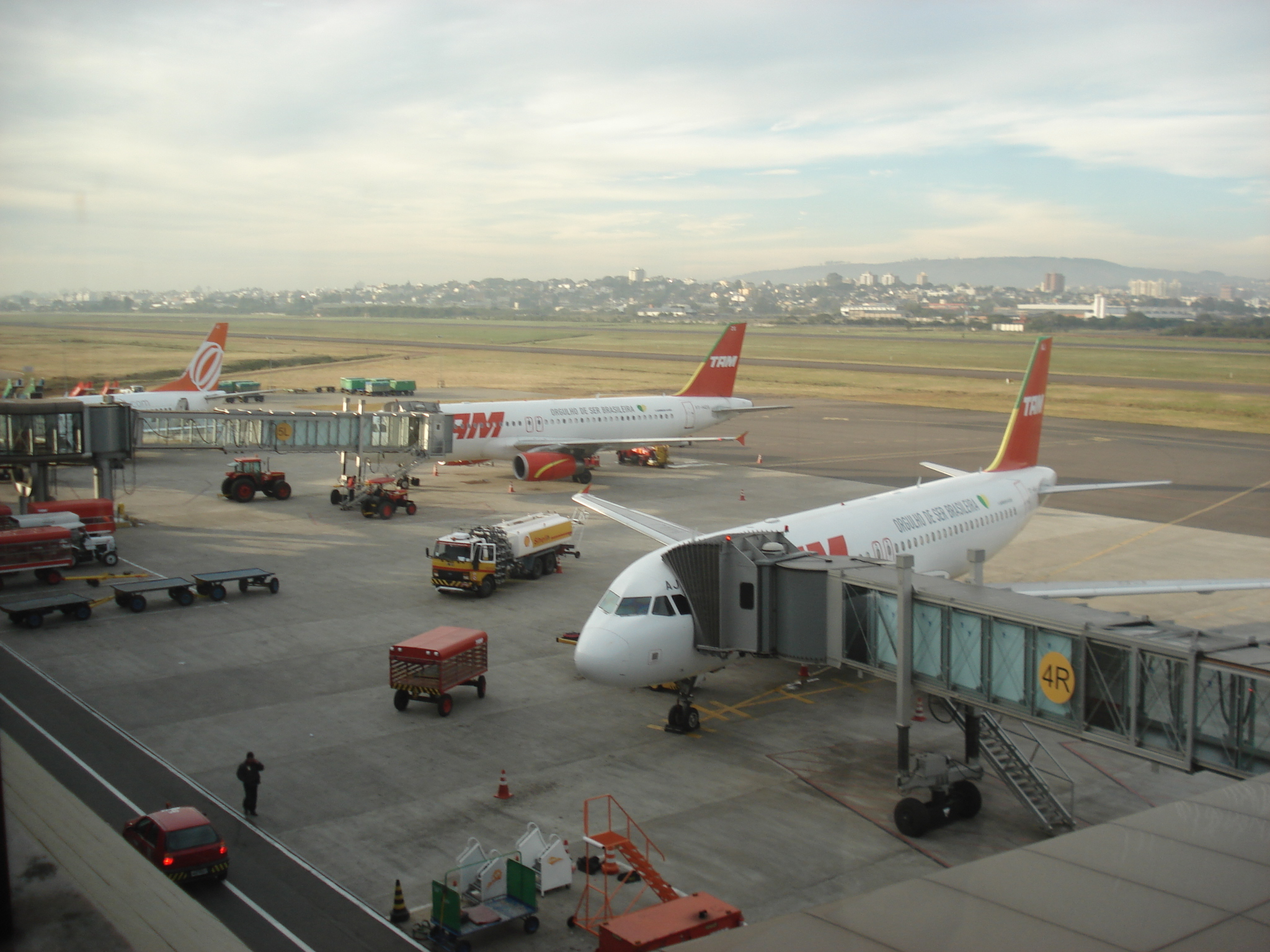
Salgado Filho Airport.

São João is a neighbourhood (bairro) in the city of Porto Alegre, the state capital of Rio Grande do Sul, in Brazil. It was created by Law 2022 from December 7, 1959.

The Salgado Filho International Airport is located here.

In 2000, there were 13,238 people living in São João.
