= Nei Van Soria =

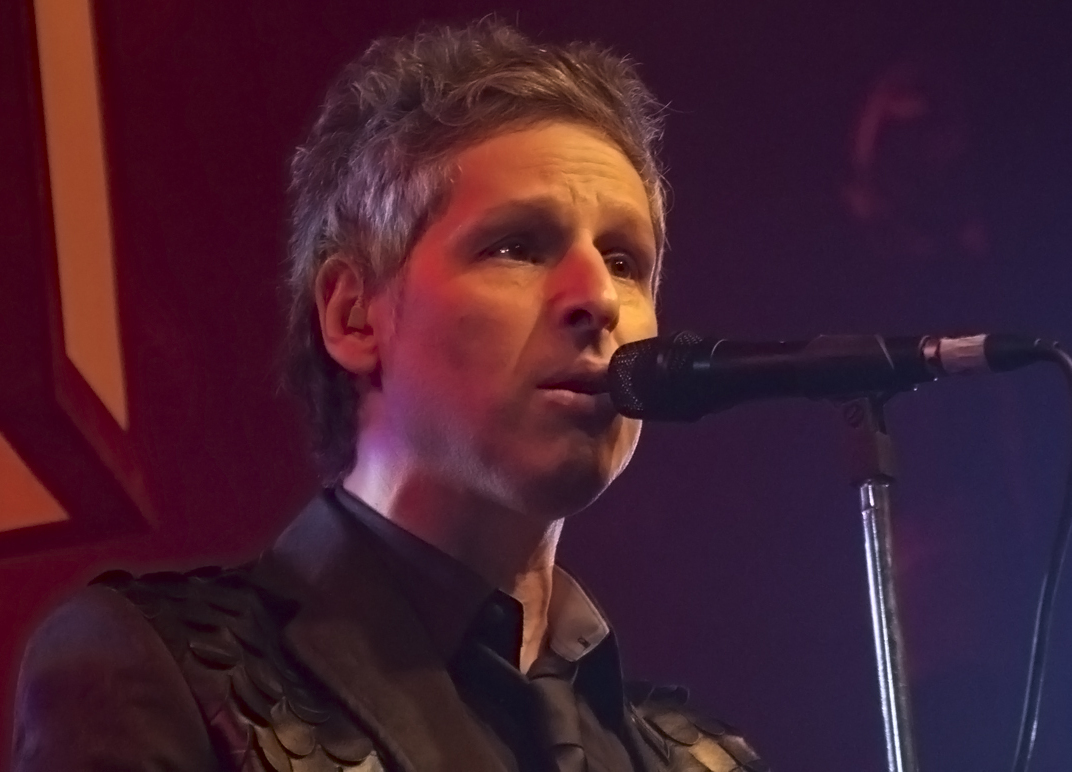
- Nei Van Soria in 2013

Background information
- Born: October 5, 1969 (age 56); Porto Alegre, Rio Grande do Sul, Brazil
- Genres: Rock, rockabilly, psychedelic rock, pop rock
- Occupations: Singer-songwriter, lyricist, pianist, guitarist, record producer
- Instruments: Vocals, electric guitar, piano
- Years active: 1985–present
- Labels: Antídoto, Paradoxx Music, Good Music Records
- Formerly of: TNT; Os Cascavelletes; Os Invertebrados
- Website: neivansoria.com

Nei Van Soria (born October 5, 1969) is a Brazilian singer-songwriter, lyricist, pianist, guitarist and record producer, famous for his work with pioneering Rio Grande do Sul rock bands TNT and Os Cascavelletes.

== Biography ==
Van Soria was born in Porto Alegre, Rio Grande do Sul on October 5, 1969. His first musical ventures were with rock band TNT, founded in 1984 by childhood friends Flávio Basso, Charles Master, Márcio Petracco, and Felipe Jotz. In 1985 TNT took part in the critically acclaimed compilation Rock Grande do Sul, released by RCA Records; however, Basso and Van Soria were unhappy with RCA, citing numerous creative divergences between them and the label, and so they left TNT to form their own project, Os Cascavelletes, in 1987.

Van Soria began his solo career shortly after Os Cascavelletes broke up, in 1992. He traveled to Buenos Aires, Argentina, where he began recording his debut album, Avalon, released in 1995 by Antídoto. In 1998 he released his second album, Jardim Inglês, through Paradoxx Music; it counted with a guest appearance by Nenhum de Nós vocalist Thedy Corrêa. The music video for the album's title track was shot in England.

In 2001 Van Soria founded his own record label, Good Music Records; its first release was the album Cidade Grande, in which he is accompanied by side project Os Invertebrados, composed of his former Os Cascavelletes bandmate Luciano Albo and Juliano Pereira. In 2003 he released his third solo album (and fourth release overall), O Dia + Feliz da Minha Vida.

2005 saw the release of Van Soria's first live album, Só, recorded two years prior at a gig at the Teatro Renascença in Porto Alegre. In 2007 he released the double-disc album Mundo Perfeito.

In 2009 Van Soria celebrated his 40th birthday with a show at the Bar Ocidente, accompanied by Flávio Basso; a DVD of the performance came out soon after. It was Van Soria's first video album.

In 2012 he released Um Cara Comum, which counted with guest appearances by Herbert Vianna, Charly García and Dado Villa-Lobos, and toured around Porto Alegre and Curitiba in a series of critically acclaimed shows to promote the album.

In 2015 he released his eighth album, RockLuv, which he described as "a traditional album without tricks or eclecticism".

On July 4, 2016, Van Soria teamed up with his former Os Cascavelletes friends Humberto Petinelli, Alexandre Barea and Frank Jorge to record "Balada para Flávio", a song in tribute to Flávio Basso, who died in December of the previous year.

His most recent release, Neblina, came out in 2017. The track "Homem de Pouca Fé" was released in advance on Van Soria's official YouTube channel on March 5. Later that year he released music videos for new songs "Telescópio" (which counted with a guest appearance by rock band Papas da Língua and was co-written by the band's vocalist Léo Hankin) and "Sol" (co-written by Armandinho).

== Personal life ==
Van Soria is married to designer Ângela Fayet, daughter of the architect Carlos Maximiliano Fayet, to whom Van Soria dedicated the album Mundo Perfeito. He has a son with Fayet, Théo (born 2002); a then-13-year-old Théo was a guest musician on his father's album RockLuv, playing guitar on the track "Muito Obrigado".

== Discography ==
=== With TNT ===
| Year | Album |
|---|---|
| 1985 | Rock Grande do Sul (compilation): Label: RCA Records; Format: Vinyl; Contributed with the songs "Entra Nessa" and "Estou na Mão" |

=== With Os Cascavelletes ===
For a more comprehensive list, see Os Cascavelletes#Discography

| Year | Album |
|---|---|
| 1989 | Rock'a'ula: Label: Odeon Records; Format: Vinyl |

=== Solo ===
==== Studio albums ====
| Year | Album |
|---|---|
| 1995 | Avalon: Label: Antídoto; Format: CD |
| 1998 | Jardim Inglês: Label: Paradoxx Music; Format: CD |
| 2003 | O Dia + Feliz da Minha Vida: Label: Good Music Records; Format: CD |
| 2007 | Mundo Perfeito: Label: Good Music Records; Format: CD |
| 2012 | Um Cara Comum: Label: Good Music Records; Format: CD |
| 2015 | RockLuv: Label: Good Music Records; Format: CD |
| 2017 | Neblina: Label: Good Music Records; Format: CD |

==== Live/video albums ====
| Year | Album |
|---|---|
| 2005 | Só: Label: Good Music Records; Format: CD |
| 2009 | Nei Van Soria: 40 Anos (Ao Vivo no Ocidente): Label: Good Music Records; Format: DVD |

=== With Os Invertebrados ===
| Year | Album |
|---|---|
| 2001 | Cidade Grande: Label: Good Music Records; Format: CD |
