= Plastic Soda =

Studio album by Jupiter Apple
- Released: September 1, 1999
- Genre: Progressive rock, psychedelic rock, space rock
- Length: 1:08:27
- Label: Trama
- Producer: Jupiter Apple

Jupiter Apple chronology
A Sétima Efervescência (1997)	Plastic Soda (1999)	Hisscivilization (2002)

Plastic Soda is the second studio album by the Brazilian musician Jupiter Apple, released on September 1, 1999, by the independent label Trama. Unlike its predecessor, it is sung entirely in English and blends elements of jazz and traditional Brazilian genres such as samba and bossa nova with the psychedelia Jupiter Apple is known for. Marcelo Birck, who previously collaborated with the musician in A Sétima Efervescência, returns for this release. Future Cachorro Grande guitarist Marcelo Gross also appears as a guest musician, providing drums.

The title of the track "Bridges of Redemption Park" references the Farroupilha Park (also known as Redemption Park) in Porto Alegre, Jupiter Apple's hometown.

== Track listing ==
All tracks are written by Jupiter Apple

No.	Title	Length
1.	"A Lad and a Maid in the Bloom"	9:19
2.	"Collectors Inside Collection"	4:38
3.	"Welcome to the Shade"	4:48
4.	"Plastic Soda"	4:44
5.	"The True Love of the Spider"	3:30
6.	"Over the Universe"	5:13
7.	"Wasn't It?" (instrumental)	10:50
8.	"Bridges of Redemption Park"	3:46
9.	"Morning Intuition Man"	6:34
10.	"Head-Head"	2:52
11.	"Please Don't Disturb"	4:23
12.	"24 Hours Nude"	5:14
13.	"Samby-Groovy Theme" (instrumental)	2:30

== Personnel ==
- Jupiter Apple – lead vocals, electric guitar, bass guitar, keyboards, percussion, production, cover art
- Marcelo Birck – electric guitar, arrangements (track 5)
- Julio Cascaes – bass guitar
- Marcelo Gross – drums
- Gustavo Dreher – flute
