= TNT II =

TNT

Studio album by TNT
- Released: 1988
- Genre: Rock and roll, rockabilly, hard rock, blues rock, pop rock, country rock, jazz rock
- Label: RCA Records
- Producer: Reinaldo B. Brito

TNT chronology
TNT (1987)	TNT (1988)	Noite Vem, Noite Vai (1991)

TNT, also referred to as TNT II, is the second self-titled studio album by the Brazilian rock band TNT, released in 1988 by RCA Records. Their last release with original drummer Felipe Jotz, it sees the band shifting away from their previous "juvenile" rockabilly sound towards a more "mature" direction influenced by pop rock, a trend which would culminate in their subsequent release, 1991's Noite Vem, Noite Vai. "A Irmã do Dr. Robert" was the album's greatest hit, and led TNT to play at the popular TV show Globo de Ouro in 1988.

The album's opening track, "Não Vai Mais Sorrir (Pra Mim)", counts with a guest appearance by famous musician Lulu Santos.

== Track listing ==
All tracks are written by Charles Master and Luís Henrique "Tchê" Gomes, except for "Muito Cuidado", "Não Sei", "Baby (Eu Vou Morar Noutro Planeta)" and "Dentro do Meu Carro" by Master, Gomes and Márcio Petracco

No.	Title	English title	Length
1.	"Não Vai Mais Sorrir (Pra Mim)" (feat. Lulu Santos)	She Won't Smile Again (For Me)	3:41
2.	"Muito Cuidado"	Very Careful	3:40
3.	"A Irmã do Dr. Robert"	Dr. Robert's Sister	3:55
4.	"Gata Maluca"	Crazy Cat	3:38
5.	"Ela Me Deu o Bolo"	She Made a Fool Out of Me	3:36
6.	"Charles Master"		3:36
7.	"Não Sei"	I Don't Know	3:54
8.	"Alazão"	Sorrel Horse	3:17
9.	"Baby (Eu Vou Morar Noutro Planeta)"	Baby (I'll Live in Another Planet)	3:43
10.	"Veja, Amor"	Look, Love	3:12
11.	"Dentro do Meu Carro"	Inside My Car	3:52
12.	"Tempo no Inferno"	Time in Hell	3:04

== Personnel ==
- Charles Master – vocals, bass guitar
- Márcio Petracco – electric guitar, pedal steel guitar, dobro, banjo
- Luís Henrique "Tchê" Gomes – electric guitar
- Felipe Jotz – drums
- Lulu Santos – additional vocals (track 1)
- Reinaldo B. Brito – production
- Miguel Plopschi – art direction
