= Hisscivilization =

Studio album by Jupiter Apple
- Released: 2002
- Studio: Dreher Studio
- Genre: Progressive rock; neo-psychedelia; space rock; synthedelia; neo-tropicália; post-rock
- Length: 1:17:49
- Label: Voiceprint Records
- Producer: Jupiter Apple; Thomas Dreher

Jupiter Apple chronology
Plastic Soda (1999)	Hisscivilization (2002)	Bitter (2007)

Professional ratings
Review scores
Source	Rating
AllMusic	link

Hisscivilization is the third studio album by the Brazilian musician Flávio Basso under the pseudonym Jupiter Apple, released in 2002 on Voiceprint Records. It has been retroactively praised as his most experimental, ambitious and elaborate output. It is also almost entirely sung in English, like his previous album Plastic Soda.

"Exactly" was re-recorded for his subsequent collaborative album with Bibmo, Bitter.

== Composition ==
On Hisscivilization, Basso was influenced by the early output of Pink Floyd and particularly Syd Barrett, the Canterbury scene—especially Soft Machine member Kevin Ayers and his 1970 album Shooting at the Moon—and Stereolab, the latter of whom maintained an influence on psychedelic indie acts in the turn of the millennium. It is characterized by the inclusion of electronic instrumentation, absent in Jupiter Apple's previous two releases, in a move that polarized critics and fans alike.

== Critical reception ==
The album was well-received upon its release, but many critics did not gravitate towards its heavily experimental sonority and long length. Writing for AllMusic, François Couture gave it 3 out of 5 stars, saying it is "filled with catchy hooks, intriguing twists and self-indulgent stretches", and comparing Jupiter Apple with Cornelius and Beck. However, he also said that "the album's only flaw is its duration—problem is, it's a big one. Not only does Hisscivilization clock in at 78 minutes, but most of its 13 tracks could have been substantially shortened". Matheus Donay of O Notório Abacaxi praised the album for its "Futuristic and Surrealist artfulness", but also criticized it for its length and stated that it requires "lots of patience" to listen to.

== Track listing ==
All tracks are written by Jupiter Apple.

No.	Title	Length
1.	"The Homeless and the Jet Boots Boy"	11:34
2.	"Pyrus malus et Fragaria vesca"	6:05
3.	"Act Not Surprised"	4:48
4.	"...So You Leave the Hall"	6:16
5.	"An Old Road/Aquarius and Pisces"	3:45
6.	"Overture and Something Else"	8:21
7.	"The Cat and the Rabbit" (instrumental)	2:55
8.	"In the Presence of Zohg Zucchini and Finale"	4:39
9.	"The Futuristica Waltz"	3:39
10.	"Exactly"	6:30
11.	"Metropole"	6:45
12.	"Tropical Permanent Holidays"	4:10
13.	"Civilization"	8:15

== Personnel ==
- Jupiter Apple – vocals, electric guitar, classical guitar, percussion, Moog, production, mixing
- Thomas Dreher – production, mixing, mastering
- Fernando Sanches – engineering
