= Bar Opinião =

Music venue in Porto Alegre, Brazil

- Music venue
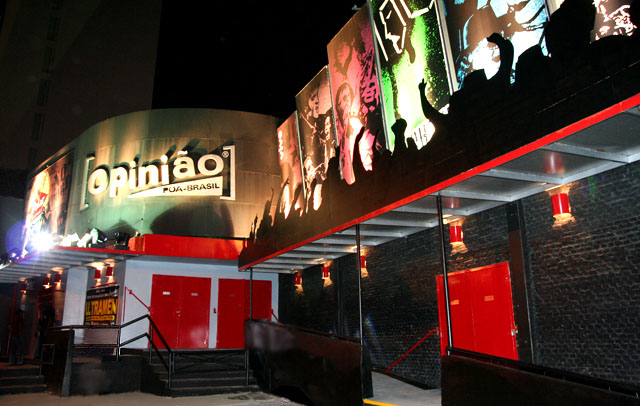
- Exterior view of venue (c.2008)
- Interactive map of Bar Opinião
- Address: Rua José do Patrocínio, 834; Porto Alegre; Brazil
- Location: Cidade Baixa
- Coordinates: 30.03639°S 51.23111°W
- Operator: Opinião Produtora
- Capacity: 2,000

Construction
- Opened: October 18, 1983
- Renovated: April 1995

Website
- opiniao.com.br/casas/bar-opiniao/

Bar Opinião is a music venue founded in 1983 in the city of Porto Alegre, Rio Grande do Sul, Brazil. Located in the Cidade Baixa neighborhood, it is considered one of the most traditional and active live music venues in southern Brazil. The venue hosts concerts by Brazilian and international artists, as well as private events, graduation parties, corporate functions and cultural activities. Since 1995, following a major renovation, the venue has had a maximum capacity of approximately 2,000 people.

Originally established on Joaquim Nabuco Street, the venue relocated in 1987 to its current address on José do Patrocínio Street. Throughout its history, Bar Opinião has played a significant role in Porto Alegre's music scene, particularly in the promotion of rock, pop, heavy metal, indie and alternative music, while also hosting performances from artists representing a wide variety of musical genres. In 1992, the creation of Opinião Produtora expanded the venue's role as a concert promoter, bringing larger national and international tours to the city.

== Noted performers ==
- Adriana Calcanhotto
- André Matos
- Anahí
- Angra
- Arlindo Cruz
- Arnaldo Antunes
- Asking Alexandria
- BaianaSystem
- Barão Vermelho
- Blind Guardian
- Bob Dylan
- Capital Inicial
- Carlos Villagrán
- Cat Power
- Charlie Brown Jr.
- Charly García
- Chelsea Grin
- Chico Science & Nação Zumbi
- Christian Chávez
- Christopher Uckermann
- Cidade Negra
- Creedence Clearwater Revival
- Dead Fish
- Deep Purple
- Diogo Nogueira
- Duda Beat
- Dulce María
- Echo & the Bunnymen
- Ed Motta
- Edguy
- Édgar Vivar
- Elza Soares
- Epica
- Fito Páez
- Gloria
- Helloween
- Ira!
- Jethro Tull
- Jorge Ben
- Judas Priest
- Júpiter Maçã
- Kamelot
- Kid Abelha
- Living Colour
- Lobão
- Luiz Melodia
- Maite Perroni
- Maná
- Maria Gadú
- Marina Sena
- Marky Ramone
- Mart'nália
- Mercedes Sosa
- Michael Hill's Blues Mob
- Mike Stern
- Motionless in White
- Motörhead
- Mr. Big
- MV Bill
- Mundo Livre S/A
- Nando Reis
- Nightwish
- O Rappa
- Os Paralamas do Sucesso
- Pato Fu
- Pedro Luís e a Parede
- Pitty
- Planet Hemp
- Plebe Rude
- Racionais MC's
- Raimundos
- Reação em Cadeia
- Renato Borghetti
- Roger Hodgson
- Sepultura
- Seu Jorge
- Skank
- Soldiers of Jah Army
- Steve Vai
- Stratovarius
- Sublime with Rome
- Suicidal Tendencies
- Sum 41
- Tarja Turunen
- The Skatalites
- The Toy Dolls
- Titãs
- Yes
- Zeca Baleiro
