= Jupiter Apple =

Brazilian musician (1968–2015)

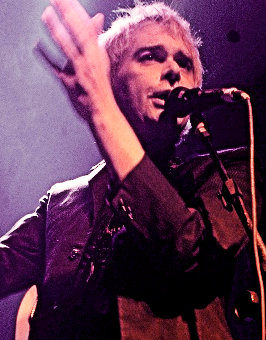
- Jupiter Apple in 2007
- Born: Flávio Basso; 26 January 1968; Porto Alegre, Rio Grande do Sul, Brazil
- Died: 21 December 2015 (aged 47); Porto Alegre, Rio Grande do Sul, Brazil
- Resting place: Cemitério Ecumênico João XXIII, Porto Alegre
- Other names: Júpiter Maçã; Woody Apple
- Occupations: Musician; songwriter; filmmaker
- Years active: 1984–2015
- Notable work: A Odisseia: Memórias e Devaneios de Jupiter Apple
- Musical career
- Genres: Experimental rock; rockabilly; blues rock; psychedelic rock; progressive rock; art rock; folk rock; rock and roll; synthrock; space rock
- Instruments: Vocals; guitar; bass; keyboards; percussion
- Labels: Antídoto; Trama; Voiceprint; Marquise 51; Elefant; Monstro Discos
- Formerly of: TNT; Os Cascavelletes; Os Pereiras Azuiz; Bibmo

Flávio Basso (26 January 1968 – 21 December 2015), better known by his stage name Júpiter Maçã and by its English-language variation Jupiter Apple, was a Brazilian singer, songwriter, multi-instrumentalist and filmmaker. Before beginning a solo career in 1994, he was already known for being a founding member of bands TNT and Os Cascavelletes, both pioneers of the Rio Grande do Sul rock scene in the mid-to-late 1980s/early 1990s.

== Biography ==
=== Early years, TNT and Os Cascavelletes ===
Flávio Basso was born in Porto Alegre, Rio Grande do Sul on 26 January 1968; his father was a physicist and his mother a teacher of German descent. He learned by himself to play the classical guitar when he was 13 years old, and cites Paul McCartney, Syd Barrett, John Lennon, Bob Dylan, Mick Jagger and Brian Jones as some of his influences. In 1984 he formed the rockabilly band TNT alongside his childhood friends Márcio Petracco, Felipe Jotz and Charles Master, being later joined by Nei Van Soria. TNT reached nationwide notoriety after their songs "Entra Nessa" and "Estou na Mão" were included in the 1985 compilation Rock Grande do Sul, made to promote rock bands from Rio Grande do Sul (such as Engenheiros do Hawaii, Os Replicantes, DeFalla and Garotos da Rua) and released by RCA Records. In 1986, one year before TNT released their first studio album, Van Soria and Basso left the band due to creative divergences with RCA to form their own project, Os Cascavelletes, which, despite its relatively short lifespan, managed to release one EP, one studio album and a demo. They self-described their irreverent style, characterized by comical and heavily sexually explicit lyrics, as "porno rock". The band's most famous composition was the 1989 hit "Nêga Bombom", featured in the soundtrack of the telenovela Top Model.

Os Cascavelletes broke up in 1992. In 1993, Basso re-joined TNT to record the single "Você Me Deixa Insano/Tá na Lona", but definitely left them again the following year after a falling-out with Charles Master.

=== Solo career ===
After his second departure from TNT, Basso began to perform solo, under the moniker "Woody Apple" (as an homage to musician Woody Guthrie and record label Apple Records, founded by The Beatles). It was not until 1995 when he adopted the stage name he became famous for, Júpiter Maçã (with "Júpiter" being an allusion to the fictional spaceship Jupiter 2, from one of his favorite TV series growing up, Lost in Space), and formed the very short-lived project Os Pereiras Azuiz alongside Ubirajara Guimarães, Rogério Campos and Luiz Wilfrido; they only released a demo tape, Orgasmo Legal, before disbanding. In 1997 he signed with independent label Antídoto to release his first solo full-length album, A Sétima Efervescência, which counted with guest appearances by his former Os Cascavelletes bandmates Frank Jorge and Alexandre Barea, and by Graforreia Xilarmônica guitarist Marcelo Birck; with a heavily psychedelic and experimental sonority comparable to Pink Floyd's 1967 debut The Piper at the Gates of Dawn, the album was critically acclaimed at the time of its release and in 2007 was ranked 96th at Rolling Stone Brasil's list of 100 Greatest Brazilian Music Records. Its follow-up from 1999, Plastic Soda, came out through Trama, and unlike its predecessor, it was fully sung in English; to reflect this, Basso signed the album as Jupiter Apple. It was characterised by an increase in the experimental elements already present in A Sétima Efervescência, mixing psychedelic rock with bossa nova and jazz. Even though it also had a good reception, critics considered it a very hard album to listen to. After the album's release, Basso temporarily moved to England, returning to Brazil in 2002.

Hisscivilization, his third album, was released soon afterwards by Voiceprint Records, and was his most ambitious and elaborate work; it is composed of 13 mostly instrumental tracks, the longest of which opens the album and is over 11 minutes long. Basso experimented more with electronic music elements in this album, what polarized critics and fans alike. In 2003 he moved to Europe once again – this time to Spain – alongside his then-domestic partner Bibiana "Bibmo" Morena to work on further material; after a 4-year hiatus, both returned to Brazil and he released alongside her the collaborative album Bitter through Monstro Discos. Through Elefant Records and in the same year he released his fourth (and ultimately last) album, Uma Tarde na Fruteira. It was re-issued in Brazil by Monstro Discos in 2008. In 2009, he released the non-album single "Modern Kid".

In 2006, six of Basso's songs – "Um Lugar do Caralho", "Querida Superhist x Mr. Frog", "Canção para Dormir", "The Freaking Alice (Hippie Under Groove)", "As Mesmas Coisas" and "A Marchinha Psicótica de Dr. Soup" – were included in the soundtrack of the animated film Wood & Stock: Sexo, Orégano e Rock'n'Roll, directed by Otto Guerra.

On 23 November 2011, Basso performed live at the Bar Opinião in Porto Alegre, accompanied by his newly founded supporting band, J.A.C.K. (an acronym for "Jupiter Apple Corporation and Kingdom"), at the time composed of Julio Sasquatt (drums), Julio Cascaes (electric guitar), Felipe Faraco (bass guitar) and Astronauta Pinguim (keyboards). A DVD of the performance, entitled Six Colours Frenesi, was released in 2014.

On 20 July 2012, he accidentally fell off the second floor of the building where he lived, and fractured one of his wrists and a vertebra. He was then admitted at the Hospital de Pronto Socorro de Porto Alegre, and eventually recovered after a successful surgery.

His final releases were the digital singles "Constantine's Empires" and "They're All Beatniks", which came out through Marquise 51 Records in 2015. The first one is available for listening at the record label's official SoundCloud page.

Alongside Tatá Aeroplano, he wrote and directed in 2001 the short film Apartment Jazz, which was broadcast for the first time by MTV in 2010. In 2011, he appeared in "Kreuko", a segment of the anthology film Mundo Invisível, alongside José Wilker and Sônia Braga. In 2015, he began work on a second short, Jane's Nightmare; a trailer was uploaded to YouTube on 15 July, but the film was left unfinished following Basso's death. He also hosted the short-lived talk show Júpiter Maçã Show on MTV.

Basso played his final show on 5 December 2015 at the Panamá Studio Pub, in Porto Alegre.

=== Personal life ===
Flávio had a son, Glenn Basso, who died on November 3, 2001, at the age of 11, from complications of autoimmune hepatitis.

=== Death and legacy ===
Known for his extravagant lifestyle, Basso struggled with alcoholism and drug abuse (he claimed he took Diazepam and used LSD and cocaine regularly) throughout most of his life, and was undergoing a treatment for cirrhosis on his later years. On 21 December 2015, he was found dead on the bathroom floor in his apartment; his cause of death was later revealed as being multiple organ failure. His wake was held at the Teatro Renascença in Porto Alegre, and he was buried the following day at the Cemitério Ecumênico João XXIII.

Commenting on his death, Basso's former Os Cascavelletes bandmate Frank Jorge said that he was a "tireless creator, a guy who broke away from all commonplaces and predictability". Musician and poet Rogério Skylab has once stated that Basso was one of his major influences, and besides interviewing him for his talk show Matador de Passarinho he has also covered his songs "Na Casa de Mamãe" (for Skygirls), "Eu e Minha Ex" (for Trilogia dos Carnavais: 25 Anos de Carreira ou de Lápide) and "A Marchinha Psicótica de Dr. Soup" (for Crítica da Faculdade do Cu). Former Os Replicantes vocalist Wander Wildner covered "Um Lugar do Caralho" for his 1996 solo debut Baladas Sangrentas. Rock band Ira! covered "Miss Lexotan 6mg Garota" for their 1998 album Você Não Sabe Quem Eu Sou.

Basso's semi-fictional autobiography, A Odisseia: Memórias e Devaneios de Jupiter Apple, co-written by Juli Manzi, was published posthumously by Azougue Editorial in 2016. Work on the book began in 2014; it was reissued in 2022 in a limited deluxe edition by Psico BR. Another biography of the musician, Júpiter Maçã: A Efervescente Vida e Obra, written by journalists Cristiano Bastos and Pedro Brandt, was published on 5 September 2018 by Plus Editora.

On 4 July 2016, Nei Van Soria released a song in tribute to Basso, entitled "Balada para Flávio". He originally wrote the song in November 2015, one month before Basso's death.

As of September 2017, a documentary about Basso, entitled O Garoto de Júpiter, is being made. Directed by Biah Werther and produced by Gabriel Flag, its production was being crowdfunded through website Catarse. The movie was still in production by 2020, when work on it was halted due to the COVID-19 pandemic.

On 29 January 2018, friends of the musician performed a special show in his honour at the Bar Ocidente in Porto Alegre, to celebrate what would have been his 50th birthday on 26 January.

In April 2018 a vinyl deluxe edition of Basso's debut album A Sétima Efervescência came out through Monstro Discos. Monstro Discos announced in November 2018 that a double-vinyl reissue of Uma Tarde na Fruteira was underway; it was released in January 2019.

On 11 March 2021, the posthumous album Apartment Jazz was released, originally intended to serve as the soundtrack of his eponymous film. Later in June, a long out-of-print extended play recorded in 2007 and entitled Ano XXI – № 4 – Incredible News!!!, was re-issued through streaming platforms. A second posthumous album containing nine tracks, The Man Was... Jupiter Apple, was released in May 2022. A compilation of demos and outtakes dated from the recording sessions of Uma Tarde na Fruteira, Sugar Doors – A Jupiter Apple 4-Track Experience, came out in February 2023 by Monstro Discos.

== Discography ==
=== With TNT ===
Year	Album
1985	Rock Grande do Sul (compilation): Label: RCA Records; Format: Vinyl; Contributed with the songs "Entra Nessa" and "Estou na Mão"

=== With Os Cascavelletes ===
For a more comprehensive list, see Os Cascavelletes#Discography

Year	Album
1989	Rock'a'ula: Label: Odeon Records; Format: Vinyl

=== With Os Pereiras Azuiz ===
Year	Album
1995	Orgasmo Legal (demo): Label: Self-released; Format: Cassette tape

=== Solo ===
==== Studio albums ====
Year	Album
1997	A Sétima Efervescência: Label: Antídoto; Format: CD, vinyl; Re-released in 2018 by Monstro Discos
1999	Plastic Soda: Label: Trama; Format: CD
2002	Hisscivilization: Label: Voiceprint Records; Format: CD
2007	Uma Tarde na Fruteira: Label: Elefant Records; Format: CD, vinyl; Re-released in 2008 and in 2019 by Monstro Discos
2021	Apartment Jazz: Label: Self-released; Format: Digital download; Originally recorded in 1999
2022	The Man Was... Jupiter Apple: Label: Self-released; Format: CD, vinyl
2023	Sugar Doors – A Jupiter Apple 4-Track Experience: Label: Monstro Discos; Format: CD, vinyl

==== Collaborative album ====
Year	Album
2007	Bitter: Label: Monstro Discos; Format: CD; Collaborative album with Bibiana "Bibmo" Morena

==== Video album ====
Year	Album
2014	Six Colours Frenesi: Label: J.A.C.K. Records; Format: DVD; Recorded in 2011

==== Singles ====
Year	Single	Album
2014	"Modern Kid"	Non-album song
2015	"Constantine's Empires"	Non-album song
2015	"They're All Beatniks"	Non-album song

== Filmography ==
- Apartment Jazz (2001; released in 2010)
- Mundo Invisível (2011; acted only)
- Jane's Nightmare (2015; unfinished)

== Bibliography ==
- A Odisseia: Memórias e Devaneios de Jupiter Apple (Azougue Editorial, 2016; co-written by Juli Manzi)
