= Graforreia Xilarmônica =

Brazilian rock group

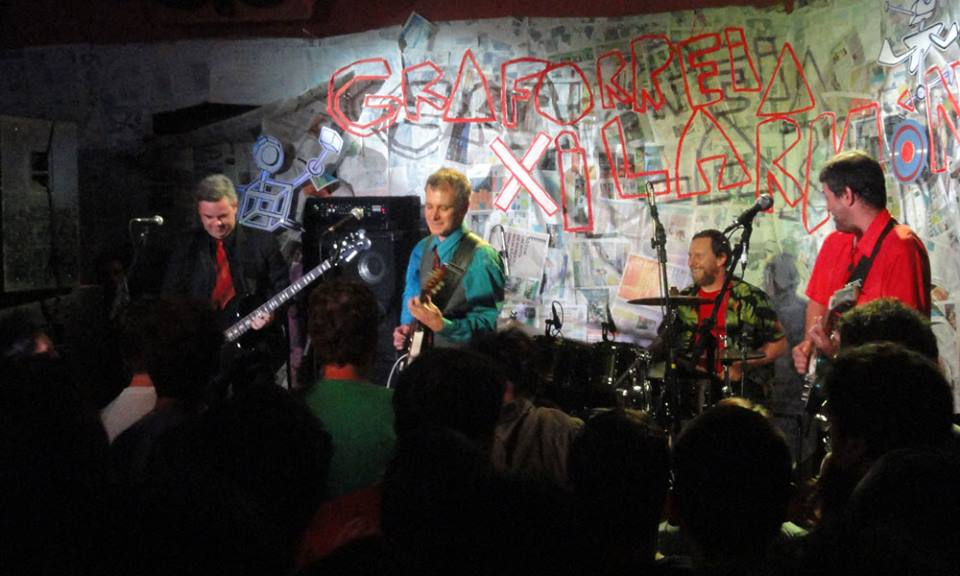
- The band in 2013. From left to right: Frank Jorge, Marcelo and Alexandre Birck, and Carlo Pianta

Background information
- Origin: Porto Alegre, Rio Grande do Sul, Brazil
- Genres: Rock, folk rock, comedy rock, pop rock, psychedelic rock
- Years active: 1987–2000; 2005–present
- Labels: Banguela Records, Zoon Records
- Members: Carlo Pianta; Alexandre Birck; Marcelo Birck; Frank Jorge

Graforreia Xilarmônica is a Brazilian Prêmio Açorianos-winning rock group from Porto Alegre, Rio Grande do Sul. Famous for their humorous, unpretentious lyrics and for their sonority influenced by 1960s-era bands, the Jovem Guarda movement and traditional gaúcho music, they amassed a strong cult following throughout the 1980s and 1990s which lasts to the present day.

== History ==
Graforreia Xilarmônica was founded in 1987 by Carlo Pianta, brothers Alexandre and Marcelo Birck, and Frank Jorge. All four had previous experiences with music: Pianta was a founding member of experimental rock group DeFalla, and the Birck brothers, alongside Jorge (who was also a founding member of Os Cascavelletes), played alongside future TNT guitarist Tchê Gomes in the short-lived project Prisão de Ventre during the early 1980s. (Only one year after the founding of Graforreia Xilarmônica, the Birck brothers had already founded a side project named Aristóteles de Ananias Jr.) According to the band members, their unusual name (very roughly translated to English as "Xylophone[-like] Graphorrhea) was chosen after looking for random words at a dictionary.

In 1988 they released the demo tape Com Amor, Muito Carinho, a massive underground hit which spawned some of their most memorable songs, such as "Empregada", "Amigo Punk", "Fúlvio Silas", "Dênis" and "Colégio Interno", which was included in the soundtrack of the film O Mentiroso, by Werner Schünemann. Years later they signed with Carlos Eduardo Miranda's Banguela Records to release their first full-length album, Coisa de Louco II, in 1995, which was critically acclaimed and quickly sold out. A follow-up, Chapinhas de Ouro, came out in 1998 through Zoon Records and awarded the band a Prêmio Açorianos for Best Album the following year. Soon the band members got occupied with more personal projects though, and Graforreia Xilarmônica split up in early January 2000.

In 2005 the band announced a reunion, and have been playing around Brazil since then. In 2006 they released their first live album, Graforreia Xilarmônica ao Vivo, produced by Alexandre Kassin and Berna Ceppas and released through webzine Senhor F. In 2011 they played at the Morrostock festival in Sapiranga, and celebrated their 25th anniversary in 2012 playing at the Lollapalooza in São Paulo. Later on they released through their Bandcamp page a special EP as a gift for their fans.

The band had their songs "Nunca Diga" and "Eu" covered by alternative rock band Pato Fu. Wander Wildner, formerly a vocalist of Os Replicantes, covered the songs "Empregada" and "Amigo Punk".

== Members ==
- Frank Jorge – lead vocals, bass guitar (1987–present)
- Carlo Pianta – electric guitar, additional vocals (1987–1989, 1992–present)
- Alexandre Birck – drums (1987–present)
- Marcelo Birck – electric guitar, additional vocals (1987–1990, 2001, 2011–2015)

=== Session musicians ===
- Tasso Ferreira – electric guitar (1987)
- Eduardo Christ – electric guitar, additional vocals (1996–2000)

== Discography ==
=== Studio albums ===
Year	Album
1995	Coisa de Louco II: Label: Banguela Records; Format: CD
1998	Chapinhas de Ouro: Label: Zoon Records; Format: CD

=== Extended plays ===
Year	Album
2012	Graforreia Xilarmônica: 25 Anos: Label: Self-released; Format: Digital download

=== Demos ===
Year	Album
1988	Com Amor, Muito Carinho: Label: Vórtex; Format: Cassette tape
1994	The Best of Graforreia Xilarmônica: Label: Self-released; Format: Cassette tape

=== Live albums ===
Year	Album
2006	Graforreia Xilarmônica ao Vivo: Label: Senhor F; Format: CD
