= Frank Jorge =

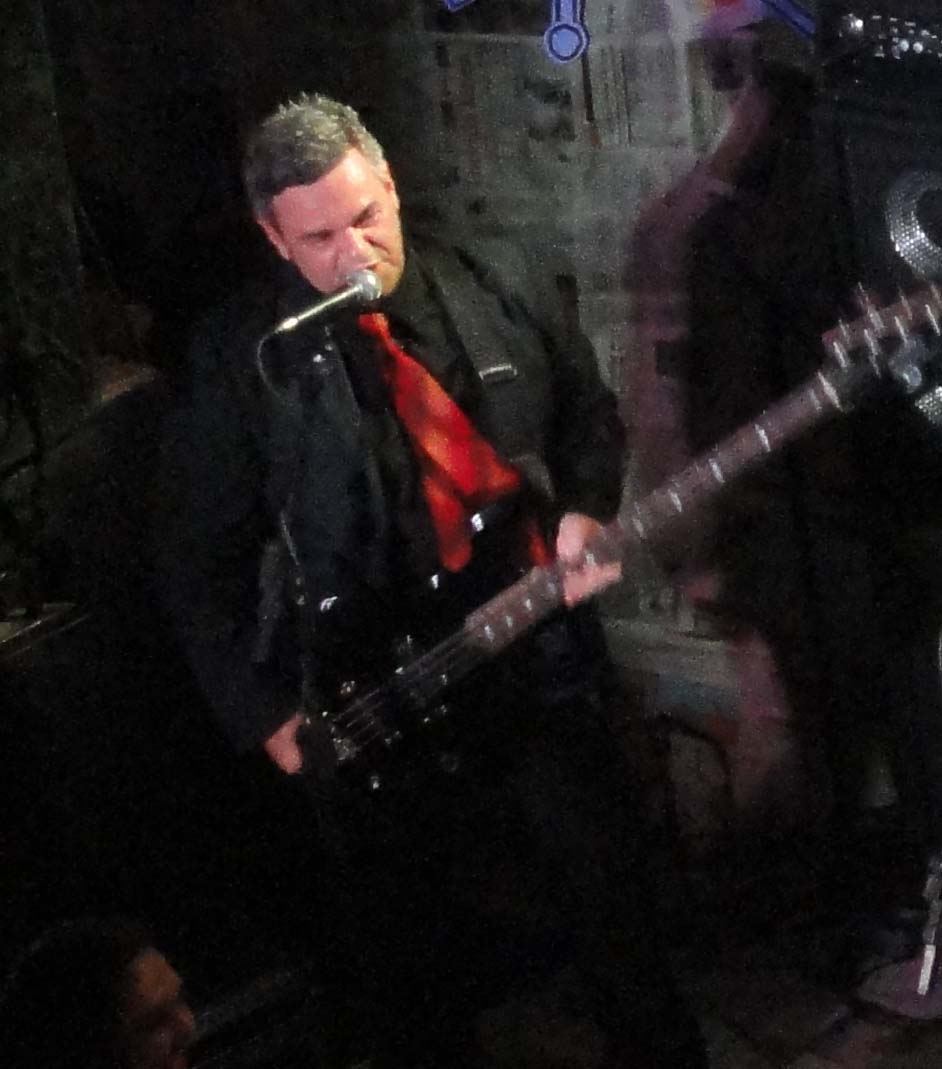
- Jorge performing with Graforreia Xilarmônica in 2013
- Born: Jorge Otávio Pinto Pouey de Oliveira; September 20, 1966 (age 60); Porto Alegre, Rio Grande do Sul, Brazil
- Education: Pontifical Catholic University of Rio Grande do Sul
- Occupations: Singer-songwriter, lyricist, guitarist, bassist, keyboardist, poet, chronicler, professor
- Years active: 1983–present
- Notable work: Realidades e Chantillys Diversos
- Musical career
- Genres: Rock, rock and roll, pop rock
- Instruments: Vocals, electric guitar, classical guitar, bass guitar, keyboards
- Labels: Barulhinho, YB Music, Monstro Discos, Selo 180

Jorge Otávio Pinto Pouey de Oliveira (born September 20, 1966), better known by his stage name Frank Jorge, is a Brazilian singer-songwriter, lyricist, multi-instrumentalist, poet, chronicler and professor, famous for his work with pioneering Rio Grande do Sul rock bands Os Cascavelletes and Graforreia Xilarmônica.

== Biography ==
Jorge was born in Porto Alegre, Rio Grande do Sul, on September 20, 1966. His father was a physician from Uruguaiana (who died when Jorge was only 2 years old), and his mother's family came from Santana do Livramento. He also has four sisters and a brother. During his travels abroad his father used to bring home many vinyl records, and his mother was very fond of literature, and on his later life Jorge would be very influenced by both aspects, to the point of graduating in Literature at the PUC-RS in 1992.

He learned how to play the classical guitar in mid-1981, and in 1983 formed his first band, Prisão de Ventre, alongside Luís "Tchê" Gomes (a future member of TNT) and brothers Alexandre and Marcelo Birck. They only recorded two songs before disbanding circa 1985. In 1987 Jorge reunited with the Birck brothers and, alongside Carlo Pianta, formed Graforreia Xilarmônica, which achieved a huge cult following in the mid-1990s with their humorous songs. Around the same time, invited by his childhood friend Alexandre Barea, Jorge was invited to join Os Cascavelletes as bassist; alongside vocalist Flávio Basso he wrote one of their most famous (and controversial) hits, "Menstruada". He left Os Cascavelletes in 1988, after the release of their debut EP, to focus solely on Graforreia Xilarmônica. After releasing two critically acclaimed albums, Coisa de Louco II (1995) and Chapinhas de Ouro (1998), they broke up in 2000. Graforreia Xilarmônica reunited in 2005, and Jorge continues to perform with them since then.

In 1997, alongside Júlio Reny and TNT guitarist Márcio Petracco, he formed the country rock group Cowboys Espirituais, but left them after the release of their first album to focus on more personal projects. He continued to collaborate occasionally with the group though, but didn't officially return to it until 2013.

In 2000 he released his first solo album, Carteira Nacional de Apaixonado, through label Barulhinho. It spawned one of his most memorable songs, "Cabelos Cor de Jambo", included in the soundtrack of Jorge Furtado's 2002 film Houve uma Vez Dois Verões. It was followed by three more albums, Vida de Verdade (2003), Volume 3 (2008) and Escorrega Mil Vai Três Sobra Sete (2016). On December 11, 2017, Jorge released the digital single "Vida na Cidade (Allegro ma non-tanto)", compared favorably by a critic to Chuck Berry's "Roll Over Beethoven" and the songs of Paul McCartney. On April 27, 2018, Jorge released another single, "S.O.S. Maloca", as a teaser to his most recent album, Histórias Excêntricas ou Algum Tipo de Urgência, released on June 1, 2018.

From 2008 to 2010 he was a member of the supergroup Tenente Cascavel, a tribute act to TNT and his former project Os Cascavelletes. In 2018 he returned to the band.

On October 13, 2017, alongside also former Os Cascavelletes member Luciano Albo, Jorge opened a Paul McCartney show in Porto Alegre.

Outside music, Jorge is also known for lecturing about rock music at Unisinos since 2006, and for hosting the radio show Sarau Elétrico on Ipanema FM from the late 1990s until the mid-2000s. He also authored three anthologies of poems and chronicles: Realidades e Chantillys Diversos (2000), Crocâncias Inéditas (2001) and Vida de Verdade (2002; not to be confused with his eponymous album).

== Discography ==
=== With Os Cascavelletes ===
Year	Album
1987	Vórtex Demo (demo): Label: Self-released; Format: Cassette tape
1988	Os Cascavelletes (EP): Label: Self-released; Format: Vinyl
1988	Rio Grande do Rock (compilation): Label: SBK Records; Format: Vinyl; Contributed with the songs "Morte por Tesão" and "Estou Amando uma Mulher"

=== With Graforreia Xilarmônica ===
For a more comprehensive list, see Graforreia Xilarmônica#Discography

Year	Album
1995	Coisa de Louco II: Label: Banguela Records; Format: CD
1998	Chapinhas de Ouro: Label: Zoon Records; Format: CD

=== With Cowboys Espirituais ===
Year	Album
1998	Cowboys Espirituais: Label: Trama; Format: CD

=== Solo ===
Year	Album
2000	Carteira Nacional de Apaixonado: Label: Barulhinho; Format: CD
2003	Vida de Verdade: Label: YB Music; Format: CD
2008	Volume 3: Label: Monstro Discos; Format: CD
2016	Escorrega Mil Vai Três Sobra Sete: Label: Selo 180; Format: CD
2018	Histórias Excêntricas ou Algum Tipo de Urgência: Label: Selo 180; Format: CD

== Bibliography ==
- Realidades e Chantillys Diversos (Artes e Ofícios, 2000)
- Crocâncias Inéditas (Sagra Luzzatto, 2001)
- Vida de Verdade (Sagra Luzzatto, 2002)
