= Os Cascavelletes =

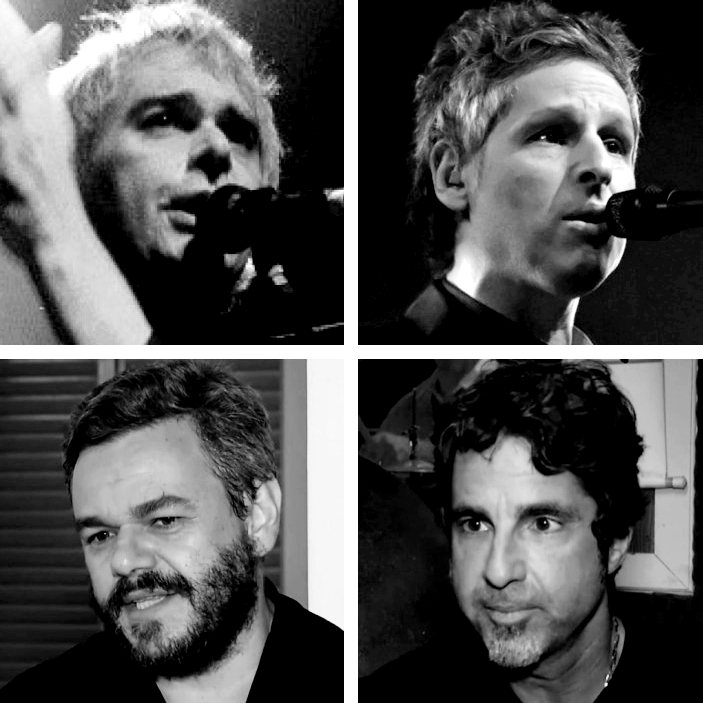
- The band's original members; clockwise from top left: Flávio Basso, Nei Van Soria, Alexandre Barea and Frank Jorge.

Background information
- Origin: Porto Alegre, Rio Grande do Sul, Brazil
- Genres: Rock, rockabilly, blues rock, rock and roll, psychedelic rock, folk rock
- Years active: 1986–1991; 2007
- Label: Odeon Records
- Spinoffs: Tenente Cascavel
- Past members: Flávio Basso; Nei Van Soria; Frank Jorge; Luciano Albo; Alexandre Barea; Humberto Petinelli

Os Cascavelletes were a Brazilian rock group from Porto Alegre, Rio Grande do Sul. One of the first rock bands from Rio Grande do Sul to acquire mainstream success nationwide alongside its "sister project" TNT, they were characterized by their irreverent style inspired by 1950s-era rockabilly culture and acts such as The Rolling Stones and The Beatles, and by their comical, profanity- and sex-laden lyrics (in a musical style self-described as "porno rock"). Some of their most famous compositions are "Sob um Céu de Blues", "Menstruada", "Estou Amando uma Mulher", "Eu Quis Comer Você" and the 1989 hit "Nêga Bombom".

According to founding members Flávio Basso and Nei Van Soria, the band's name is a portmanteau of the words "cascavel" ("rattlesnake" in Portuguese) and "Marvelettes", in a reference to the eponymous American girl group popular in the mid-1960s.

== History ==
In 1986, Flávio Basso and Nei Van Soria parted ways with their former project TNT, citing creative divergences with their label RCA. They formed Os Cascavelletes the same year after being joined by Frank Jorge and Alexandre Barea (a future founding member of heavy metal group Rosa Tattooada). In the following year, they recorded a nameless demo tape (popularly known as Vórtex Demo because of the studio in which it was recorded) that gave them notoriety in the underground scene.

In 1988, the band released a 6-track self-titled EP; three of the tracks were re-recorded from the demo, while the remaining were previously unreleased. The track "Estou Amando uma Mulher" became a major hit after airplay in radio stations of the time and its inclusion in SBK Records' compilation Rio Grande do Rock. Frank Jorge left the band soon after the EP's release to focus on another project of his, Graforreia Xilarmônica, of which he was one of its founding members.

Jorge was replaced by Luciano Albo and Humberto Petinelli joined them as keyboardist for their debut full-length album, Rock'a'ula, released by Odeon Records in 1989. Produced by former Barão Vermelho bassist Dé Palmeira, it was responsible for catapulting the band into nationwide fame. The album spawned the hit single "Nêga Bombom", which was included in the soundtrack of the telenovela Top Model, broadcast by Rede Globo from 1989 to 1990.

The band's final release before their break-up in 1991 was the 7" single "Homossexual/Sob um Céu de Blues". All the members of Os Cascavelletes began successful solo careers, particularly Flávio Basso, who after a brief reunion with TNT began to perform as Júpiter Maçã (later Jupiter Apple) and released his critically acclaimed debut, A Sétima Efervescência, in 1997.

The band's classic line-up reunited for a one-time performance in 2007 to celebrate the 10th anniversary of now-defunct radio station Pop Rock FM. The following year, former members of Os Cascavelletes and TNT formed the supergroup Tenente Cascavel, to celebrate the legacy of both bands.

Former vocalist Flávio Basso died on December 21, 2015, at the age of 47.

== Band members ==
=== Last line-up ===
- Flávio Basso – vocals, electric guitar (1986–1991, 2007; died 2015)
- Nei Van Soria – vocals, electric guitar (1986–1991, 2007)
- Frank Jorge – bass guitar (1986–1989, 2007)
- Alexandre Barea – drums (1986–1991, 2007)

=== Former members ===
- Luciano Albo – bass guitar (1989–1991)
- Humberto Petinelli – keyboards (1989–1991)

== Discography ==
=== Studio albums ===
Year	Album	Information
1987	Vórtex Demo: Label: Self-released; Format: Cassette tape	Demo
1988	Os Cascavelletes: Label: Self-released; Format: Vinyl	Extended play
1988	Rio Grande do Rock: Label: SBK Records; Format: Vinyl; Contributed with the songs "Morte por Tesão" and "Estou Amando uma Mulher"	Compilation
1989	Rock'a'ula: Label: Odeon Records; Format: Vinyl	Studio album

=== Singles ===
Year	Single	Album
1989	"Nêga Bombom"	Rock'a'ula
1991	"Homossexual/Sob um Céu de Blues"	Non-album song
