= TNT (Brazilian band) =

Brazilian rock band

- Origin: Porto Alegre, Brazil
- Genres: Pop rock, country rock
- Years active: 1984 - 1994; 2003 - 2007
- Labels: RCA, Orbeat
- Past members: See below

TNT was a Brazilian rock group from Porto Alegre, Rio Grande do Sul. One of the first rock bands from Rio Grande do Sul to acquire mainstream success nationwide alongside its "sister project" Os Cascavelletes, they are known for hits such as "Entra Nessa", "Estou na Mão", "Ana Banana", "Cachorro Louco" and "A Irmã do Dr. Robert".

== History ==
TNT was formed in Porto Alegre in 1984, by childhood friends Flávio Basso, Charles Master, Felipe Jotz and Marcio Petracco. Petracco, however, left them soon after and was replaced by Nei Van Soria. They came to public knowledge in 1985, after taking part in RCA Records' compilation Rock Grande do Sul, made to promote rock bands from Rio Grande do Sul such as Engenheiros do Hawaii, Os Replicantes, DeFalla and Garotos da Rua. One year after the compilation's release, citing creative divergences with RCA, Basso and Van Soria left TNT to form their own project, Os Cascavelletes.

In 1987 Petracco returned to the band, and alongside new guitarist Luís Felipe "Tchê" Gomes, they released their self-titled debut studio album, TNT. With many of its tracks written by Master and Basso prior to his departure, it was a critical and commercial success, being responsible for catapulting the band into nationwide fame. A second self-titled album came out the next year, which counted with a guest appearance by Lulu Santos; drummer Felipe Jotz left the band after its release, and was replaced by Paulo Arcari.

In 1991 the band's third album, Noite Vem, Noite Vai, was released; it marked a shift from their previous rockabilly-/rock and roll-inflected sonority towards a more traditional pop rock one. Keyboardist João Maldonado had joined them by then. Tchê Gomes left the band after the album's release, following squabbles with Charles Master.

After Basso's project Os Cascavelletes split up in 1992, he returned as vocalist to TNT the following year. He recorded the single "Você Me Deixa Insano/Tá na Lona". However, he left them again in 1994 after a series of creative divergences with Charles Master, which made them split up soon afterward. Basso later began a successful solo career under the moniker Júpiter Maçã (later Jupiter Apple). Márcio Petracco, alongside Júlio Reny and Graforreia Xilarmônica bassist Frank Jorge, formed the country rock group Cowboys Espirituais in 1997.

In 2003 the band reunited as Master, Petracco, Gomes and new drummer Fábio Ly, from Bandaliera. After a series of tours and the release of a live album in 2004, Petracco left TNT once more. Now as a trio, the band released their fourth and final studio album, Um por Todos ou Todos por Um, in 2005, which was nominated for a Prêmio Açorianos later that year. They split up definitely two years later, in 2007.

In 2008, former members of TNT and Os Cascavelletes united to form the supergroup Tenente Cascavel, a tribute act to both bands.

Former vocalist Flávio Basso died on 21 December 2015, at the age of 47.

== Band members ==
=== Current line-up ===
- Charles Master – lead vocals, bass (1984–1994; 2003–2007; 2024–present)
- Márcio Petracco – guitars, backing vocals (1984–1985; 1987–1994; 2003–2005; 2024–present)
- Luís Henrique "Tchê" Gomes – guitars, backing vocals (1987–1991; 2003–2007; 2024–present)
- Paulo Arcari – drums (1988–1994; 2024–present)
- Fábio Ly – drums (2003–2007; 2024–present)
- João Maldonado – keyboards (1991–1994; 2024–present)

=== Former members ===
- Flávio Basso – lead vocals (1984–1986; 1993–1994; died 2015)
- Nei Van Soria – guitars, backing vocals (1985–1986)
- Felipe Jotz – drums (1984–1988)

Timeline

== Discography ==
=== Studio albums ===
- (1987) TNT I
- (1988) TNT II
- (1991) Noite Vem, Noite Vai
- (2005) Um por Todos ou Todos por Um

=== Live albums ===
- (2004) TNT ao Vivo
