= Estação Brasil =

Compilation album by Zé Ramalho
- Released: 2003
- Genre: MPB
- Length: 83:29
- Label: BMG
- Producer: Robertinho de Recife

Zé Ramalho chronology
O Gosto da Criação (2002)	Estação Brasil (2003)	Zé Ramalho ao vivo (2005)

Estação Brasil is a compilation album by Brazilian solo artist Zé Ramalho, containing songs by him (including one new song, "Nesse Brasil cabôco de Mãe-Preta e Pai João") as well as songs by various Brazilian artists. It was released in 2003.

== Track listing ==
The following track lists are available:

No.	Title	Music	Length
1.	"Nesse Brasil cabôco de Mãe-Preta e Pai João" (In This caboclo Brazil of Black-Mother and Father João)	Zé Ramalho	3:37
2.	"Águas de março" (March Waters)	Antonio Carlos Jobim	4:18
3.	"O trenzinho do caipira (Bachianas brasileiras nº 2)" (The Little Train of the Caipira (Bachianas brasileiras nº 2))	Heitor Villa-Lobos, Ferreira Gullar	4:15
4.	"Caçador de mim" (Hunter of Me)	Luiz Carlos Sá, Sérgio Magrão	4:21
5.	"O que é o que é" (What is it what is it)	Gonzaguinha	5:14
6.	"Desejo de mouro" (Moor's Desire)	Zé Ramalho	3:17
7.	"Meu bem querer" (My to want it bad)	Djavan	3:37
8.	"Não quero dinheiro (só quero amar)" (I Don't Want Money (I Just Want to Love))	Tim Maia	4:02
9.	"Cantiga do sapo" (Frog's Cantiga)	Buco do Pandeiro, Jackson do Pandeiro	4:07
10.	"Dança das luzes" (Dance of The Lights)	Zé Ramalho	3:07
11.	"Hino amizade" (Friendship Anthem)	Zé Ramalho	4:40
12.	"Planeta Água" (Water Planet)	Guilherme Arantes	4:04
13.	"Tempos modernos" (Modern Times)	Lulu Santos	5:36
14.	"Romaria"	Renato Teixeira	4:03
15.	"Asa Branca" (White Wing)	Luiz Gonzaga, Humberto Teixeira	4:21
16.	"Kamikaze"	Zé Ramalho	4:29
17.	"Bete Balanço" (Bete Shake)	Roberto Frejat, Cazuza	4:16
18.	"Mesmo que seja eu" (Even If It's Me)	Erasmo Carlos, Roberto Carlos	3:23
19.	"Malandragem dá um tempo" (Malandragem, give a break)	Popular P., Adelzonilton, Moacyr Bombeiro	4:15
20.	"Mote das amplidões" (Amplidões' Motto)	Zé Ramalho	4:27

== Personnel ==
- Zé Ramalho – Acoustic guitar on tracks 1, 4, 5, 6, 7, 8, 9, 10, 11, 12, 13, 15, 16, 17, 20, lead vocals on tracks 1, 5, 6, 7, 8, 9, 10, 11, 12, 13, 14, 15, 16, 17, 19, 20, Arrangement on tracks 2, 8, 13, 14, 17, 18, 19, electric guitar on tracks 2, 18, electric guitar solo on track 4
- Robertinho de Recife – Viola on track 1, twelve-string viola on track 2, arrangement on tracks 2, 4, 5, 6, 7, 9, 15, 16, 19, 20, electric guitar on tracks 4, 8, 9, 16, twelve-string guitar on track 14, bass guitar on track 18, 19, acoustic guitar on track 19, cavaco on track 19, sitar on track 20
- João Lyra – Acoustic guitar on tracks 3, 5, 14, 15 arrangement on track 14
- Rick Ferreira – Electric guitar on track 10, steel guitar on tracks 11, 13
- André Neiva – Bass guitar on tracks 1, 2, 3, 6, 13, 15, 16, 20
- Jamil Joanes – Bass on tracks 8, 14
- Eduardo Krieger – Seven-string bass guitar on track 19
- Luiz Antônio – Arrangement on tracks 1, 12, keyboard on tracks 1, 2, 6, 12, 13, 15, 16, 20
- Dodô de Moraes – Arrangement on track 10, keyboard on track 10
- Jota Moraes – Arrangement on track 14, keyboard on track 14
- Sandro Moreno – Drums on track 10, 11
- João Firmino – Percussion on tracks 3, 6, 7, 15, 16, 20
- Marcos Suzano – Percussion on track 13
- Durval – Zabumba on tracks 2, 8, percussion on track 18
- Zé Gomes – Pandeiro on tracks 2, 8, percussion on track 18
- Naif Simões – Drums on track 2, percussion on tracks 9, 17, 19
- Léo Ortiz – Violin on tracks 1, 6, 15, 20
- Marcio Malard – Cello on track 3
- Lui Coimbra – Cello on track 5
- Andréa Ernest – Flute on track 3
- Cristiano Alves – Clarinet on track 3
- Juarez Araújo – Clarinet on track 19
- Carlos Prazeres – Oboe on track 3
- Carlos Malta – Fife on track 9
- Ismael Oliveira – Horn on track 3
- Toti Cavalcanti – Saxophone on track 10, flute on track 14
- Dominguinhos – Accordion on tracks 2, 7
- Aldrin de Caruaru – Accordion on tracks 4, 17
- Waldonys – Accordion on tracks 8, 19
- Chico Guedes – Choir on tracks 1, 12, 19, bass guitar on tracks 10, 11
- Aldrin de Caruaru – Choir on tracks 1, 12, 19, accordion on tracks 8, 18
- Gilberto Teixeira – Choir on tracks 1, 12, 19
- Boca – Choir on tracks 1, 12, 19
- Roberta de Recife – Choir on tracks 5, 8, bass guitar on track 17
- Jussara Sara – Choir on tracks 5, 8
- Carla Pietro – Choir on tracks 5, 8
- Micheline Linhares – Choir on tracks 5, 8
- Hana – Children choir on track 9
- Carlos Roberto – Children choir on track 9
- Carolina – Children choir on track 9
- Isadora – Children choir on track 9
- Sean – Children choir on track 9
- Ingrid – Children choir on track 9
- Eduardo Souto Neto – Arrangement on track 3
