= Nação Nordestina =

Studio album by Zé Ramalho
- Released: 2000
- Genre: MPB
- Length: 81:18
- Label: BMG
- Producer: Robertinho de Recife

Zé Ramalho chronology
Eu Sou Todos Nós (1998)	Nação Nordestina (2000)	Zé Ramalho canta Raul Seixas (2001)

Professional ratings
Review scores
Source	Rating
allmusic	4.5/5 stars

Nação Nordestina is the fifteenth studio album and first double album by Brazilian solo artist Zé Ramalho. It was released in 2000. The cover art of the album is clearly based on The Beatles' Sgt. Pepper's Lonely Hearts Club Band. It is a concept album which tells the history of a traveller exploring the Northeastern Brazil.

== Track listing ==
No.	Title	Music	Length
1.	"Intróito à nação" (Introduction to the Nation)	Zé Ramalho	2:46
2.	"O meu país" (My Country)	Livardo Alves, Orlando Tejo, Gilvan Chaves	4:58
3.	"Pra não dizer que não falei das flores" (Not To Say That I didn't Talk About The Flowers)	Geraldo Vandré	4:44
4.	"Lamento sertanejo" (Sertanejo Regret)	Gilberto Gil, Dominguinhos	4:01
5.	"Temporal" (Storm)	Bráulio Tavares, Fuba	4:07
6.	"Seres alados" (Winged Beings)	Zé Ramalho	4:39
7.	"Beijo morte beijo" (Kiss Death Kiss)	Pedro Osmar, Jaiel de Assis	4:23
8.	"Meninos do sertão" (Boys from the Sertão)	Petrúcio Amorim, Maciel Melo	5:10
9.	"Ele disse" (He Said; Includes portions of a Getúlio Vargas' speech on December 1, 1951, at the Clube de Regatas Vasco da Gama)	Edgar Ferreira	3:12
10.	"Mourão voltado em questões" (Mourão Turned in Questions)	Zé Ramalho	4:10
11.	"Violando com Hermeto" (Violando with Hermeto "Violando" is the present continuous form of the verb "Violar", which means lit. To acoustic guitar, but should be understood as "To play the acoustic guitar".)	Zé Ramalho	3:24
12.	"Hino nordestino" (Northeastern Anthem)	Guio de Moraes	3:34
13.	"Bandeira desfraldada" (Unfurled Flag)	Vital Farias	4:51
14.	"Pau-de-arara"	Luiz Gonzaga, Guio de Moraes	2:43
15.	"Amar quem eu já amei" (To Love Who I've Already Loved)	João do Vale, Libório	2:48
16.	"Garrote ferido" (Wounded Tourniquet)	Zé Ramalho	4:13
17.	"Paraí-ba"	Guio de Moraes	3:54
18.	"Eu vou pra lua" (I'm Going To The Moon)	Luiz Boquinha, Ary Lobo	2:58
19.	"Estes discos voadores me preocupam demais" (These Flying Saucers Make Me Too Upset)	Oliveira de Panelas	6:47
20.	"Digitado em poesia" (typographed in Poetry)	Zé Ramalho	3:56

== Personnel ==
- Zé Ramalho – Arrangement on tracks 1, 2, 4, 5, 6, 7, 8, 9, 10, 14, 15, 16, 17, 20 viola on tracks 1, 2, 4, 5, 6, 7, 8, 9, 10, 11, 12, 13, 14, 15, 16, 17, 20 lead vocals on all tracks except for 11, acoustic guitar on track 3, ponteios on track 11
- Elba Ramalho – Lead vocals on track 13
- Ivete Sangalo – Lead vocals on track 15
- Fagner – Lead vocals on track 16
- Flávio José – Lead vocals on track 17
- Cascabulho – Lead vocals on track 18
- Silvério Pessoa – Lead vocals on track 18
- Naná Vasconcelos – Lead vocals on track 1, calabash on track 11, percussion on track 12
- Rick Ferreira – Electric guitar on track 8
- Pepeu Gomes – electric guitar on track 16
- Chico Guedes – Bass guitar on tracks 4, 8, 17
- Artur Maia – Bass guitar on tracks 6, 9, 10, 15
- Jamil Joanes – Bass guitar on track 16, 20
- Cláudio Ribeiro – Bass guitar on track 18
- Mingo Araújo – Percussion on track 4, 16
- João Firmino – Percussion on track 5, 6, 7, 8, 10, 13, triangle on track 11
- Zé Gomes – Percussion on tracks 9, 14, 15, 17, 20 pandeiro on track 11
- Zé Leal – Percussion on tracks 9, 14, 15, 17, 20
- Duane – Percussion on tracks 9, 14, 15, 17, 20 zabumba on track 11
- Kleber Magrão – Triangle on track 18
- Marcos Lopes – Agogô on track 18
- Wilson Farias – Pandeiro and ilú on track 18
- Jorge Martins – Zabumba and ilú on track 18
- César Micheles – Flute on tracks 9, 13, saxophone on track 13, fifes on track 17
- Zé da Flauta – Flute on track 18
- Marcos Moleta – Rebec on track 10
- Hermeto Pascoal – Melodica on track 11
- Lito Viana – Cavaquinho on track 18
- Dominguinhos – Accordion on tracks 4, 8, 14
- Waldonys – Accordion on tracks 5, 7, 12, 15, 16, 20
- Silveirinha – Accordion on track 18, choir on track 10
- Luiz Antônio – Arrangement on tracks 1, 8, 19 keyboard on tracks 1, 6, 19, bass guitar on tracks 12, 14
- Dodô de Moraes – Arrangement on track 1
- Robertinho de Recife – Arrangement on tracks 3, 12, 13, 16, sampler on track 3, electric guitar on tracks 4, 5, 6, 8, 20 vocalise on track 7, charango on track 7, sitar on track 13, on berimbau on track 10, cavaquinho on track 14
- Armandinho – Baiana electric guitar on track 15
- Léo Ortiz – Violin on track 13
- Glauco Fernandes – Violin on track 13
- Luiz Fernando Zamith – Cello on track 13
- Nayran Pessanha – Viola on track 13
- Dênis Ferreira – Choir on track 10
- Eduardo Krieger – Choir on track 10
- Fábio Luna – Choir on track 10
- Fabrício Signorelli – Choir on track 10
- Lucas Amorim – Choir on track 10
- Roberta de Recife – Choir on track 10
- Adriana B.B. – Choir on track 10
