= Antologia Acústica =

Compilation album by Zé Ramalho
- Released: 1997
- Recorded: February 1997
- Genre: MPB
- Length: 84:36
- Label: BMG
- Producer: Robertinho de Recife

Zé Ramalho chronology
| Cidades e Lendas (1996) | Antologia Acústica (1997) | Eu Sou Todos Nós (1998) |

Professional ratings
Review scores
| Source | Rating |
|---|---|
| allmusic | 4/5 stars |

Antologia Acústica is an acoustic compilation album by Brazilian solo artist Zé Ramalho. It was released in 1997, same year in which he released a 3-CD box set to celebrate 20 years of career. It went double-platinum and triple-platinum in 2005, with more than 750.000 copies sold.

== Track listing ==
=== Disc 1 ===
1. "Avôhai" - 5:14
2. "Chão de Giz" - 4:31
3. "Beira-Mar" - 4:19
4. "Vila do Sossego" - 3:30
5. "Canção Agalopada" - 4:14
6. "A Terceira Lâmina" - 3:51
7. "Eternas Ondas" - 3:58
8. "Garoto de Aluguel" (Taxi Boy) - 5:12
9. "Táxi-Lunar" - 3:56 (Zé Ramalho, Geraldo Azevedo, Alceu Valença)
10. "Kryptônia" - 4:56

=== Disc 2 ===
1. "Frevo Mulher" - 4:38
2. "Banquete de Signos" - 3:42
3. "Força Verde" - 3:26
4. "Admirável Gado Novo" - 5:04
5. "Galope Rasante" - 3:57
6. "Bicho de 7 Cabeças" - 4:21 (Zé Ramalho, Geraldo Azevedo)
7. "Mulher Nova, Bonita e Carinhosa Faz o Homem Gemer Sem Sentir Dor" - 3:52 (Zé Ramalho, Otacílio Batista)
8. "Pepitas de Fogo" - 3:10
9. "Jardim das Acácias" - 4:57
10. "Batendo na Porta do Céu" (Knockin' on Heaven's Door) - 3:48 (Bob Dylan, version by Zé Ramalho)

All music by Zé Ramalho, except otherwise noted

== Personnel ==
- Zé Ramalho - Acoustic guitar, lead vocals
- Geraldo Azevedo - Acoustic guitar on track 9
- Roberto Frejat - Acoustic guitar on track 2, 7
- Arthur Maia - Bass guitar on tracks 1, 3, 5, 12, 14, 15, 18, 19
- Chico Guedes - Bass guitar on track 5, 6, 7, 8, 9, 10, 13, 17, 20
- Robertinho de Recife - Arrangement on tracks 1, 7, 8, 10, 11, 13, 14, 19, 20 sitar on track 1, 11, twelve-string guitar on track 4, 10, viola on track 5, 9, 12, 17, twelve-string viola on track 13, 20, viola dobra on track 14, portuguese guitar on track 6, 18, acoustic guitar on track 8, 19
- Milton Guedes - Harmonica on track 5
- Renato Massa - Drums on tracks 7, 8, 10, 13, 17, 19, 20
- João Firmino - Percussion on tracks 1, 3, 4, 5, 6, 8, 11, 12, 14, 15, 18
- Zé Gomes - Percussion on tracks 1, 3, 4, 6, 11, 12, 14, 15, 18
- Dominguinhos - Accordion on track 3, 6, 12, 14, 15, 17
- Luiz Antônio - String arrangement on track 3, Piano on tracks 4, 7, 19, Keyboard on tracks 8, 9, 10, 13, 19, 20, arrangement on track 10, Ney on track 11, Steel drum on track 18
- Toti Cavalcanti - Flute
- Ricardo Rente - Soprano Saxophone
- Roberta Little - Choir on tracks 4, 14, lead vocals on track 17, 20
- Lucy Louro - Choir on tracks 4, 14, 20
- Fábio Mondego - Choir on tracks 4, 14, 20
- Otto Guerra - Choir on tracks 4, 14, 20
- Otonelson - Choir on tracks 4, 14
