= Zé Ramalho ao Vivo =

Zé Ramalho ao vivo

Live album by Zé Ramalho
- Released: 2005
- Recorded: March 11, 2005-March 12, 2005
- Venue: Olympia, São Paulo
- Genre: MPB
- Length: 76:08
- Label: Sony BMG
- Producer: Robertinho de Recife, Zé Ramalho

Zé Ramalho chronology
Estação Brasil (2003)	Zé Ramalho ao vivo (2005)	Parceria dos Viajantes (2007)

Zé Ramalho ao vivo is the first (and currently only) live album by Brazilian solo artist Zé Ramalho, apart from his live recorded performances with other artists. It was released in 2005.

== Track listing ==
No.	Title	Music	Length
1.	"A dança das borboletas" (The Dance of the Butterflies)	Zé Ramalho, Alceu Valença	7:01
2.	"Táxi-lunar" (Moon-Taxi)	Zé Ramalho, Alceu Valença, Geraldo Azevedo	3:57
3.	"Banquete de signos" (Signs' Banquet)	Zé Ramalho	3:03
4.	"Canção agalopada" (Galloped Song)	Zé Ramalho	4:55
5.	"Eternas ondas" (Eternal Waves)	Zé Ramalho	4:21
6.	"Avôhai"	Zé Ramalho	5:37
7.	"Vila do Sossego" (Village of Tranquility)	Zé Ramalho	4:12
8.	"Chão de giz" (Chalk Ground)	Zé Ramalho	4:59
9.	"Garoto de aluguel (Taxi Boy)" (Boy for Rent (Taxi Boy))	Zé Ramalho	4:56
10.	"Admirável Gado Novo" (Brave New Cattle)	Zé Ramalho	5:56
11.	"Batendo na porta do céu" (Knockin' on Heaven's Door)	Bob Dylan, version by Zé Ramalho	3:57
12.	"Sinônimos" (Synonyms)	César Augusto, Paulo Sérgio, Cláudio Noam	6:29
13.	"Entre a serpente e a estrela (Amarillo by money)" (Between the Snake and the Star (Yellow by Money))	Aldir Blanc, Terry Sttaford, P. Fraser	3:43
14.	"Mistério da meia-noite" (Mystery of Midnight)	Zé Ramalho	3:36
15.	"Frevo Mulher" (Woman Frevo)	Zé Ramalho	5:10
16.	"Corações Animais" (Animal Hearts)	Luciana Browne, Vinícius, Fátima Leão	4:16

== Personnel ==
- Zé Ramalho – Lead vocals, acoustic guitar, arrangements
- Chico Guedes – Bass guitar
- Sandro Moreno – Drums, Cajón
- Zé Gomes – Percussion
- Marcos Amma – Percussion
- Dodô de Moraes – Keyboards
- Toti Cavalcanti – Wind instruments
- Rick Ferreira – Electric guitar, acoustic guitar, steel guitar, arrangement on "Corações Animais"
- Robertinho de Recife – Electric guitar and bass guitar on "Corações Animais"
- Luiz Antônio – Arrangement and keyboards on "Corações Animais"
- Gabriel Martau – Drums on "Corações Animais"
