= Zé Ramalho Canta Bob Dylan – Tá Tudo Mudando =

Studio album by Zé Ramalho
- Released: 2008
- Recorded: 2008
- Genre: MPB, rock and roll, folk rock
- Length: 57:12
- Label: EMI Music Brasil
- Producer: Robertinho de Recife

Zé Ramalho chronology
| Zé Ramalho da Paraíba (2008) | Zé Ramalho Canta Bob Dylan – Tá Tudo Mudando (2008) | Zé Ramalho Canta Luiz Gonzaga (2009) |

Zé Ramalho Canta Bob Dylan – Tá Tudo Mudando is the second tribute album by Brazilian singer-songwriter Zé Ramalho, released in 2008. This time, he pays an homage to Bob Dylan, whose "Knockin' on Heaven's Door" had already been covered by him. Most of the songs' lyrics were almost literally rewritten to Portuguese. The album cover is a reference to Dylan's known promotional film clip for the 1965 song "Subterranean Homesick Blues". "O Vento Vai Responder", a cover of "Blowin' in the Wind", was used in the soundtrack of the Rede Globo telenovela, Caminho das Índias.

The album was nominated for the 2009 Latin Grammy Award for Best Brazilian Rock Album., but lost it to Agora by NX Zero and Sacos Plásticos by Titãs, who shared the prize.

Before recording the final versions, all covers were taken by Sony Music Brazil president, Aloysio Reis, to the United States, so that Dylan and his staff could listen to it. Dylan reportedly approved all versions "with praise" All songs are sung in Portuguese, except "If Not for You". Ramalho says he thought that "covering a song like this one, singing in the natural language and arranging it the way I did, with a galloping northeastern rhythm, it would be interesting, and I think it was! This arrangement is also inspired by the recording of this song that George Harrison did in his album All Things Must Pass."

== Track listing ==
Literal translations of Portuguese song titles in parentheses.

| No. | Title | Music | Length |
|---|---|---|---|
| 1. | "Wigwam / Para Dylan" (Wigwam / For Dylan) | Zé Ramalho | 5:06 |
| 2. | "O Homem Deu Nome a Todos Animais" (Man Gave Names to All the Animals) | Bob Dylan, version by Zé Ramalho. | 5:28 |
| 3. | "Tá Tudo Mudando" (Everything's Changing) | Bob Dylan, version by Gabriel Moura | 4:13 |
| 4. | "Como uma Pedra a Rolar" (Like a Rolling Stone) | Bob Dylan, version by Zé Ramalho | 6:24 |
| 5. | "Negro Amor" (Dark Love) | Bob Dylan, version by Caetano Veloso | 5:05 |
| 6. | "Não Pense Duas Vezes, Tá Tudo Bem" (Don't Think Twice, It's All Right) | Bob Dylan, version by Zé Ramalho | 4:31 |
| 7. | "Rock Feelingood" | Bob Dylan, version by Zé Ramalho | 4:16 |
| 8. | "O Vento Vai Responder" (The Wind is Going to Answer) | Bob Dylan, version by Zé Ramalho | 4:07 |
| 9. | "Mr. do Pandeiro" (Mr. of the Pandeiro) | Bob Dylan, version by Bráulio Tavares | 6:44 |
| 10. | "O Amanhã é Distante" (Tomorrow is Distant) | Bob Dylan, version by Geraldo Azevedo and Babal | 4:53 |
| 11. | "If Not for You" | Bob Dylan | 3:57 |
| 12. | "Batendo na Porta do Céu – versão II" (Knockin' on Heaven's Door – version II) | Bob Dylan, version by Zé Ramalho | 3:20 |

== Personnel ==
- Zé Ramalho – Acoustic guitar, arrangements, lead vocals
- João Ramalho – Acoustic guitar
- Roberto Frejat – Electric guitar on "Rock Feelingood", sitar, bass guitar and twelve-string viola on "O homem deu nome a todos animais"
- Phil Braga – Lead acoustic guitar, slide guitar and twelve-string viola
- Chico Guedes – Bass guitar
- Dodô Moraes – Keyboards and accordion
- Zé Gomes – Percussion
- Eduardo Gema – Cajón
- Eduardo Constant – Snare drum and cymbals
- Robertinho de Recife – Arrangements
- Roberta de Recife, Robenita Moraes and Alessandro Rocha – Choir

== See also ==
- List of songs written by Bob Dylan
- List of artists who have covered Bob Dylan songs
