= A Terceira Lâmina =

Studio album by Zé Ramalho
- Released: 1981
- Recorded: 1981
- Genre: MPB
- Length: 35:15; 43:46 (Remastered version)
- Label: Epic (CBS – Sony Music)
- Producer: Zé Ramalho and Mauro Motta

Zé Ramalho chronology
A Peleja do Diabo com o Dono do Céu (1980)	A Terceira Lâmina (1981)	Força Verde (1982)

A Terceira Lâmina is the fourth solo album by Brazilian musician Zé Ramalho. It was released in 1981 and it helped increase his popularity. As its two predecessors, the album mixes Northeast Brazil and rock influences.

The opening track, "Canção Agalopada", features soprano Maria Lúcia Godoy and was based on a poem by Ramalho which was featured in his 1977 book Apocalipse (Apocalypse), and which uses the cordel forms martelo agalopado and galope à beira-mar. From this same book, Ramalho developed the trilogy "Beira-Mar", "Beira-Mar – Capítulo II" and "Beira-Mar – Capítulo Final", which appear, respectively on the albums A Peleja do Diabo com o Dono do Céu (1979), A Força Verde (1982) and Eu Sou Todos Nós (1998).

In a 2020 analysis for his blog at G1, Mauro Ferreira called the album "incisive", but compared it unfavorably to Ramalho's two previous efforts.

The title track, according to Ramalho, "talks about the third child, my third phase - and the view of the third World War".

== Track listing ==
1. "Canção agalopada" (Galoped Song) (featuring Maria Lúcia Godoy) – 5:00
2. "Filhos de Ícaro" (Sons of Icarus) – 3:00
3. "A terceira lâmina" (The Third Blade) – 4:16
4. "Um pequeno xote" (A Small Schottische) – 2:13
5. "Atrás do balcão" (Behind the Bar) – 4:02
6. "Galope rasante" (Rising Galop) – 3:36
7. "Kamikaze" – 3:20
8. "Violar" (It's a verb, means lit. To Acoustic Guitar, but the idea is To play the acoustic guitar) – 1:23
9. "Cavalos do cão" (Horses of the Devil) (featuring Elba Ramalho) – 3:24
10. "Ave de prata" (Silver Bird) – 2:45
11. "Dia dos adultos" (Adults' Day) – 2:16

=== 2003 re-issue bonus tracks ===
12. "Dia dos adultos" (Adults' Day) – 2:16
13. "Eternas Ondas" (Eternal Waves) – 3:51
14. "A terceira lâmina" (The Third Blade) – 2:56
15. "Mestiça" (Mestizo) – 2:59

All music by Zé Ramalho.

== Personnel ==
- Zé Ramalho – Acoustic guitar, twelve-string guitar, triangle, bass drum, lead vocals
- Elba Ramalho — lead vocals on "Cavalos do Cão"
- Maria Lúcia Godoy — operatic vocals on "Canção Agalopada"
- José Severo da Silva — accordion on "Um Pequeno Xote"
- Miguel Cidras — string arrangement on "A Terceira Lâmina"
- Frederico Mendes — cover picture

Personnel per source.
