= Zé Ramalho da Paraíba =

Compilation album by Zé Ramalho
- Released: 2008
- Recorded: Between 1973-1977
- Genre: MPB
- Label: Discoberta

Zé Ramalho chronology
Parceria dos Viajantes (2007)	Zé Ramalho da Paraíba (2008)	Zé Ramalho Canta Bob Dylan – Tá Tudo Mudando (2008)

Zé Ramalho da Paraíba is a compilation of rare songs by Brazilian solo artist Zé Ramalho in 2008. Most of the tracks were recorded live, in a time they were still unknown. Avôhai (a tribute to Ramalho's grandfather), for example, was performed only three days after his death (as said in the beginning of the song), but became a hit single years after.

== Track listing ==
1. Táxi-lunar (Moon-Taxi) – 5:26 (Zé Ramalho, Alceu Valença, Geraldo Azevedo)
2. Jacarepaguá blues – 8:34
3. O author da natureza (The Author of Nature) – 4:39
4. Brejo do Cruz – 5:02
5. Puxa-puxa (Pull-pull) – 2:14
6. Luciela – 7:09
7. Paraíba hospitaleira (Hospitable Paraíba) – 2:26
8. Terremotos (Earthquakes) – 3:32
9. Falido transatlântico (Broken Transatlantics) – 3:59 (Marcus Vinícius)
10. A árvore (The Tree) – 6:23
11. A peleja de Apolo e Pan (The Match of Apolo e Pan) – 3:59
12. O astronauta (The Astronaut) – 6:54
13. Meninas de Albarã (Albarã Girls) – 3:10
14. Aboio Eletrônico (Electronic Aboio) – 4:27
15. O sobrevivente (The Survivor) – 4:54
16. Jardim das Acácias (Acacia Garden) – 8:53
17. Avôhai – 10:03
18. Adeus segunda-feira cinzenta (Goodbye, Grey Monday) – 9:11
19. A dança das borboletas (The Dance of The Butterflies) – 10:37 (Zé Ramalho, Alceu Valença)
20. O Monte Olímpia (The Mount Olimpia) – 7:40
21. Admirável Gado Novo (Brave New Cattle) – 6:03

All music & lyrics by Zé Ramalho, except where noted

== Personnel ==
- Zé Ramalho – Lead vocals, rhythm guitar on tracks 1 to 8, acoustic guitar on tracks 9, 10, 11, 12, 13, 14, 15, 18, 19, lead guitar on tracks 20, 21
- Josué – Electric guitar on tracks 1 to 8
- Wallace – Bass guitar on tracks 1 to 8
- Hugo Leão – Bass guitar on tracks 9, 10, 11, 12, 13, 14 organ on tracks 9, 10, 11, 12, 13, 14 backing vocals on tracks 9, 10, 11, 12, 13, 14, keyboard on track 20
- Baby – Bass guitar on tracks 20
- Paulo Batera – Drums on tracks 1 to 8, 20
- Irapuan – Drums on tracks 9, 10, 11, 12, 13, 14
- Jarbas Mariz – Percussion on tracks 1 to 8, viola on track 20, backing vocals on track 20
- Edmilson – Percussion and backing vocals on tracks 9, 11, 12, 13, 14
- Walmir – Percussion and backing vocals on tracks 9, 11, 12, 13, 14
