= Orquídea Negra =

Studio album by Zé Ramalho
- Released: 1983
- Recorded: April/March 1983
- Genre: MPB
- Length: 44:32; 51:19 (Remastered version)
- Label: Epic (CBS - Sony Music)
- Producer: Zé Ramalho and Mauro Motta

Zé Ramalho chronology
Força Verde (1982)	Orquídea Negra (1983)	Por Aquelas Que Foram Bem amadas (1984)

Orquídea Negra is the sixth solo album by Brazilian musician Zé Ramalho. It was released in 1983. The album featured several guest artists. Ramalho, who believes in extra and intraterrestrial beings, once said that a man who introduced himself as a member of the Illuminati told him that with the song "Kryptônia" they managed to make contact with some "species".

== Track listing ==
No.	Title	Music	Length
1.	"Orquídea negra (featuring Fagner)" (Dark Orchid)	Jorge Mautner	5:21
2.	"Para chegar mais perto de Deus (featuring Egberto Gismonti)" (To get closer to God)	Zé Ramalho	4:32
3.	"Kryptônia (featuring Manito)" (Krypton)	Zé Ramalho	4:48
4.	"Táxi-lunar (featuring A Cor do Som)" (Moon taxi)	Zé Ramalho, Geraldo Azevedo, Alceu Valença	3:59
5.	"Coração de rubi (featuring Maria Lúcia Godoy)" (Ruby Heart)	Zé Ramalho, Maria Lúcia Godoy	3:47
6.	"Filhos do câncer" (Cancer's Children)	Zé Ramalho, Fagner	5:20
7.	"Napalm (featuring Robertinho de Recife)"	Zé Ramalho, Robertinho de Recife	6:07
8.	"Dominó (featuring Armandinho and the Trio Elétrico Dodô and Osmar)" (Dominoes)	Zé Ramalho	3:00
9.	"Xote dos poetas (Featuring Fagner)" (Schottische of the Poets)	Zé Ramalho, Capinan	4:39
10.	"Embolada violada" ("Embolada" is a type of art from the Northeastern of Brazil. "Violada" refers to something that has been transformed into music with a guitar, so the lit. translation would be "Guitared Embolada")	Zé Ramalho, Capinan	2:59

=== 2003 Re-issue ===
No.	Title	Length
1.	"Os dozes trabalhos de Hércules" (The Twelve Labours of Hercules)	4:15
2.	"A última nau" (The Last Carrack)	3:36

== Personnel ==
- Zé ramalho - Lead vocals, acoustic guitar, twelve-string guitar, caxixi, violas, bass drum, pandeiro, triangle.
