= Frevoador =

Studio album by Zé Ramalho
- Released: 1992
- Recorded: February 1992
- Genre: MPB
- Length: 46:05
- Label: Columbia (Sony Music)
- Producer: Zé Ramalho, Luís Fernando Borges; Mariozinho Rocha ("Entre a Serpente e a Estrela" only); Zé Ramalho e Mauro Motta ("Porta Secreta" only)

Zé Ramalho chronology
Brasil Nordeste (1991)	Frevoador (1992)	Cidades e Lendas (1996)

Professional ratings
Review scores
Source	Rating
Allmusic	3/5 stars

Frevoador is the twelfth solo album by Brazilian musician Zé Ramalho. It was released in 1992, after a four-year gap with no albums. When promoting his next album Cidades e Lendas, he said he wasn't satisfied with the final result of Frevoador, suggesting the repertoire and the session musicians weren't the right ones.

== Track listing ==
No.	Title	Music	Length
1.	"Frevoador (Hurricane)"	Bob Dylan, Jacques Levy, version by Zé Ramalho	3:03
2.	"Serpentária" (Hidden track: Everybody's Talking, by Fred Neil)	Zé Ramalho, Sivuca, Glorinha Gadelha	2:20
3.	"Nona nuvem" (Ninth Cloud)	Zé Ramalho, Vital Farias	4:04
4.	"Da mãe" (Of the Mother)	Zé Ramalho	2:02
5.	"Entre a serpente e a estrela (Amarillo by Morning)" (Between the Sperpent and the Star (Amarillo by Money)	Paul Fraser, Terry Stafford, version by Aldir Blanc	2:59
6.	"Cidadão" (Citizen)	Lucio Barbosa	3:50
7.	"A história do Jeca que virou Elvis Presley" (The Story of the Jeca who became Elvis Presley)	Zé Ramalho, Carlos Fernando	2:56
8.	"Botas de sete léguas" (Seven-league boots)	Zé Ramalho, Hugo Leão	5:18
9.	"Porta secreta" (Secret Door)	Zé Ramalho	3:44
10.	"Do terceiro milênio para frente - parte II" (From the 3rd Millennium On - Part II)	Zé Ramalho, Oliveira de Panelas	3:37
11.	"Sensual" (Sexy)	Tavito, Aldir Blanc	3:31
12.	"Dona Chica (Francisca Santos das Flores)" (Mrs Chica (Francisca Santos das Flores))	Dorival Caymmi	5:24
13.	"Pai e mãe" (Father and Mother)	Gilberto Gil	3:17

== Personnel ==
- Zé Ramalho - Lead vocals, acoustic guitar, viola on track 10
- Waltel blanco - Acoustic guitar on track 9
- Geraldo Azevedo - Acoustic guitar on track 4, 8
- Rafael Rabello - Seven-string guitar on track 9
- Joel do Bandolim - Mandolin on track 9
- Chico Guedes - Bass guitar on tracks 1, 2, 4
- Mingo Araújo - Percussion
- Gustavo Schröeter - Drums
- Ricardo Rente - Saxophone on track 1, Flute on track 3, soprano saxophone on track 8
- Ciro Telles - Piano, keyboard
- Marcos de Lima - Keyboard on tracks 1, 7, piano on tracks 5, 6
- Júlio Silva - Electric guitar on track 1, 6, 7, twelve-string guitar on track 2, 5
- Felipe Freire - Electric guitar on track 2, 3
- André Araújo - Violin
- Genaro - Accordion on tracks 5, 10
- Franklin - Flute on track 9
- Gílson de Freitas - Pandeiro on track 9
