= Opus Visionário =

Studio album by Zé Ramalho
- Released: 1986
- Genre: MPB
- Length: 35:42
- Label: Epic (CBS - Sony Music)
- Producer: Mauro Motta

Zé Ramalho chronology
De Gosto de Água e de Amigos (1985)	Opus Visionário (1986)	Décimas de um Cantador (1987)

Opus Visionário is the ninth solo album by Brazilian musician Zé Ramalho. It was released in 1986. Geraldo Azevedo, a famous Brazilian MPB singer, made a guest appearance in the track "Pedras e moças".

== Track listing ==
No.	Title	Music	Length
1.	"Zyliana" (Contains the hidden track "O Guarani" (The Guarani), by Carlos Gomes)	Zé Ramalho	2:07
2.	"Um índio" (An Indian)	Caetano Veloso	4:08
3.	"Quasar do sertão" (Quasar of the Sertão); Contains the hidden track "Hora do almoço" (Lunch Time) by Belchior)	Zé Ramalho, Flavíola, Belchior	1:58
4.	"Parceria (featuring Cláudia Olivetti)" (Partnership)	Zé Ramalho, Cláudia Olivetti	4:09
5.	"Bê"	Zé Ramalho	3:36
6.	"Visionária" (Visionary)	Zé Ramalho	5:01
7.	"Botões de osso" (Bone Buttons)	Zé Ramalho	3:54
8.	"Tamarineira village"	Zé Ramalho	3:05
9.	"Olhares sem destino" (Looks Without Fate)	Zé Ramalho, Téo Azevedo	3:33
10.	"Pedras e moças" (Stones and Girls)	Zé Ramalho, Geraldo Azevedo	4:11

== Personnel ==
- Zé Ramalho - Lead vocals, acoustic guitar
- Geraldo Azevedo - Acoustic guitar
- Joca - Acoustic guitar and guitar solo on track 6
- Mauro Motta - Choir Emulator and Bells on track 6 Programming
- Lincoln Olivetti - Bass emulator & sound effects on track 6, Programming
- Robson Jorge - Programming
- Ariovaldo - Tumbadora on tracks 1, 7, triangle on tracks 1, 7, cincerro on track 1, 9, Xique-Xique on track 7, Maraca on track 7, Kiko on track 7
- Fernandinho - Bass guitar
- Neguinho - Drums
- Mingo Araújo - Conga, gong, Russian spoon, Berra-boi
- Claudia Olivetti - Choir
- Cláudia Telles - Choir
- Myriam Peracchi - Choir
- Rosana - Choir
- Sônia Bonfá - Choir
