= Eu Sou Todos Nós =

Studio album by Zé Ramalho
- Released: 1998
- Recorded: July/August 1998
- Genre: MPB
- Length: 38:28
- Label: BMG
- Producer: Robertinho de Recife

Zé Ramalho chronology
| Antologia Acústica (1997) | Eu Sou Todos Nós (1998) | Nação Nordestina (2000) |

Eu Sou Todos Nós is the fourteenth studio album by Brazilian solo artist Zé Ramalho. It was released in 1998. The album cover is a composite of pictures of several people, forming the face of Zé Ramalho, which is an allusion to the album's title, "Eu Sou Todos Nós", which translates as "I Am All Of Us". It sold more than 100,000 copies in the first month and it had reached the 190,000 mark by April of the next year.

It succeeds the well-sold compilation Antologia Acústica. According to Ramalho, BMG would probably rather release an Antologia 2 of sorts, but the "natural sequence" for him was an album of new songs. In the contract with BMG, Ramalho managed to negotiate a three-album deal, including this effort, Nação Nordestina and Zé Ramalho Canta Raul Seixas - both of the latter already had their names defined at that time.

== Song information ==
"Beira-Mar – Capítulo Final" is the conclusion of a trilogy started on "Beira-Mar" (from 1979's A Peleja do Diabo com o Dono do Céu) and continued on "Beira-Mar – Capítulo II" (from 1982's A Força Verde).

The album features a protest song called "Sem Terra". Ramalho commented it: "Nowadays it is out of fashion, but if I had done it in the times of the military, I would have been arrested and tortured to the soul. I used the structure of the protest song, of the festivals. It is a dialogue with 'Caminhando', by Geraldo Vandré."

"Agônico - O Canto" is a version with lyrics of an instrumental track named "Agônico" (named as such by Jorge Mautner) which was featured on Ramalho's sophomore album, A Peleja do Diabo com o Dono do Céu (1979).

== Track listing ==
All music is composed by Zé Ramalho, except where specified

| No. | Title | Length |
|---|---|---|
| 1. | "Falido Transalântico" (Broken Transatlantic; music by Marcus Vinícius) | 3:01 |
| 2. | "Metrópolis Dourada" (Golden Metropolis) | 2:38 |
| 3. | "Companheira de Alta Luz" (Companion of High Light; music by Ramalho and Fausto Nilo) | 4:23 |
| 4. | "Beira-Mar - Capítulo Final" (Near The Sea - Final Chapter) | 4:23 |
| 5. | "Errare humanum est" (To Err is Human; music by Jorge Ben Jor) | 3:49 |
| 6. | "Litúrgica" (Liturgical) | 1:39 |
| 7. | "Vermelhos" (Red) | 3:16 |
| 8. | "A Peleja de Zé Limeira no Final do Segundo Milênio" (The Match of Zé Limeira by the End of the Second Millennium) | 3:01 |
| 9. | "Sem Terra" (Landless) | 2:59 |
| 10. | "Martelo Rap Ecológico" (Martelo Ecological Rap) | 3:27 |
| 11. | "Agônico – o Canto" (Agonic - The Singing) | 2:15 |
| 12. | "Das Maravilhas" (Of the Wonders) | 3:37 |

== Personnel ==
- Zé Ramalho - Lead vocals on all tracks, arrangement on all tracks except for 10 and 12, Viola on all tracks except for 12, Harmonica on track 2
- Naná Tribuzy - Lead vocals on track 4
- Robertinho de Recife - Electric guitar on tracks 1, 2, 3, 5, 12, arrangement on tracks 4, 8, Sitar on track 8
- Chico Guedes - Bass guitar on tracks 1, 3, 5, 8
- Paulo César Barros - Bass guitar on tracks 2, 4, 7, 9
- Luiz Antônio - Arrangement on tracks 1, 4, 7, 10, 12, Keyboard on all tracks except for 9
- Renato Massa - Drums on tracks 1, 2, 4, 7, 9
- Gustavo Schröeter - Drums on tracks 3, 5, 8
- João Firmino - Zabumba on tracks 2, 4, 7, 9, percussion on tracks 5, 8
- Zé Gomes - Percussion on tracks 4, 5, 7, 8, 9
- Waldonys - Accordion on tracks 2, 9, 10
- Dominguinhos - Accordion on tracks 4, 7
- César Micheles - Flute on tracks 4, 9
- Roberta Little - Choir on tracks 1, 3, 7, 8
- Fábio Mondego - Choir on tracks 1, 3, 8
- Lúcia Perez - Choir on tracks 1, 3, 7, 8
- Naná Tribuzy - Choir on tracks 1, 3, 7, 8
- Tadeu Mathias - Choir on tracks 1, 3, 7, 8
- Geraldo Amaral - Choir on tracks 1, 3, 7, 8
