= Sinais dos Tempos =

Studio album by Zé Ramalho
- Released: 2012
- Recorded: Robertinho de Recife Studios, Barra da Tijuca, Rio de Janeiro - second semester of 2011; Guitar solo by Jesse Robinson recorded at Terminal Recording Studios in Jackson, Mississippi
- Genre: MPB, forró, rock
- Label: Avôhai Music
- Producer: Zé Ramalho and Robertinho de Recife

Zé Ramalho chronology
Zé Ramalho Canta Beatles (2010)	Sinais dos Tempos (2012)	Ateu Psicodélico (2022)

Sinais dos Tempos is the nineteenth album by Brazilian solo artist Zé Ramalho, the first released through his new and own record label, Avôhai Music, and also the first after four consecutive tribute albums.

The track "Indo com o Tempo" makes a reference to his cocaine addiction, in the words "fase negra" (dark chapter). His son João Ramalho guest sings on the album.

Ramalho said he wanted to release an original album in 2012 because it is the year in which the Mayan calendar ended and many people believe that this will be the end of the world.

After I reached my sixties, it seems like the years are rushing by. Time goes by fast and this reminds me of a song by Rolling Stones, "Time Is on My Side". I see myself in a crazy, fast and cruel world and having to be inspired by it to make my work of art. Fans had been asking me for an album with original songs, but I spent the last five years reflecting about changes that occurred and making music slowly. "Sinais" is a track that talks about it. I had a moment in which I cried during the recording of the vocals, as I remembered many things. I hope I manage to pass this emotion to the people.

== Reception ==
Professional ratings
Review scores
Source	Rating
O Estado de S. Paulo	3/5 stars
Folha de S.Paulo	3/5 stars
Rolling Stone Brasil	3/5 stars

The album received general positive reviews from the critics.

Jotabê Medeiros, from O Estado de S. Paulo, praised the album, giving it a three-star rank, stating that "bluesy guitars join the zabumba and the accordion and the manure mushrooms mix with the memories of the LSD in an album that would invent the career of a popular hero. Zé Ramalho is in quite a nostalgic vibe". Medeiros, however, says that "the lyrics, one of his trumps, are irregular: there are memorable findings and there are bad things. But it is a new pack of prophecies of Zé".

Thales de Menezes, from Folha de S.Paulo, gave 3/5 stars and says the album contains songs about the passage of time and the certainty of death, though it is not pessimist nor dark. He adds that "At the age of 62, the singer seems reinvigorated with the interest from a young audience - his performance at SWU 2011 was a celebration".

Cristiano Bastos from Rolling Stone Brasil also gave it a 3/5 star rank and stated that "in Sinais dos Tempos [...], he is back to 'himself'. That is, an outstanding artist, capable of creating inspired songs like 'Indo com o Tempo', 'O Começo da Visão' e 'Rio Paraíba'"

== Track listing ==
All tracks are written by Zé Ramalho.

No.	Title	Length
1.	"Indo Com o Tempo (featuring Jesse Robinson)" (Going with Time)	4:40
2.	"Sinais" (Signs)	4:28
3.	"Lembranças do Primeiro" (Memories of the First)	4:00
4.	"Olhar Alquimista" (Alchemist Look)	5:24
5.	"O Que Ainda Vai Nascer" (What Will Still Be Born)	5:08
6.	"Justiça Cega" (Blind Justice)	4:00
7.	"Um Pouco do Que Queira" (A Little of What You May Want)	3:53
8.	"O Começo da Visão" (The Beginning of the Vision)	3:21
9.	"A Noite Branca" (The White Night)	3:42
10.	"Portal dos Destinos" (Destinies Portal)	4:51
11.	"Rio Paraíba" (Paraíba River)	4:16
12.	"Anúncio Final" (Final Announcement)	4:43

== Personnel ==
=== Musicians ===
- Zé Ramalho - Viola and lead vocals, rhythm arrangement on all tracks except on "Indo Com o Tempo", "Um Pouco do Que Queira" and "A Noite Branca", producer
- Robertinho de Recife - producer, arrangements, guitar on "Sinais", electronic effects on "Anúncio Final"
- Chico Guedes - Bass guitar
- Dodô de Moraes - Hammond on "Indo Com o Tempo" keyboards on "Sinais", "Olhar Alquimista", "O Que Ainda Vai Nascer", "O Começo da Visão" and "Sinais", chorus on "Sinais" and "Olhar Alquimista", piano on "Lembranças do Primeiro" and "Justiça Cega", string arrangements on "Lembranças do Primeiro", moog on "O Que Ainda Vai Nascer", accordion on "Justiça Cega" and "Um Pouco do Que Queira", marimba on "O Começo da Visão", hindus programming on "Portal dos Destinos", electronic voices on "Anúncio Final"
- Edu Constant - Drums
- Toti Cavalcanti - Tenor saxophone on "Indo Com o Tempo", "Justiça Cega" and "A Noite Branca", brass arrangement on "Indo Com o Tempo" and "A Noite Branca"
- Jefferson Victor - trumpet on "Indo Com o Tempo" and "A Noite Branca"
- Zé Gomes - effects on "Sinais", "Olhar Alquimista", "O Que Ainda Vai Nascer" and "Justiça Cega", percussion on all songs except "Indo Com o Tempo", "Lembranças do Primeiro", "Começo da Visão" and "Anúncio Final", zabumba on "Um Pouco do Que Queira" and "A Noite Branca"
- Jesse Robinson - guitar solo on "Indo Com o Tempo""
- Kátia Nascimento - trombone on "Indo Com o Tempo" and "A Noite Branca"
- João Ramalho - choir on "Olhar Alquimista" and "Um Pouco do Que Queira", rhythm arrangement on "Um Pouco do Que Queira"
- Phil Braga - slide guitar on "Olhar Alquimista"
- Rick Ferreira - steel guitar on "O Começo da Visão"
- Roberta de Recife - female vocalise on "O Começo da Visão"
- Cezinha - accordion on "A Noite Branca" and "Rio Paraíba"

=== Studio staff ===
- Amaury Machado mixing
- Cláudia André - assistant producer
- Cover artwork and pictures: Robertinho de Recife
- Studio Pictures - Carlos Dias

=== American technical team ===
- Carl Kolb - executive manager
- Randy Everett - recording engineer
- Robert, Tuyet Kim - assistant producers
