= Zé Ramalho Canta Jackson do Pandeiro =

Studio album by Zé Ramalho
- Released: 2010
- Genre: MPB, forró
- Length: 38:09
- Label: Discobertas

Zé Ramalho chronology
Zé Ramalho Canta Luiz Gonzaga (2009)	Zé Ramalho Canta Jackson do Pandeiro (2010)	Zé Ramalho Canta Beatles (2011)

Zé Ramalho Canta Jackson do Pandeiro is the fourth tribute album by Brazilian solo artist Zé Ramalho, the third consecutive one. This time, he pays a tribute to his influence Jackson do Pandeiro.

== Track listing ==
No.	Title	Music	Length
1.	"Lamento Cego" (Blind Regret)	Jackson do Pandeiro	4:02
2.	"Ele Disse" (He Said)	Edgar Ferreira	3:14
3.	"Forró do Surubim" (Forró of the Surubim)	José Batista, Antonio Barros	2:58
4.	"Forró da Gafieira" (Forro of the Gafieira)	Rosil Cavalcanti	2:28
5.	"O Canto da Ema" (The Singing of the Greater Rhea)	Alventino Cavalcanti, D. Ayres Viana, João do Vale	3:12
6.	"Sebastiana / Um a Um / Chiclete com Banana" (Sebastiana / One on One / Gum with Banana)		2:57
7.	"Chiclete com Banana (featuring Waldonys)" (Gum with Banana)	Almira Castilho, Gordurinha	2:57
8.	"Cantiga do Sappo" (Little Song of the Frog)	Jackson do Pandeiro, Buco do Pandeiro	4:07
9.	"Casaca de Couro" (Leather White Tie)	Rui de Moraes e Silva	2:36
10.	"Quadro-Negro" (Black Board)	Jackson do Pandeiro, Rosil Cavalcanti	2:22
11.	"Cabeça Feita"	Jackson do Pandeiro, Sebastião Batista da Silva	2:59
12.	"Lá Vai a Boiada" (Here it Goes the Cattle)	Jackson do Pandeiro, Manoel Pedro	4:17

== Personnel ==
- Zé Ramalho – acoustic guitar on tracks 1, 2, 4, 8, 10, 11, 12, lead vocals on all tracks, viola on track 7
- Waldonys – lead vocals on track 7
