= Asa Branca =

1947 Portuguese-language song

Song
- Language: Portuguese
- Released: 1947
- Songwriters: Luiz Gonzaga; Humberto Teixeira

"Asa Branca" is a song written by Luiz Gonzaga and Humberto Teixeira in 1947. The asa-branca ("white wing") of the title is the picazuro pigeon. With its departure the desolation of the parched sertão (the arid backcountry) is complete, and the protagonist of the song, unable to make a living, must leave the sertão and his lady-love Rosinha. The song closes with his promise to return.

== Covers ==
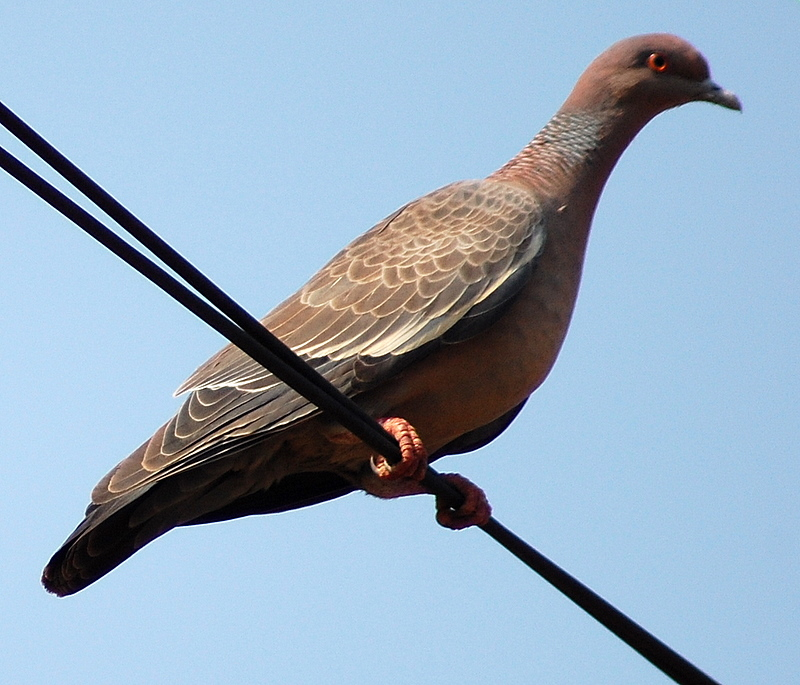
The picazuro pigeon, called pomba-asa-branca or white-winged dove in Portuguese.

- Eliane Elias included the song in her 1994 album Solos and Duets.
- Raul Seixas has written an English version of the song under the title "White Wings". It has been released only after his death, in the compilation Documento from 1998.
- It has been covered by Zé Ramalho in his 2003 album Estação Brasil. It is about the droughts that often afflict the sertão of the Brazilian Northeast.

== Recognition ==
The song was voted by the Brazilian edition of Rolling Stone as the 4th greatest Brazilian song.

== A Volta da Asa-Branca ==
"A Volta da Asa-Branca" (The Return of the White-wing) is a sequel to "Asa Branca". It marks the return of rain, the asa-branca, and the protagonist to the sertão. The song celebrates the return of life to the sertão, and the protagonist's reunion with Rosinha, whom he plans to marry at the end of the year.
