= Parceria dos Viajantes =

Studio album by Zé Ramalho
- Released: March 27, 2007
- Genre: MPB
- Length: 45:51
- Label: BMG
- Director: Rodrigo Negrão
- Producer: Robertinho de Recife

Zé Ramalho chronology
Zé Ramalho ao vivo (2006)	Parceria dos Viajantes (2007)	Zé Ramalho da Paraíba (2008)

Parceria dos Viajantes is the eighteenth album by Brazilian solo artist Zé Ramalho. It was released in 2007. the album features several famous Brazilian artists, like Zélia Duncan, Daniela Mercury and Pitty, as well as American singer-songwriter Alana Marie.

== Track listing ==
No.	Title	Lyrics	Music	Length
1.	"O rei do rock" (The King of Rock)	Zeca Baleiro	Zé Ramalho	5:07
2.	"A nave interior (featuring Pitty)" (The Interior Ship)	Chico César	Zé Ramalho	4:37
3.	"Montarias sensuais" (Sensual Mounts)	Jorge Mautner	Zé Ramalho	4:10
4.	"O Norte do Norte (featuring Sandra de Sá)" (The North of the North)	Zé Nêumanne Pinto	Zé Ramalho	4:04
5.	"Do Muito e do Pouco" (Of the too many/much and of the too few/little)	Zé Ramalho	Oswaldo Montenegro	3:37
6.	"Procurando a estrela (featuring Daniela Mercury)" (Searching for the Star)	Zé Ramalho	Toti Cavalcanti	4:11
7.	"Farol dos Mundos" (Lighthouse of the Worlds)	Zé Ramalho	Robertinho de Recife	3:36
8.	"Pássaros Noturnos (featuring Chimbinha on the electric guitar and Juninho on drums, both from Banda Calypso)" (Nocturnal Birds)	Fausto Nilo	Zé Ramalho	3:09
9.	"Chamando o Silêncio (featuring Alana Marie)" (Calling The Silence; Recorded at the True Azul Studio, in New York City))	Zé Ramalho	Toni Garrido, Da Gama, Bino Farias, Lazão	4:46
10.	"Porta de luz (featuring Zélia Duncan)" (Light Door)	Zé Ramalho	Dominguinhos	4:18
11.	"As Aparências Enganam" (Appearances Fool)	Zé Ramalho	Chico Guedes	4:16

== Personnel ==
- Zé Ramalho – Acoustic guitar and lead vocals on all tracks, arrangement on tracks 1, 2, 3, 4, 5, 6, 11, keyboards on track 1, twelve-string viola on track 2, harmonica on track 2
- Robertinho de Recife – Arrangement on all tracks except for 9, electric guitar on tracks 1, 3, 4, 5, 6, 7, 11, ukulele on track 1, slide guitar on track 2, sound effects on track 2, bass guitar on tracks 3, 6, 7, 8, 9, 10, keyboards on track 7, sitar on track 10, Portuguese guitar on track 10
- Paulo Ricardo – Bass guitar on tracks 1, 2, 5
- Chico Guedes – Bass guitar on tracks 4, 11
- João Barone – Drums on tracks 1, 3, 5, 6, 7
- Marcelo Bonfá – Drums on track 2
- Edu Constant – Drums on tracks 4, 11
- Marcos Bolais – Keyboards on track 5
- Dodô de Moraes – Accordion on track 1, organ on track 1, keyboards on tracks 4, 6, 8
- Zé Gomes – Percussion on tracks 1, 3, 4, 5, 6, 7, 11
- Marcos Suzano – Percussion on track 10
- Jeferson Victor – Trumpet on track 1, 3
- Bidu Cordeiro – Trumpet on track 3
- Monteiro Jr. – Tenor saxophone on track 3
- Toti Cavalcanti – Bassoon on track 4, trumpet on track 8
- Roberta de Recife – Choir on tracks 5, 11, vocalise on track 7
- Zita, Diva, Edite, Francisco José, Mariana – Choir on track 5
- João Ramalho and Erika Valente – Choir on track 11
- Franco Sattamini – Arrangement and all other instruments (except for acoustic guitar and bass guitar) on track 9
