= Ave Sangria =

Brazilian rock band from Recife

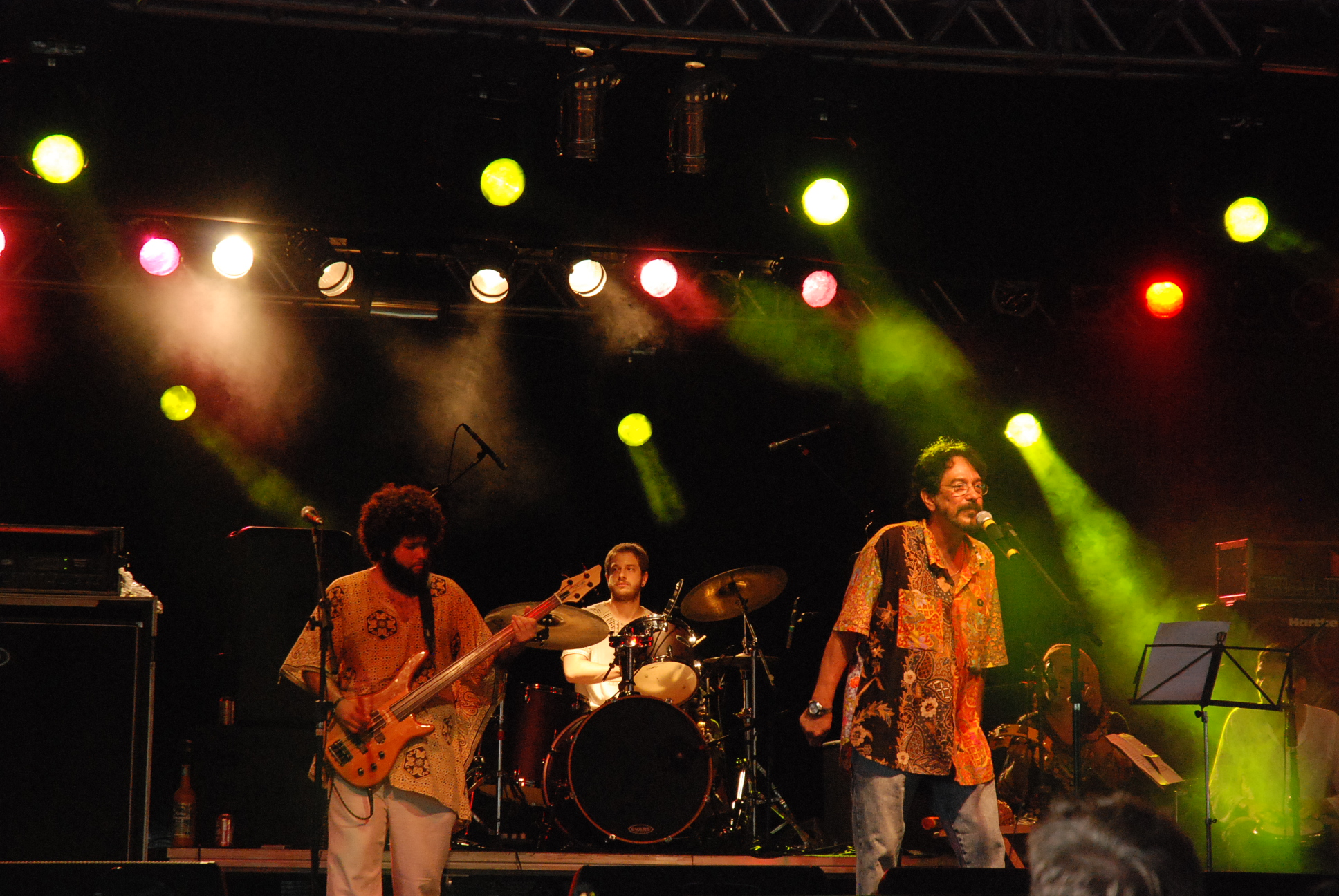
- Marco Polo and Anjo Gabriel band representing Ave Sangria at the 2011 Psicodália festival

Background information
- Origin: Recife, Pernambuco, Brazil
- Genres: Progressive rock; psychedelic rock; baião
- Years active: 1969–1974, 2014–present
- Label: RCA
- Members: Marco Polo; Ivson Wanderley; Almir de Oliveira; Zé da Flauta; Júnior do Jarro; Gilú Amaral; Juliano Holanda
- Past members: Israel Semente Proibida; Agrício Noya; Ivson Wanderley; Paulo Rafael
- Website: www.avesangria.com

Ave Sangria is a Brazilian rock band and one of the leading names of the 1970s psychedelic music scene of Pernambuco, along with Alceu Valença, Flaviola e O Bando do Sol, Lula Côrtes, Marconi Notaro and Lailson.

== History ==
=== 1970s ===
Most members were born and raised in Vila dos Comerciários, a poor neighborhood of Recife. In 1968, bassist Almir de Oliveira met singer Marco Polo and together they became the band's songwriters. Oliveira would play covers in local parties but he was willing to write original material, and so was Polo.

Initially called Tamarineira Village (after neighborhoods Greenwich Village in New York City and Tamarineira in Recife), the group performed under that name in 1973 in Salvador, Natal and João Pessoa.

They changed their name following a suggestion from a gypsy woman that they met in the countryside of Paraíba. Their initial line-up consisted of Marco Polo (lead vocals), Ivson Wanderley (lead and acoustic guitars), Paulo Raphael (rhythm and acoustic guitars, synthesizer, lead vocals), Almir de Oliveira (bass), Israel Semente (drums) and Agrício Noya (percussion). With this line-up they recorded their debut, self-titled album in Rio de Janeiro in May 1974; it was released in June of the same year.

The album was only sold for 1.5 months until it was censored by the Brazilian military government due to the lyrical content of the song "Seu Waldir". The cover also underwent changes, its original concept being described by the members as a "drag queen parrot".

The last performances by the band happened at Teatro de Santa Isabel in downtown Recife, on 28 and 29 December 1974.

The band, represented by Marco Polo, did a special performance in the 2011 Psicodália festival, accompanied by the group Anjo Gabriel.

=== Reunion after 40 years ===
In 2014, the band reunited for a series of shows celebrating the 40th anniversary of its debut album. The first one took place in 2 September at the Teatro de Santa Isabel. They also performed at the 2015 Psicodália, in Santa Catarina. Also around this time, their debut album was re-released in CD and LP formats; they also released a recording of their Perfumes y baratchos, their last.

On 26 April 2019, 45 years after their debut, they released a second album titled Vendavais, featuring three original members: Almir de Oliveira, Marco Pólo and Paulo Rafael (who would die in 2021). The album consisted of 11 original songs, composed between 1972 e 1974 and unreleased since then. It was released one of the 25 best Brazilian albums of the first semester of 2019 by the Associação Paulista de Críticos de Arte.

== Members ==
=== Current ===
- Marco Polo - vocals (1969–1974, 2014–present)
- Almir de Oliveira - guitar, acoustic guitar, bass (1969–1974, 2014–present)
- Júnior do Jarro - drums (2014–present)
- Gilú Amaral - percussion (2014–present)
- Juliano Holanda - bass (2014–present)

=== Former ===
- Israel Semente - drums, percussion and backing vocals (1969–1974; died in 1990)
- Agrício Noya - percussion (1969–1974; died in 2015)
- Ivinho - guitar (1969–1974, 2014–2015, his death)
- Paulo Rafael - guitar (1969–1974; 2014–2021, his death)

=== Touring members ===
- Zé da Flauta - western concert flute
- Ebel Perrelli - percussion (2011–present)
- Nando Barreto - bass and backing vocal (2011–present)
- Jerimum - percussion (2011)
- Marco da Lata - bass and backing vocals (2011)
- Cris Rás - guitar (2011)
- André Sette - keyboards (2011)
- Rodrigo Duplicata - drums (2011)
- Breno Lira - guitar (2011)
- Cassio Sette - keyboards and backing vocals (2011)
- Wellington Santana - bass and backing vocals

== Discography ==
=== Studio albums ===
- 1974 - Ave Sangria - RCA
- 2019 - Vendavais

=== Live albums ===
- 1974 - Perfumes e Baratchos

=== Singles ===
- 1974 - "O Pirata" - RCA
- 1975 - "Lá Fora" - RCA
- 2020 - "Janeiro"

=== Bootlegs ===
- 2009 - Tamarineira Village 1975 - ao vivo em Recife - CD Kopka
