= Cidades e Lendas =

Studio album by Zé Ramalho
- Released: 1996
- Recorded: June 1995
- Genre: MPB
- Length: 42:16
- Label: BMG; RCA (US)
- Producer: Zé Ramalho

Zé Ramalho chronology
| Frevoador (1992) | Cidades e Lendas (1996) | Antologia Acústica (1997) |

Professional ratings
Review scores
| Source | Rating |
|---|---|
| Allmusic | 4/5 stars |

Cidades e Lendas is the thirteenth solo album by Brazilian musician Zé Ramalho. It was released in 1996, after another four-year gap with no albums. It was released in a show at TUCA, São Paulo, around the time when his hit "Admirável Gado Novo" was featured at the soundtrack of Rede Globo's telenovela O Rei do Gado. When comparing this work with his previous effort, Frevoador, Ramalho said he was more satisfied this time because he had more time "to choose the best repertoire and invite the right people".

By the end of October 1998, it had sold 50,000 copies.

== Track listing ==
| No. | Title | Music | Length |
|---|---|---|---|
| 1. | "Cidades e lendas" (City and Legends) | Zé Ramalho, Fausto Nilo | 6:22 |
| 2. | "Leva eu sodade" (Take Me Away, Sodade (Note: "Sodade" is a misspelling of "saudade", widely used in the Caipira dialect.)) | Tito Neto, Alventino Cavalcanti | 3:31 |
| 3. | "Bomba de estrelas" (Stars Bomb) | Zé Ramalho, Jorge Mautner | 3:40 |
| 4. | "Para um amor no Recife" (For a lover in Recife) | Paulinho da Viola | 3:23 |
| 5. | "Cada um dá o que tem" (Everybody gives what they got) | Zé Ramalho, Chico Guedes | 3:48 |
| 6. | "Não existe molhado como o pranto" (There's Nothing As Wet As a Cry) | Zé Ramalho, Lula Côrtes | 2:50 |
| 7. | "Profetas" (Prophets) | Tavito, Aldir Blanc | 4:54 |
| 8. | "Rap – xote esotérico" (Rap - Esoteric Schottische) | Zé Ramalho | 4:06 |
| 9. | "Os últimos dias" (The Last Days) | Zé Ramalho | 4:11 |
| 10. | "Alforria" (Manumission) | Zé Ramalho | 3:08 |
| 11. | "Um lugar para sonhar" (A Place to Dream) | Zé Ramalho | 3:23 |

== Personnel ==
According to his official website

- Zé Ramalho - Acoustic guitar, Lead vocals
- Manassés - Electric guitar, Twelve-string viola on tracks 1, 3, 10, Viola on tracks 2, 5, 6, 8, 9
- Chico Guedes - Bass guitar on tracks 1, 2, 5, 8, 9
- Jorjão - Bass guitar on tracks 3, 6, 10
- Rui Motta - Drums on track 1
- Gustavo Schröeter - Drums on tracks 2, 5
- Fernando Pereira - Drums on tracks 3, 10
- Sivuca - Arrangement and Conducting on tracks 1, 2, 3, 5, 8, 9, accordion on tracks 6, 8, 10
- Zé Gomes - Percussion on tracks 1, 2, 4, 5, 6 Zabumba on tracks 3, 8, 9, 10
- Zé Leal - Percussion on tracks 1, 2, 3, 5, 6, 8, 9, Pandeiro on track 10
- Marcos Nobile - Piano on tracks 1, 2, 3, 5, 8, 9
- Fernando Moura - Programming on tracks 4, 8, 11
- Julhinho Teixeira - Programming on track 7
