= Brejo do Cruz =

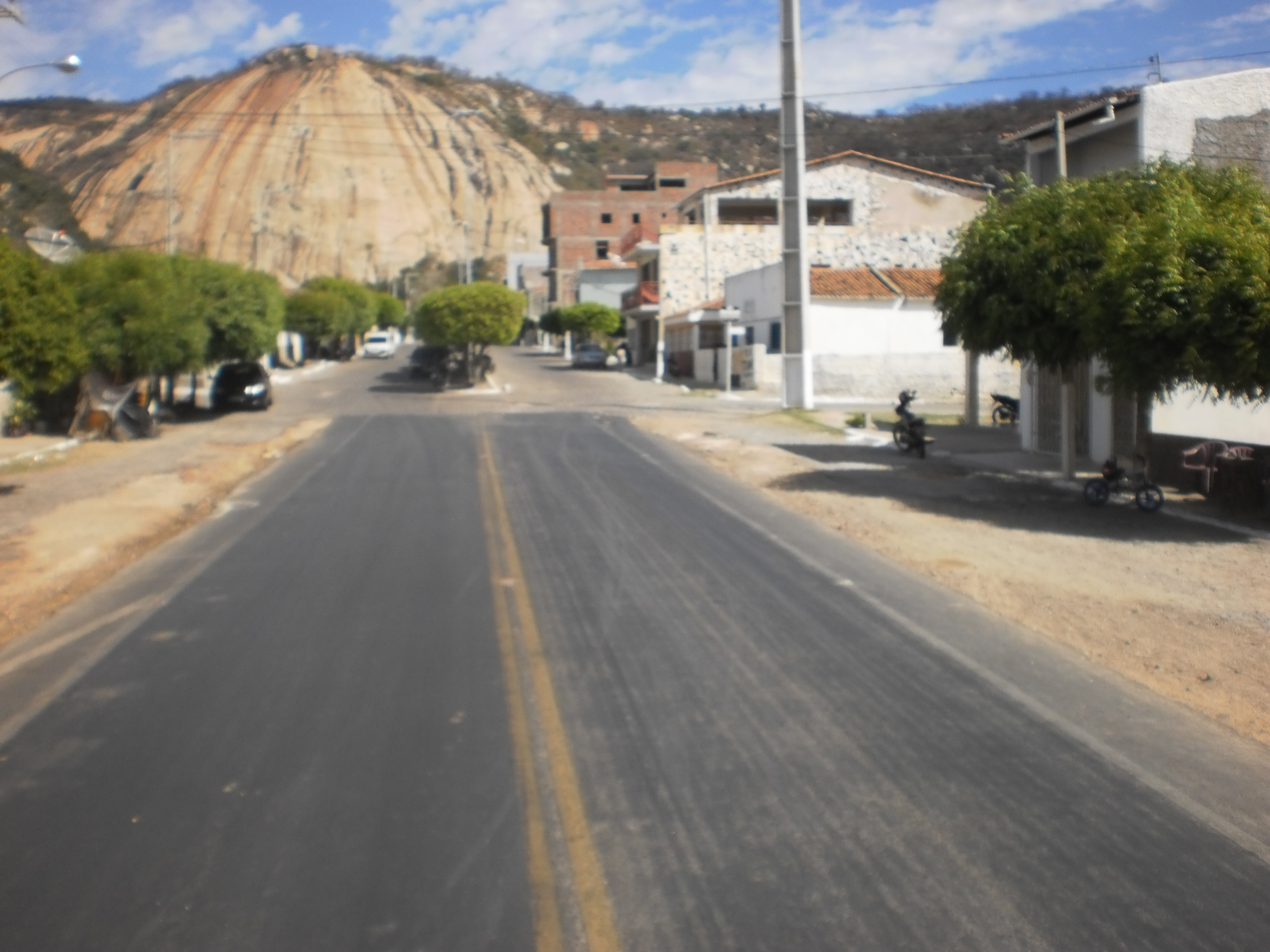

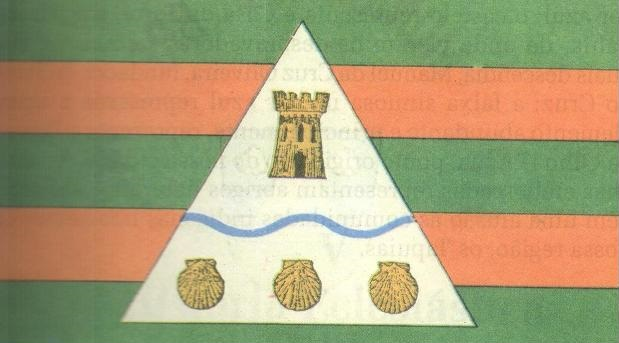
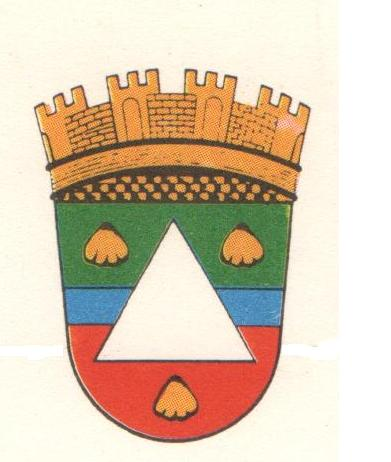
- Flag Coat of arms

- Location in the state of Paraíba and Brazil
- Coordinates: 06°20′56″S 37°29′52″W
- Country: Brazil
- Region: Northeast
- State: Paraíba
- Founded: October 1

Government
  - Mayor: Francisco Dutra Sobrinho

Area
  - Total: 398.917 km^{2} (154.023 sq mi)

Population (2020)
  - Total: 14,206
  - Density: 28.8/km^{2} (75/sq mi)
- Time zone: UTC−3 (BRT)
- Website: Prefeitura Municipal de Brejo do Cruz

Brejo do Cruz is a city located in the sertão of Paraíba, Brazil. The musician Zé Ramalho was born here.
