= Décimas de um Cantador =

Studio album by Zé Ramalho
- Released: 1987
- Recorded: ?
- Genre: MPB
- Length: 34:27
- Label: Epic (CBS - Sony Music)
- Producer: Mauro Motta

Zé Ramalho chronology
Opus Visionário (1986)	Décimas de um Cantador (1987)	Brasil Nordeste (1991)

'Décimas de um Cantador' is the tenth solo album by Brazilian musician Zé Ramalho. It was released in 1987. The back cover features a picture of Ramalho playing the acoustic guitar with a razor; a reference to his cocaine usage at that time.

== Track listing ==
No.	Title	Music	Length
1.	"Acredite quem quiser" (Believe it the Ones who Want to)	Zé Ramalho, Mauro Motta	5:06
2.	"Number 9"	Zé Ramalho	2:11
3.	"Décimas de um cantador" (Tenths of a Singer)	Zé Ramalho, Flavíola	4:25
4.	"Pelos telefones (Hidden track: Lady, Lady, Lady (Bob Dylan))" (Through The Telephones)	Zé Ramalho, Mauro Motta	1:55
5.	"Lua semente" (Seed Moon)	Zé Ramalho, Zé Nêumanne	4:08
6.	"Aldeias da Borborema" (Borborema Villages)	Zé Ramalho, Zé Nêumanne	3:09
7.	"Mary Mar" (Mary Sea)	Zé Ramalho	4:30
8.	"Ser Boy (This boy)" (To Be Boy (This Boy))	Lennon–McCartney, version by Mauro Motta	4:07
9.	"Hino de Duran (Hidden track: Deixa Isso Pra Lá (Forget It) (Alberto Paz and Edson Menezes))" (Duran's Anthem)	Chico Buarque	1:50
10.	"Mulher nova, bonita e carinhosa faz o homem gemer sem sentir dor" (Young, Beautiful and Lovely Woman Makes Men Moan Without Felling Pain)	Zé Ramalho, Otacílio Batista	3:06

== Personnel ==
- Zé Ramalho - Twelve-string guitar, acoustic guitar, lead vocals
- Mauro Motta - Keyboards
- Robson Jorge - Keyboards, acoustic and electric guitars, bass guitar
- Chico Guedes - Bass guitar
- Claudia Olivetti - Choir
- Sônia Bonfá - Choir
- Marisa Fossa - Choir
- Zilma - Choir
- Lincoln Olivetti - Programming
- Ariovaldo - Rhythm
