= Zé Ramalho Canta Raul Seixas =

Studio album by Zé Ramalho
- Released: 2001
- Genre: MPB
- Length: 81:18
- Label: BMG
- Director: Andre Schultz
- Producer: Robertinho de Recife

Zé Ramalho chronology
Nação Nordestina (2000)	Zé Ramalho Canta Raul Seixas (2001)	O Gosto da Criação (2002)

Zé Ramalho Canta Raul Seixas is the sixteenth album by Brazilian solo artist Zé Ramalho. It is a tribute album to another well-known Brazilian guitarist, Raul Seixas. It was released in 2001. Zé wanted to record an album with Raul when he was alive. More than a decade after his death, he decided to record this tribute album, but he faced opposition from the writer Paulo Coelho, who refused to grant permission for Zé Ramalho to record the songs he had composed with Raul. Zé ended up recording only songs Raul had composed alone. Zé later stated, referring to Coelho's refusal: "It was rude, with absolutely no elegance. But there's no way for someone to stop me."

== Track listing ==
1. As aventuras de Raul Seixas na cidade de Thor (The Adventures of Raul Seixas in the city of Thor) – 4:38
2. Metamorfose ambulante (Walking Metamorphosis) – 3:32
3. O trem das 7 (The 07:00 Train) – 3:20
4. Ouro de tolo (Fool's Gold) – 3:33
5. S.O.S – 3:06
6. Dentadura postiça (False Denture) – 3:39
7. How Could I Know – 3:55
8. Prelúdio (Prelude) – 2:16
9. Você ainda pode sonhar (Lucy in the Sky with Diamonds) (You Still Can Dream (Lucy in the Sky with Diamonds)) – 3:54 (Lennon–McCartney, version by Raul Seixas)
10. Planos de papel (Paper Plans) – 3:19
11. Para Raul (To Raul) – 3:28 (Zé Ramalho)

All music by Raul Seixas, except where noted

== Personnel ==
- Zé Ramalho – Lead vocals on all tracks acoustic guitar on all tracks except for 1, Viola on track 1, arrangements on tracks 1, 2, 3, 6, 10, harmonica on track 5, guitar solo on track 11
- Robertinho de Recife – Electric guitar on all tracks except for 10 and 11, Bass guitar on track 1, Arrangement on tracks 2, 3, 4, 5, 6, 7, 9
- André Amorim – Electric guitar on track 11
- Chico Guedes – Bass guitar on track 3
- Igor – Bass on tracks 4, 5, 6, 9, 11
- Eduardo Krieger – Bass on track 7
- Luiz Antônio – Keyboard on all tracks, arrangement on tracks 1, 4, 8, 10, 11
- Renato Massa – Drums on tracks 2, 4, 5, 6, 7, 9, 10, 11
- Gustavo Schröeter – Drums on track 3
- Naif Simões- Percussion on track 1
- Toti Cavalcanti – Saxophone on track 10
- Tadeu Mathias – Choir on tracks 2, 6, 7
- Roberta de Recife – Choir on tracks 2, 6, 7, Lead vocals on track 8
- Jussara Sara – Choir on tracks 2, 6, 7
- Jurema Lourenço – Choir on tracks 2, 6, 7
