= Planeta Água =

Single by Guilherme Arantes
- B-side: "Brasília"
- Released: 1982
- Recorded: 1981
- Genre: MPB
- Length: 5:53
- Label: WEA, Elektra Records
- Songwriter(s): G. Arantes
- Producer(s): Fernando Adour, Liminha

Guilherme Arantes singles chronology
"Deixa Chover" (1981)	"Planeta Água" (1982)	"O Melhor Vai Começar" (1982)

"Planeta Água" is a song written and performed by Guilherme Arantes, a music artist from São Paulo, Brazil, and released in 1982. It was one of the finalists of the Festival MPB Shell 1981, taking second place. It reached the top 10 of Brazilian parades, and it is one of the most remembered songs by the public; the song speaks about the cycles of Earth's oceans and rivers, highlighting the water's healing and destructive powers both.

== Polemic ==
"Planeta Água" was the public's favorite song at the MPB Shell Festival, and expected to take first place, yet the song "Purpurina", sung by Lucinha Lins, was announced as the winner instead, with "Planeta Água" coming in second. Lucinha Lins was booed for several minutes by the entire stadium while she reprised the winning song. Some sources admit that the Shell Oil Company, which sponsored the festival, influenced the results. Guilherme himself has talked about this theory.

== See also ==
- Música popular brasileira
