= Pra Não Dizer que Não Falei de Rock =

Por Aquelas Que Foram Bem Amadas

Studio album by Zé Ramalho
- Released: 1984
- Recorded: ?
- Genre: MPB
- Length: 34:48
- Label: Epic (CBS - Sony Music)
- Producer: Zé Ramalho and Mauro Motta

Zé Ramalho chronology
| Orquídea Negra (1983) | Por Aquelas Que Foram Bem Amadas (1984) | De Gosto de Água e de Amigos (1985) |

Por Aquelas Que Foram Bem Amadas (also Pra Não Dizer Que Não Falei de Rock) is the seventh solo album by Brazilian singer/guitarist Zé Ramalho. It was released in 1984.

In the cover of the album, Ramalho appears without his characteristic beard, lying on the arms of Marelise, daughter of Brazilian film director Zé do Caixão, who had also directed the cover art of Por Aquelas Que Foram Bem Amadas. A boa named Rita also guest appears in the cover. She had worked in films such as Luz del Fuego.

== Track listing ==
| No. | Title | Music | Length |
|---|---|---|---|
| 1. | "Paisagem da flor desesperada" (View of the Desperate Flower) | Ismael Semente | 3:13 |
| 2. | "Dança das luzes" (Dance of the Lights) | Zé Ramalho | 3:00 |
| 3. | "Dogmática" (Dogmatic) | Zé Ramalho | 4:04 |
| 4. | "Mulheres (featuring Wanderléa and Zezé Motta)" (Women) | Zé Ramalho, Macalé | 3:48 |
| 5. | "Dupla fantasia" (Double Fantasy) | Zé Ramalho | 4:27 |
| 6. | "Made in PB" | Zé Ramalho | 3:15 |
| 7. | "Frágil" (Fragile) | Zé Ramalho | 3:35 |
| 8. | "O tolo na colina (The full on the hill)" (The translation is already part of the official name of the song. However, "tolo" translates as "fool", not "full". It is unknown whether the mistake was intentional or not.) | Lennon–McCartney, version by Zé Ramalho and Erasmo Carlos | 3:16 |
| 9. | "Brejo do Cruz" (Cruz's Marsh) | Zé Ramalho | 2:54 |
| 10. | "Jacarepaguá blues" | Zé Ramalho | 3:16 |
