= Zé Ramalho Canta Beatles =

Studio album by Zé Ramalho
- Released: 2011
- Genre: MPB, forró, rock
- Length: 63:34
- Label: Discobertas

Zé Ramalho chronology
Zé Ramalho Canta Jackson do Pandeiro (2010)	Zé Ramalho Canta Beatles (2011)	Sinais dos Tempos (2012)

Zé Ramalho Canta Beatles is the fifth tribute album by Brazilian solo artist Zé Ramalho, and the fourth consecutive one. This time, he pays a tribute to The Beatles, including six tracks from all members' solo careers. The album cover is inspired by the cover of their With the Beatles album.

It is not the first time Ramalho covers The Beatles. Before releasing albums, he made shows in small parties of Paraíba (his state of origin) in which he performed Beatles songs. Later, he also released covers of "The Fool on the Hill" and "This Boy".

== Track listing ==
No.	Title	Music	Length
1.	"Golden Slumbers"	Lennon/McCartney	2:12
2.	"Carry That Weight"	Lennon/McCartney	2:54
3.	"If I Fell"	Lennon/McCartney	3:12
4.	"I Need You"	George Harrison	4:02
5.	"In My Life"	Lennon/McCartney	3:19
6.	"A Day in the Life"	Lennon/McCartney	4:23
7.	"Your Mother Should Know"	Lennon/McCartney	2:41
8.	"Dear Prudence"	Lennon/McCartney	5:19
9.	"While My Guitar Gently Weeps"	Harrison	4:39
10.	"The Long and Winding Road"	Lennon/McCartney	4:09
11.	"Beware of Darkness" (From George Harrison's solo career)	Harrison	3:45
12.	"Isn't It a Pity" (From George Harrison's solo career)	Harrison	5:38
13.	"God" (From John Lennon's solo career)	Lennon	4:20
14.	"Jealous Guy" (From John Lennon's solo career)	Lennon	5:17
15.	"Another Day" (From Paul McCartney's solo career)	McCartney	3:59
16.	"It Don't Come Easy" (From Ringo Starr's solo career)	Starr	3:45
