= Força Verde =

Studio album by Zé Ramalho
- Released: 1982
- Recorded: April 1982
- Genre: MPB
- Length: 45:12; 58:12 (Remastered version)
- Label: Epic (CBS – Sony Music)
- Producer: Zé Ramalho and Mauro Motta

Zé Ramalho chronology
A Terceira Lâmina (1981)	Força Verde (1982)	Orquídea Negra (1983)

Força Verde is the fifth solo album by Brazilian singer/guitarist Zé Ramalho. It was released in 1982.

Ramalho was accused of plagiarism for the opening and title track: its lyrics are a translation of a poem by Irish writer William Butler Yeats but Ramalho apparently copied it from an Incredible Hulk magazine, without knowing or citing the origin of it. It resulted in a lawsuit, and the writer was cited on subsequent albums.

"Beira-Mar – Capítulo II" is the continuation of a trilogy started on "Beira-Mar" (from 1979's A Peleja do Diabo com o Dono do Céu) and finished on "Beira-Mar – Capítulo Final" (from 1998's Eu Sou Todos Nós).

== Track listing ==
1. "Força Verde" (Green Force) – 5:31
2. "Eternas Ondas" (Eternal Waves) – 5:01
3. "O Monte Olímpia" (The Mount Olímpia) – 3:45
4. "Banquete de Signos" (Signs' Banquet) – 6:06
5. "Visões de Zé Limeira Sobre o Final do Século XX" (Visions of Zé Limeira of the End of the 20th Century) – 3:36
6. "Pepitas de Fogo" (Fire gold nuggets) – 5:14
7. "Beira-Mar – Capítulo II" (Near the Sea – Chapter II) – 5:44
8. "Os Segredos de Sumé" (The Secrets of Sumé) – 3:49
9. "Amálgama" (Amalgam) – 4:09
10. "Cristais do Tempo" (Crystals of the Time) – 2:17

=== 2003 Re-Issue ===
1. "Morceguinho (O Rei da Natureza)" (Little Bat (The King of Nature)) – 2:17
2. "São Sebastião do Rodeio" (Saint Sebastian of the Rodeio) – 3:40
3. "Frevo Mulher" (Woman Frevo) – 3:38
4. "Rapaz do táxi" (Taxi Guy) – 3:37

All music by Zé Ramalho.
