= Raimundo Fagner =

Brazilian musician and singer

Fagner
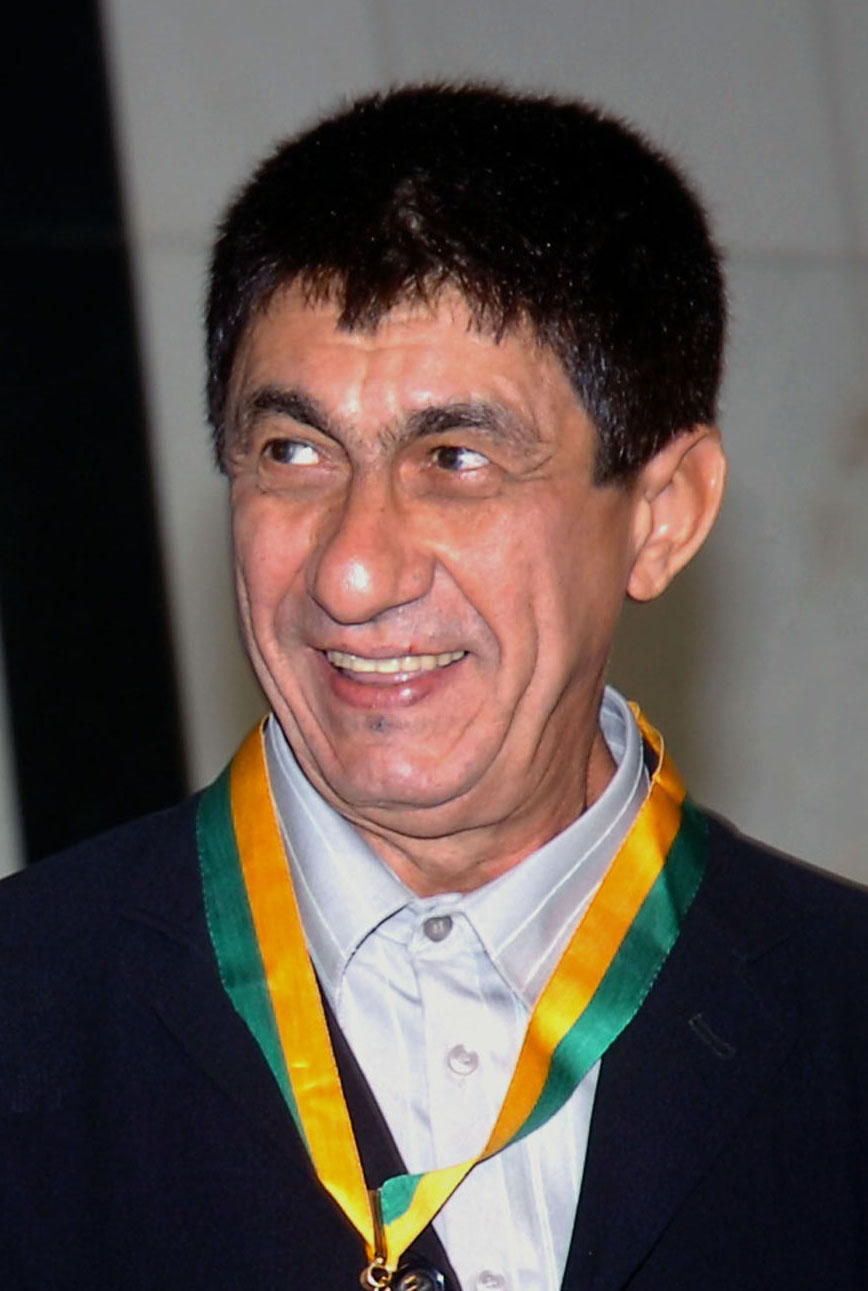

Background information
- Born: Raimundo Fagner Cândido Lopes; 13 October 1949 (age 76); Orós, Ceará, Brazil
- Genres: MPB
- Occupations: Singer, musician, composer, producer, actor
- Years active: 1968-present

Raimundo Fagner Cândido Lopes (born in Orós, Ceará, October 13, 1949) is a Brazilian singer, composer, musician, actor and music producer. He is commonly known by the stage name of Fagner.

== Biography ==
The youngest of the five children of José Fares, a Lebanese immigrant from Ain Ebel and Dona Francisca, Fagner was born in Fortaleza, the capital of the state of Ceará, although his birth was recorded in Orós.

At the age of five, he won a youth competition at a local radio station. As a teen, he formed vocal and instrumental groups and began to compose his own music. In 1968, he won the Popular Music Festival of Ceará with his song "Nada Sou".

== Career ==
In 1971 he moved to Brasília, taking first place in the Popular Music Festival of the University Studies Center of Brasília with his song "Mucuripe" (with collaborator Belchior), and became Fagner's first notable success as a composer. He won prizes in other categories with additional songs as well.

In 1971, he recorded his first single compact in partnership with another musician from Ceará, Wilson Cirino. It was released on the label RGE, but was not a huge success. The goal was to beat the record success of singers like Antônio Carlos & Jocáfi. In the same year, he went to Rio de Janeiro, where Elis Regina recorded his song, "Mucuripe." This became Fagner's first success as a songwriter and singer. That year, he went on to record the same song on a 7", with Caetano Veloso singing "A volta da Asa Branca." Veloso, being the intellectual type, always distanced himself from what is considered pop music and Fagner already represented a type of Brazilian music rooted much more in pop music.

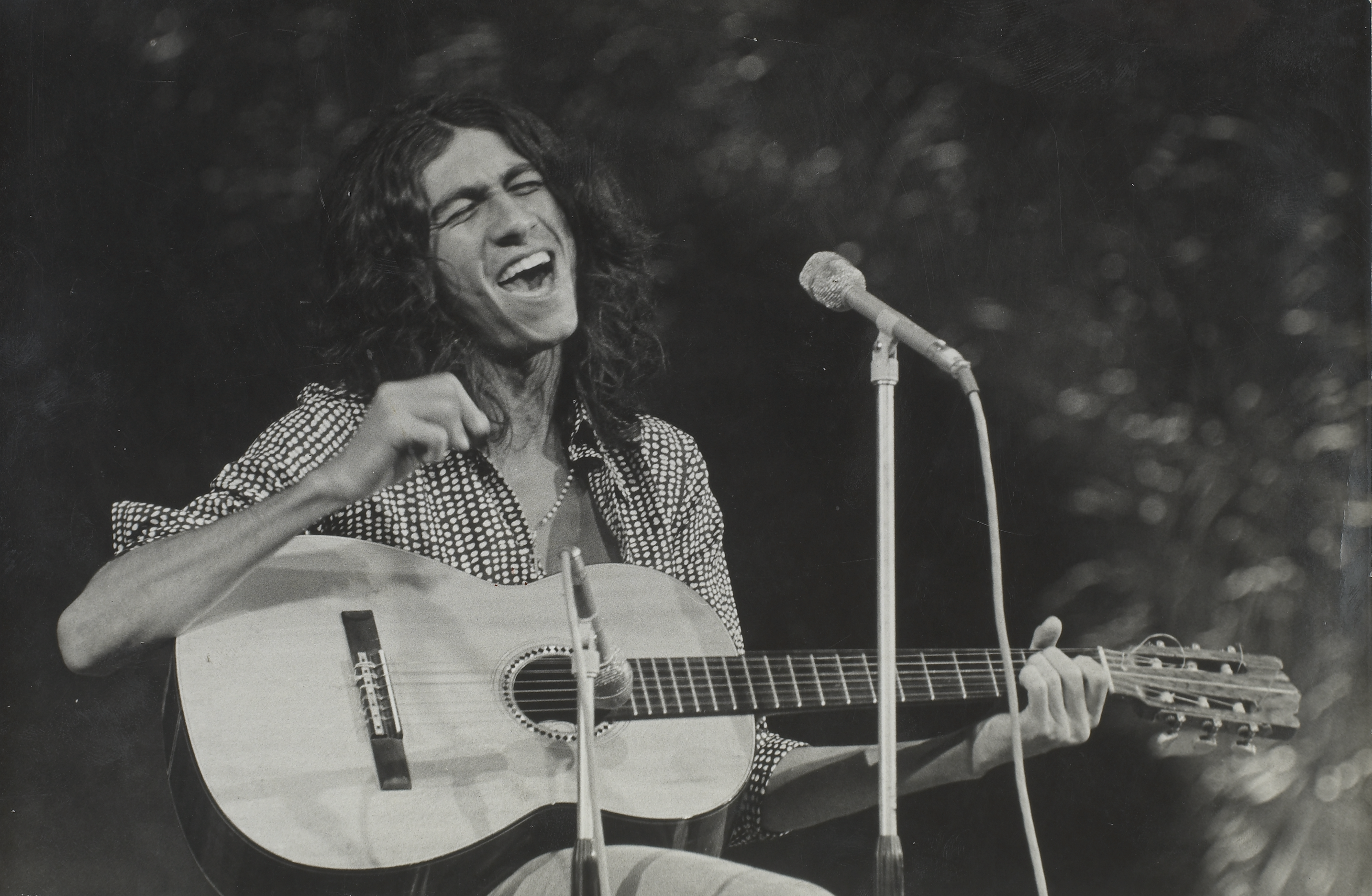
Fagner, 1973.

Other works, like his fourth album, Orós, released in 1977 with arrangements and musical direction by Hermeto Pascoal, show a more unconventional approach, one less concerned with commercial success. In 1978, he released the album Eu Canto. Despite crediting the late poet Cecília Meireles for the lyrics on the track "Motivo," Fagner still faced legal trouble with her heirs, and the album had to be reissued with "Quem me levará sou eu" instead. His sixth album, Beleza was released in 1979. Fagner was considered by the readers of Playboy magazine to be the best singer in the year of 1979, while Roberto Carlos (named the King of Brazilian music) was in second place.

In the 1980s, Fagner kept to his northeastern roots, and was divided at the same time with romanticism. His first LP of the 1980s was Eternas Ondas. This record included an interpretation, with the help of Frederick Mendes, of the classic John Lennon and Yoko Ono song "Oh My Love" from the album Imagine. Taking advantage of his popularity, Continental released the album Juntos, featuring Belchior, a compilation containing tracks from the album Ave Noturna, his only work released by Continental. Polydor, in turn, reissued Manera Fru Fru Manera. In 1981, he recorded the album Traduz-se which was a major milestone in his career, The disc was released throughout Europe and Latin America, sold over 250,000 copies in a short time, and was certified platinum.

He has had a distinguished career as a performer, singer, songwriter and composer for over three decades, and is also known for his collaborations with other MPB artists such as Caetano Veloso, Roberta Miranda, Chico Buarque, and others.

In 2003 Fagner was sued for alleged plagiarism: his song "As Penas do Tiê" appeared to have the same melody and lyrics as a song of one of earlier Brazilian composer Hekel Tavares. In recent times, he has been considered one of the greatest composers of the Spanish language, an accomplishment achieved by several Brazilian singers, through his affiliations with non-Latin musicians such as Argentina's Mercedes Sosa.

In November 2014, Fagner released a collaborative live album with singer and acoustic guitarist Zé Ramalho, entitled Fagner & Zé Ramalho ao Vivo.

== Discography ==
=== Albums ===
- 1973 - Manera Fru Fru, Manera
- 1975 - Ave Noturna
- 1976 - Raimundo Fagner
- 1977 - Orós (featuring Hermeto Pascoal)
- 1978 - Eu Canto - Quem Viver Chorará
- 1979 - Beleza
- 1980 - Eternas Ondas
- 1981 - Traduzir-se
- 1982 - Sorriso Novo - Qualquer Música
- 1983 - Palavra de Amor
- 1984 - A Mesma Pessoa - Cartaz
- 1985 - Fagner - Semente
- 1986 - Fagner - Lua do Leblon
- 1987 - Romance no Deserto
- 1989 - O Quinze
- 1991 - Pedras que Cantam
- 1993 - Demais
- 1994 - Caboclo Sonhador
- 1995 - Retrato
- 1996 - Raimundo Fagner - Pecado Verde
- 1997 - Terral
- 2001 - Fagner
- 2004 - Donos do Brasil
- 2007 - Fortaleza
- 2009 - Uma Canção no Rádio
- 2020 - Serenata
- 2021 - Festa (featuring Elba Ramalho)
- 2024 - Além Desse Futuro

=== Others ===
- 1981 - Raimundo Fagner Canta en Español
- 1984 - Fagner - Dez Anos
- 1986 - Poets in New York (Poetas en Nueva York) (contributor, Federico García Lorca tribute album)
- 1991 - Fagner en Español
- 1993 - Uma Noite Demais - Ao Vivo no Japão
- 1998 - Amigos e Canções
- 2000 - Ao Vivo
- 2002 - Me Leve (ao vivo)
- 2003 - Fagner & Zeca Baleiro
- 2014 - Fagner & Zé Ramalho ao Vivo
