= Zé Ramalho =

Brazilian composer and performer (born 1949)

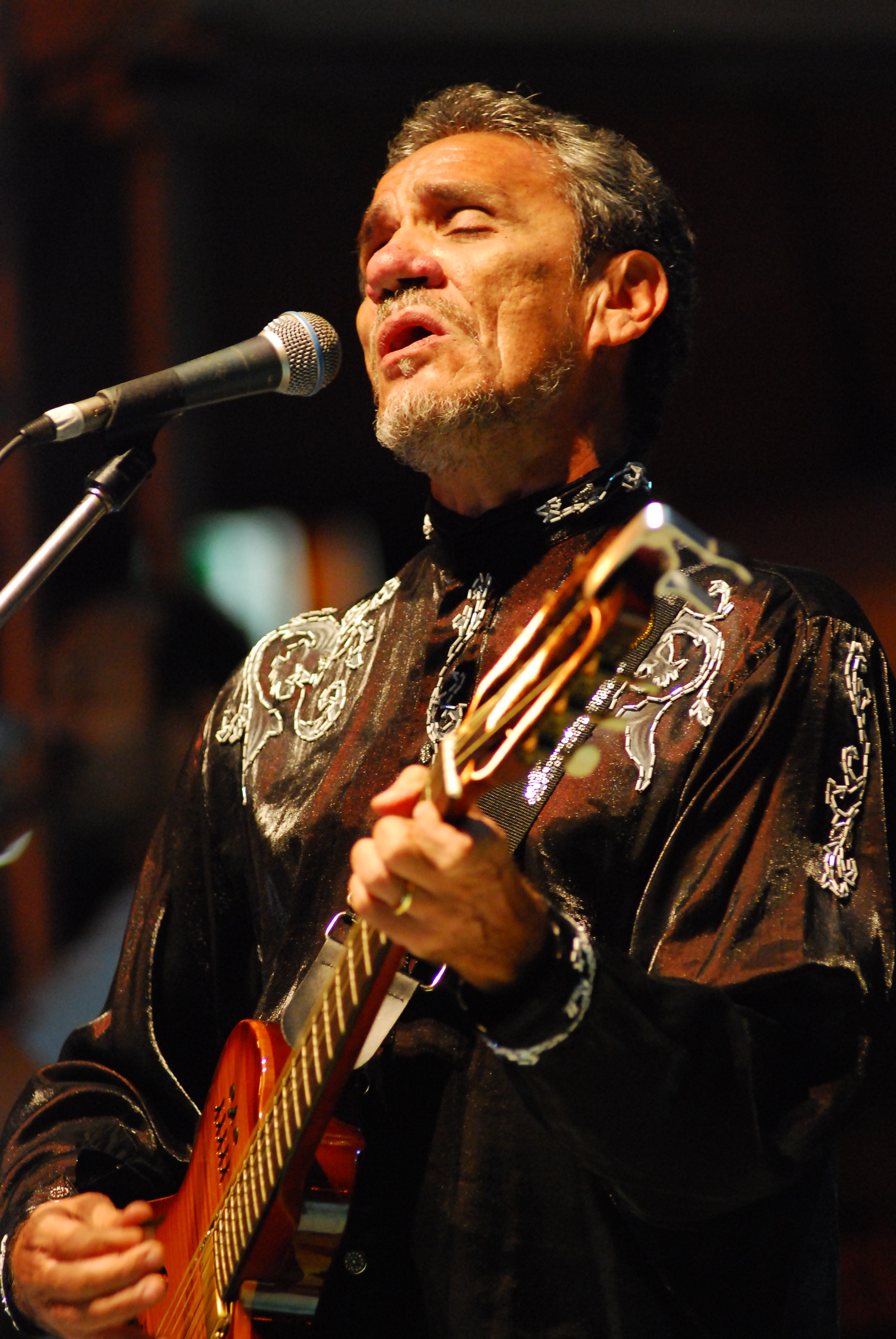
- Zé Ramalho performing live at the 2008 Virada Cultural in São Paulo, Brazil.

Background information
- Born: José Ramalho Neto; October 3, 1949 (age 77)
- Origin: Brejo do Cruz, Paraíba, Brazil
- Genres: MPB; adult contemporary; pop
- Occupations: Singer; songwriter; guitarist
- Instruments: Vocals; acoustic guitar; electric guitar; harmonica; viola
- Years active: 1975–present
- Labels: Epic; CBS; Sony; Walt Disney; BMG; RCA; EMI; Universal

Zé Ramalho (Portuguese pronunciation: [ˈzɛ ʁaˈmaʎu]; born José Ramalho Neto on October 3, 1949 – Brejo do Cruz, Paraíba, Brazil) is a Brazilian composer and performer. Zé Ramalho has collaborated with various major Brazilian musicians, including Vanusa, Geraldo Azevedo and Alceu Valença.

As with many musicians back in his younger days, he was first influenced by rock and roll; however, at the age of 20, his music took a more traditional Northeastern Brazilian approach. Zé Ramalho's lyrics however, are very influenced by the socio-economic difficulties faced by the average Brazilian.

Zé Ramalho is the first cousin of Elba Ramalho, a Brazilian composer and performer.

== Biography ==
=== Early life: 1949–1974 ===
Zé Ramalho was born to Estelita Torres Ramalho, an elementary school teacher, and Antônio de Pádua Pordeus Ramalho, a Seresta performer. When he was two years old, his father drowned in a reservoir of the sertão, and he was then adopted by his grandfather. His love for his grandfather would later be expressed in the song "Avôhai". After spending most of his childhood in Campina Grande, his family moved to João Pessoa. Ramalho went to medicine school at the Federal University of Paraíba.

As soon as the family settled in João Pessoa, he took part of some Jovem Guarda performances, being influenced by Renato Barros, Leno e Lílian, Roberto Carlos & Erasmo Carlos, Golden Boys, The Rolling Stones, Pink Floyd and Bob Dylan.

In 1974, his first son, Christian, was born.

Before composing, he used to write Cordel literature.

=== First works: 1974–1975 ===
Also in 1974, he performed for Tânia Quaresma's movie Nordeste: Cordel, Repente e Canção soundtrack. At that time, he figured out a way to mix all the influences he received throughout his life: from Rock 'n' Roll to Forró. A year later, he recorded his first album, Paêbirú along with Lula Côrtes through the label Rozenblit (label). Today the copies from this very rare vinyl are highly priced in the international collector's market.

=== Beginning of the major musical career:1975–1984 ===
In 1976, he left medicine school and moved to Rio de Janeiro, where he searched for a record label to release his first album. After being rejected by several producers and executives, he was finally accepted by Jairo Pires, from CBS. In 1977, he recorded his second album (first solo), the self-titled Zé Ramalho. A year later, his second son, Wilson, was born. In 1979, the third son, João (born to him and to his wife Amelinha), came along the third album, A Peleja do Diabo com o Dono do Céu (also referred to as Zé Ramalho II). He then moved to Fortaleza in 1980, where he wrote and published his book "Carne de Pescoço" ("Neck Flesh"). The fourth album, A Terceira Lâmina, was released afterwards, and the fifth one, Força Verde, in 1982.

In 1983, he broke up with Amelinha. After releasing his sixth album, Orquídea Negra, he got married with Roberta, Amelinha's cousin, in 1984.

=== Small declining: 1985–1990 ===
The mid eighties would witness a small decrease in Zé Ramalho's popularity, with the releases of the albums Pra Não Dizer Que Não Falei de Rock (or Por Aquelas Que Foram Bem Amadas) (1984), De Gosto de Água e de Amigos (1985), Opus Visionário (1986) and Décimas de um Cantador (1987). In 1990, he performed in the United States for a Brazilian audience.

=== Back to the top: 1991–2001 ===
In 1991, his only sister, Goretti, died. Even though, he was able to record his eleventh album, Brasil Nordeste, and returned to his success times with the recording of the song "Entre a Serpente e a Estrela" for the soapopera "Pedra Sobre Pedra". In 1992, his fifth son, José, was born, and he released the twelfth album Frevoador. In 1995, he had his first daughter born: Linda.

In 1996, he recorded the album O Grande Encontro live with his cousin Elba Ramalho (who had already re-recorded a very successful version of his song "Chão de Giz") and the well known MPB names Alceu Valença and Geraldo Azevedo. In the same year, he released his thirteenth album Cidades e Lendas. The success of "O Grande Encontro" was so great that he decided to record it again in 1997 at the studio, this time without Alceu Valença though. The record sold 300,000+ copies, going Gold and Platinum. To celebrate his 20 years of career, he released the CD 20 Anos – Antologia Acústica. The record label Sony Music also released a box set containing three discs: one of rarities, one of duets and one of classics. Also to celebrate the 20 years, Brazilian author Luciane Alves released a book titled "Zé Ramalho – um Visionário do século XX" ("Zé Ramalho – a 20th Century Visionary").

Before the end of the millennium, another great hit: Admirável Gado Novo (first released in his second album in 1980) was the opening theme of the soap opera O Rei do Gado. He also released his fourteenth studio album, Eu Sou Todos Nós, and the sixteenth one, Nação Nordestina, in which he once again explored the music of his home land, the Nordeste. The album would later be a candidate for the Latin Grammy Award for Best Regional Music Album or of Brazilian Origins.

=== Continuing into the 3rd Millennium: 2001–2011 ===
His first work of the 21st Century was the release of Zé Ramalho canta Raul Seixas, a cover album with songs by Raul Seixas. He then shared stage with Elba Ramalho in the Rock in Rio 3. In 2002, Som Livre releases a CD of his greatest hits, part of its "Perfil" series of Greatest Hits albums. Also in 2002, he released his seventeenth album, O Gosto da Criação.

In 2003, he released his eighteenth album, Estação Brasil, containing 19 recordings of his main Brazilian influences, and one new song. He guest appeared in the song Sinônimos ("Synonyms"), from Chitãozinho & Xororó's album, Aqui o Sistema é Bruto ("Here, the system is Brutal").

In 2005, he recorded his only live album, simply titled Zé Ramalho ao vivo. His latter album, Parceria dos Viajantes, was recorded in 2007 and was nominated for the Latin Grammy Award for Best Brazilian Popular Music Album.

In 2008, he released a compilation of rarities called Zé Ramalho da Paraíba, followed by another cover album: Zé Ramalho canta Bob Dylan - Tá tudo mudando, a tribute to the American musician.

In 2009, a third cover album, Zé Ramalho Canta Luiz Gonzaga, was released, paying tribute to the Brazilian musician. In 2010 and 2011, respectively, he released two more tribute albums: Zé Ramalho Canta Jackson do Pandeiro, in tribute to Jackson do Pandeiro, and Zé Ramalho Canta Beatles, in tribute to the Beatles.

=== Own record label: 2012–present ===
In 2012, Zé Ramalho created his own record label, Avôhai Music, through which he is releasing his first non-cover studio album since 2007: Sinais dos Tempos. In September 2013, Zé Ramalho performed at Rock in Rio with Brazilian thrash metal band Sepultura – the line-up was labeled as "Zépultura", a portmanteau of both artists' names.

In November 2014, Zé Ramalho released a collaborative live album with singer and acoustic guitarist Fagner, entitled Fagner & Zé Ramalho ao Vivo.

== Discography ==
=== Studio albums ===
- 1975 – Paêbirú (with Lula Côrtes)
- 1978 – Zé Ramalho
- 1979 – A Peleja do Diabo com o Dono do Céu
- 1981 – A Terceira Lâmina
- 1982 – A Força Verde
- 1983 – Orquídea Negra
- 1984 – Por Aquelas Que Foram Bem Amadas or Pra Não Dizer Que Não Falei de Rock
- 1985 – De Gosto de Água e de Amigos
- 1986 – Opus Visionário
- 1987 – Décimas de um Cantador
- 1992 – Frevoador
- 1996 – Cidades e Lendas
- 1997 – Antologia Acústica (Acoustic versions album – Gold, 9× Platinum)
- 1998 – Eu Sou Todos Nós (Gold)
- 2000 – Nação Nordestina
- 2001 – Zé Ramalho Canta Raul Seixas (Raul Seixas cover songs – Gold)
- 2002 – O Gosto da Criação
- 2007 – Parceria dos Viajantes
- 2008 – Zé Ramalho Canta Bob Dylan – Tá Tudo Mudando" (Bob Dylan cover songs)
- 2009 – Zé Ramalho Canta Luiz Gonzaga (Luiz Gonzaga cover songs)
- 2010 – Zé Ramalho Canta Jackson do Pandeiro (Jackson do Pandeiro cover songs)
- 2011 – Zé Ramalho Canta Beatles (The Beatles cover songs)
- 2012 – Sinais dos Tempos

=== Live albums ===
- 2005 – Zé Ramalho ao Vivo
- 2014 – Fagner & Zé Ramalho ao Vivo

=== Compilations ===
- 1991 – Brasil Nordeste
- 2002 – Perfil (2× Gold)
- 2003 – Estação Brasil
- 2008 – Zé Ramalho da Paraíba
- 2016 – Zé Ramalho voz e violão 40 anos de música

=== Guest appearances ===
- Lordose pra leão – os pássaros não calçam rua
- Jorge Cabeleira – Jorge Cabeleira e o dia em que seremos todos inúteis
- Roberta de Recife – Nordestina
- Ricardo Vilas e amigos – Bem Brasil
- Waldonys – aprendi com o Rei vol.2
- Renato e seus Blue Caps – Renato e seus Blue Caps (1981)
- João do Vale – João do Vale (1981)
- Segredo de Estado – Segredo de Estado (1992)
- Glorinha Gadelha – tudo que ilumina (1993)
- Dorival Caymmi – Songbook Dorival Caymmi vol. 4 (1993)
- João Batista do Vale – João Batista do Vale (1994)
- Various Artists – Viva Gonzagão! É forró, é xote, é baião (1994 tribute to Gonzaguinha)
- Jorge Mautner – Bomba de estrelas (1995 tribute album to Jorge Mautner)
- Zé Ramalho, Geraldo Azevedo, Alceu Valença and Elba Ramalho – O grande encontro (1996) (5× Platinum)
- Xuxa – Arraiá da Xuxa (1997)
- Dominguinhos & Various Artists – Dominguinhos e convidados cantam Luiz Gonzaga (1997)
- Falcão – A Um Passo da MPB (1997)
- Boca Livre – Boca Livre, 20 anos - convida (1997)
- André Luiz Oliveira – Mensagem de Fernando Pessoa (1997)
- Zé Ramalho, Geraldo Azevedo and Elba Ramalho – O grande encontro 2 (1997) (Gold)
- Various Artists – Casa do forró - ao vivo (1998)
- Geraldo Azevedo – Raízes e Frutos (1998)
- Fagner – Amigos e Canções (1998)
- Alcymar Monteiro – Festa Brasileira (1999)
- Elba Ramalho – Solar (1999)
- Zeca Baleiro – Vô imbolá (1999)
- Marinês – Marinês & sua gente - 50 anos de forró (1999)
- Various Artists – Jackson do Pandeiro - revisto e sampleado (1999 tribute album to Jackson do Pandeiro)
- Various Artists – O submarino verde e amarelo (2000)
- Various Artists – Reiginaldo Rossi - um tributo (2000 tribute to Reiginaldo Rossi)
- Various Artists – O melhor do forró no maior São João do mundo (2000)
- Zé Ramalho, Elba Ramalho, Geraldo Azevedo – O grande encontro 3 - ao vivo (Gold)
- Various Artists – Forró Força Livre - vol 3 (2001)
- Various Artists – John Lennon - uma homenagem (2001 tribute album to John Lennon
- Gonzaguinha & Various Artists – Duetos com Mestre Lua (2001)
- Rastapé – Até o Dia Clarear (2002)
- Various Artists – Forró da feira 2 (2002)
- Various Artists – Lisbela e o Prisioneiro (2003)
- Jota Quest – Oxigênio (2003)
- Paulo Cesar Barros & Various Artists – Estrada (2004)
- Various Artists – Um barzinho, um violão - ao vivo (2004)
- Chitãozinho & Xororó – Aqui o Sistema é Bruto (2004)
- Léo e Bia – Léo e Bia 1973 - edição especial (2005)
- Beto Brito – Imbolê (2007)
- Os Paralamas do Sucesso – Brasil Afora (2009)
- Andreas Kisser – Hubris I & II (2009)
