= Guilherme Arantes =

Brazilian singer-songwriter and pianist

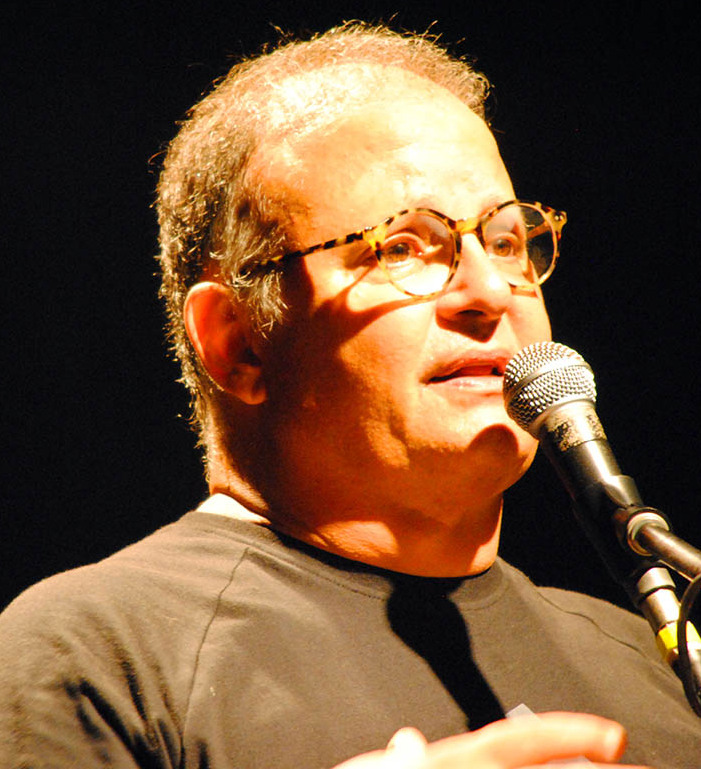

Background information
- Born: 28 July 1953 (age 73)
- Origin: São Paulo, Brazil
- Genres: Rock, pop, new wave, synth-pop, adult contemporary, MPB, folk rock, pop rock, soft rock, classical, progressive pop, progressive rock (early career)
- Occupations: Singer-songwriter, musician
- Instruments: Vocals, piano/keyboards
- Years active: 1969–present
- Labels: CBS Records International, Coaxo do Sapo, Columbia Records, Elektra Records, EMI, Epic Records, Mercury Records, PlayArte Music, Polydor Records, PolyGram, SIGLA, Som Livre, Sony Music, Universal Music Group, Verde Vertente, Virgin Music, Virgin Music Group, Warner Bros. Records, Warner Music Group
- Spouse: Márcia Miguez Gonzalez Arantes
- Website: www.guilhermearantes.com

Guilherme Arantes (Portuguese pronunciation: [ɡiˈʎɛʁmi aˈɾɐ̃tʃis]) is a Brazilian singer-songwriter and pianist. He is a Steinway Artist.

As a teenager, he was a member of the band "Polissonante", which also featured Brazilian actor Kadu Moliterno on bass guitar. In 1969, Arantes started the band Moto Perpétuo with fellow students from USP's architecture course.

It was with Moto Perpétuo that Arantes got his first taste of touring and recording in a studio. The band split up in 1974 as Arantes wanted to pursue a more personal, emotional pop style of music.

Arantes dropped out of university to dedicate himself to his solo career, and in 1976, his song "Meu Mundo e Nada Mais" (My world and nothing more) was picked by Rede Globo to feature in the soundtrack for the telenovela Anjo Mau. The song was a hit, and Arantes toured the country for the first time.

His first self-titled album was released the same year on Globo's Som Livre label. The song "Cuide-se Bem" (Take good care) from the same record, was also picked by Globo for another telenovela, Duas Vidas. Arantes went on to write another 23 songs for Globo's telenovelas, with most of them becoming radio hits. Besides his solo work, he has also written songs for artists such as Gang 90 & Absurdettes, Elis Regina, Marina Lima, Roberto Carlos, Gal Costa, Caetano Veloso, Emilio Santiago, Simone, Ceu, Nando Reis, Alaide Costa, and Maria Bethânia. His album "Condição Humana" was elected the best of 2014 Premio Multishow, best of 2010 Decade in the RedBull list. His album Flores & Cores (Flowers & Colors) was elected the 13th best Brazilian album of 2017 by the Brazilian edition of Rolling Stone. In 2021, the album A Desordem dos Templários was released amid the emergence of the COVID-19 pandemic. Since then, Guilherme has been living in the medieval city of Ávila, Spain. On January 15th, 2026, he released the album Interdimensional, and a major tour is set to mark the 50th anniversary of his career.

== Discography ==
- Moto Perpétuo (1974) as a member of Moto Perpétuo.
- Guilherme Arantes (1976)
- Ronda Noturna (1977)
- A Cara e a Coragem (1978)
- Guilherme Arantes (1979)
- Coração Paulista (1980)
- Guilherme Arantes (1982)
- Ligação (1983)
- Despertar (1985)
- Calor (1986)
- Guilherme Arantes (1987)
- Romances Modernos (1989)
- Pão (1990)
- Meu Mundo e Tudo Mais (1990)
- Crescente (1992), Castelos (1993)
- Clássicos (1994)
- Outras Cores (1996)
- Maioridade (1997)
- Guilherme Arantes (1999)
- New Classical Piano Solos (2000)
- Guilherme Arantes – Ao Vivo (2001)
- Aprendiz (2003)
- Lótus (2007)
- Piano Solos (2011)
- Condição Humana (2013)
- Flores & Cores (2017)
- A Desordem dos Templários (2021)
- Interdimensional (2026)
