= Jackson do Pandeiro =

Brazilian percussionist and singer

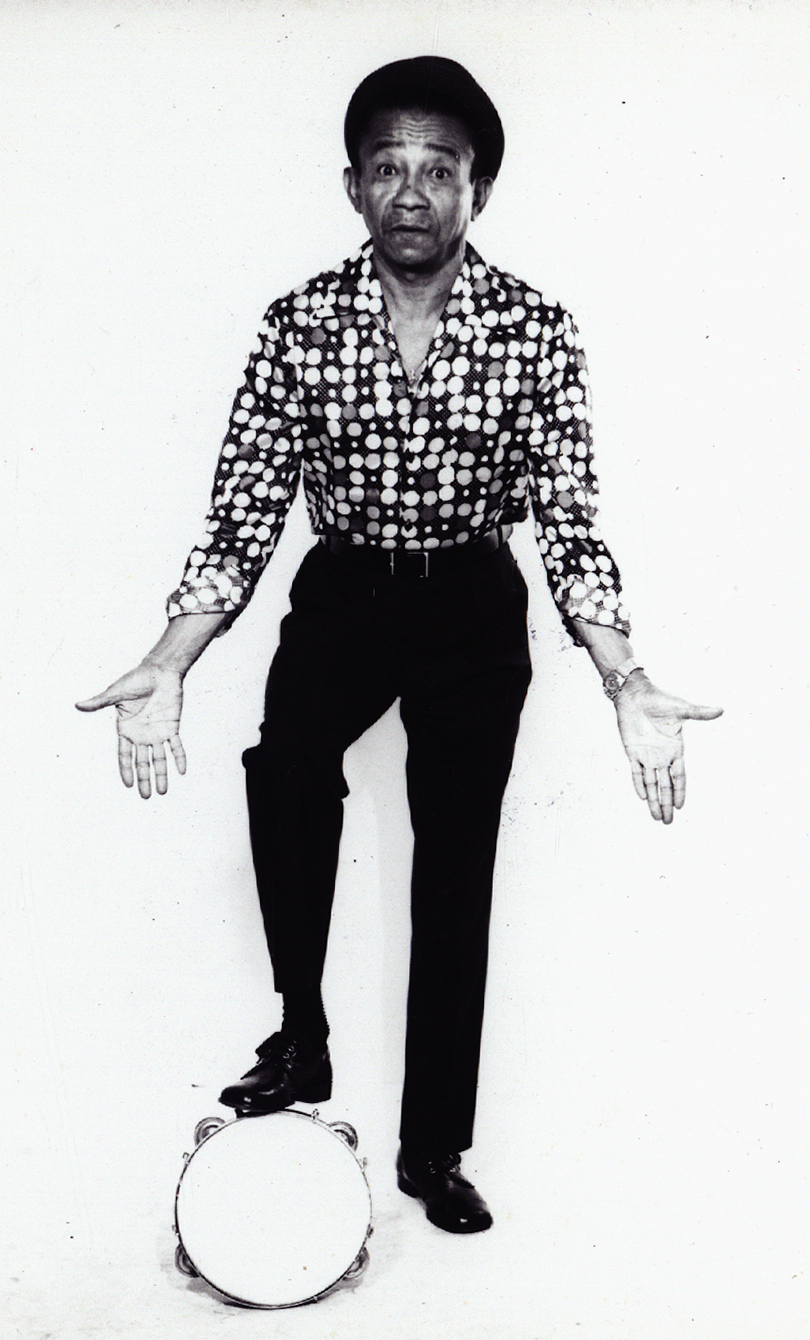
- Jackson do Pandeiro, source: Public domain / Arquivo Nacional Collection

Background information
- Also known as: Jackson do Pandeiro
- Born: José Gomes Filho; August 31, 1919; Alagoa Grande, Paraíba, Brazil
- Died: July 10, 1982 (aged 62) Brasília, Federal District, Brazil
- Occupations: Percussionist, singer
- Instruments: Pandeiro, voice
- Years active: 1950s–1980s

José Gomes Filho (August 31, 1919 – July 10, 1982), more commonly known as Jackson do Pandeiro (Portuguese pronunciation: [ˈʒaksõ du pɐ̃ˈdejɾu]), was a Brazilian percussionist and singer. He is described by Allmusic as a key promotor of Northeastern Brazilian music (along with Luiz Gonzaga) and one of the most inventive and influential Brazilian musicians, though much of his recognition was posthumous.

== Biography ==
Jackson was born in Paraíba, Brazil, a region in the northeast of the country. His mother, Flora Mourão, was a musician and singer who played several percussion instruments. As a child he had originally wanted to play the accordion, but his parents could not afford it and bought him a pandeiro, a type of tambourine, in its place. He began playing music with the zabumba, however, to assist his mother in performances. When Jackson was 13 years old his family moved to Campina Grande, a city in Paraíba. After the move, Jackson lived in João Pessoa, where he performed in various cabarets and on the radio; and also to Recife, where he eventually began working in a radio station and took the pseudonym of Jackson do Pandeiro. Originally his mother had nicknamed him "Jack", after the actor Jack Perry, who played parts in cowboy films which were popular in Brazil during Jackson's youth. He had his first hit with "Sebastiana", a song based on traditional Brazilian rhythms.

The single was followed by a number of albums that were successful with audiences throughout Brazil. Soon after, he joined his future wife Almira Castilhos de Albuquerque on a trip to Rio de Janeiro, financed by his recent success. The two had been performing in a duo together and were eventually married in October 1954. However, the duo and marriage were jointly ended in 1967, and Jackson's popularity diminished soon after. Jackson did find some greater success later, though, when the popular singer and guitarist Gilberto Gil, as well as the singer Gal Costa, rerecorded some of his material in 1972.

== Discography ==
- 1955: Jackson do Pandeiro
- 1956: Forró do Jackson
- 1957: Jackson e Almira – Os Donos do Ritmo
- 1958: Forró do Jackson
- 1959: Jackson do Pandeiro
- 1960: Sua Majestade – o Rei do Ritmo
- 1960: Cantando de Norte a Sul
- 1961: Ritmo, Melodia e a Personalidade de Jackson do Pandeiro
- 1961: Mais Ritmo
- 1962: A Alegria da Casa
- 1962: ...É Batucada!
- 1963: Forró do Zé Lagoa
- 1964: Tem Jabaculê
- 1964: Coisas Nossas
- 1965: ...E Vamos Nós!
- 1966: O Cabra da Peste
- 1967: A Braza do Norte
- 1970: Aqui Tô Eu
- 1971: O Dono do Forró
- 1972: Sina de Cigarra
- 1973: Tem Mulher, Tô Lá
- 1974: Nossas Raízes
- 1975: A Tuba da Muié
- 1976: É Sucesso
- 1977: Um Nordestino Alegre
- 1978: Alegria Minha Gente
- 1980: São João Autêntico de Jackson do Pandeiro
- 1981: Isso é que é Forró!
