= Elba Ramalho =

Brazilian singer (born 1951)

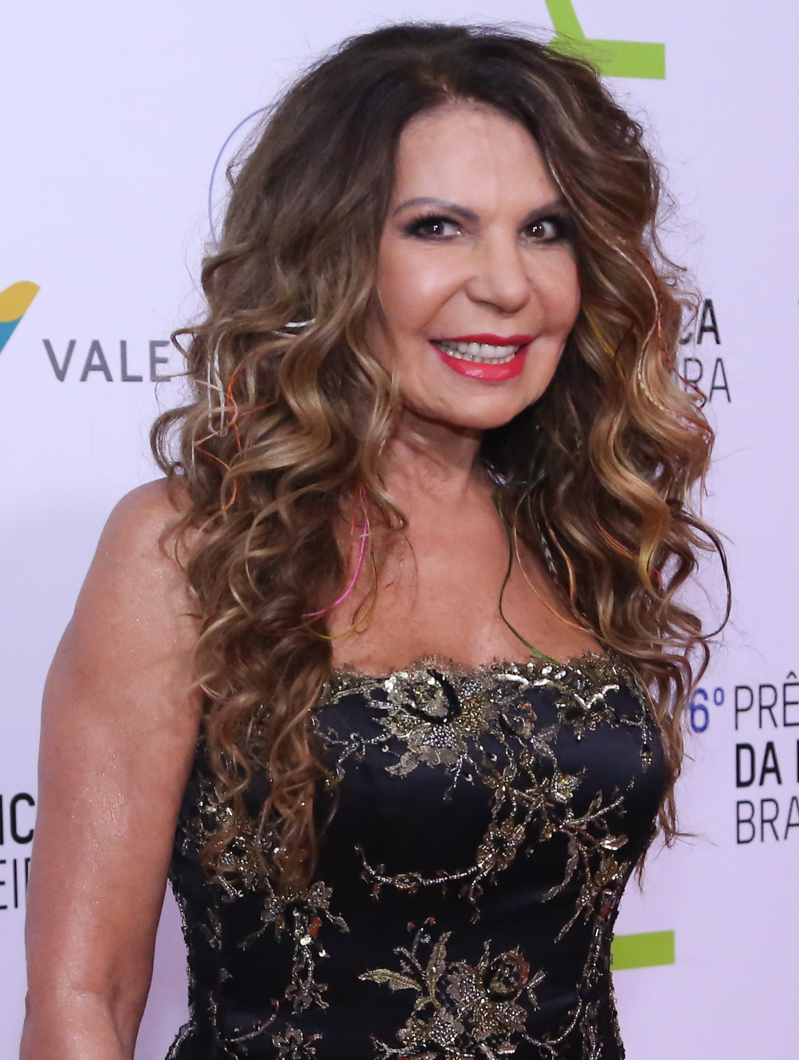
- Ramalho in 2015

Background information
- Born: August 17, 1951 (age 75); Conceição, Paraíba, Brazil
- Genres: MPB, salsa, forró
- Occupations: Singer-songwriter, actress
- Instruments: Vocals, guitar

Elba Ramalho (Brazilian Portuguese: [ˈɛwbɐ ʁaˈmaʎu]; born August 17, 1951) is a Brazilian singer and songwriter. Nineteen-times Brazilian Music Awards winner, she is sometimes called "The Queen of Forró".

In addition to her successful solo career, Elba has collaborated with a number of well-established Brazilian acts, including Alceu Valença and her first cousin, Zé Ramalho.

In 2019, her album O Ouro do Pó da Estrada was nominated for the Latin Grammy Award for Best Portuguese Language Roots Album. On 2021, she received another nomination for the same category, this time for the album Eu e Vocês.

== Discography ==
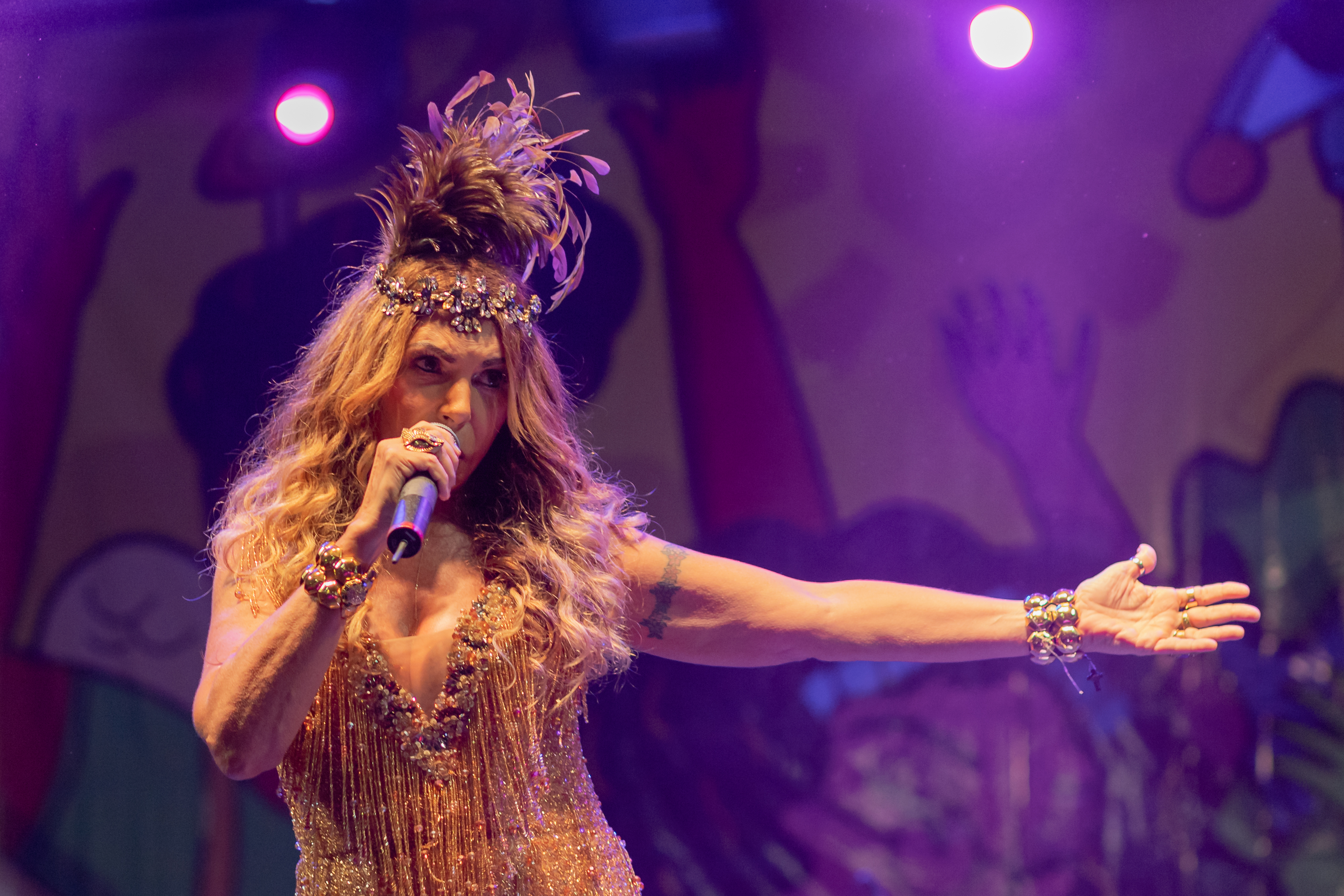
Ramalho performing in 2019

| Year | Album | Record company | Format | Sales in Brazil | Certifications |
|---|---|---|---|---|---|
| 1979 | Ave de Prata | Epic/CBS | LP | 70,000 | — |
| 1980 | Capim do Vale | Epic/CBS | LP | 80,000 | — |
| 1981 | Elba | CBS | LP | 90,000 | — |
| 1982 | Alegria | Ariola | LP | 300,000 | Platinum |
| 1983 | Coração brasileiro | Ariola | LP | 400,000 | Platinum |
| 1984 | Fogo na mistura | Ariola | LP | 250,000 | Platinum |
| 1985 | Do Jeito que A Gente Gosta | Ariola | LP | 300,000 | Platinum |
| 1986 | Remexer | Ariola | LP | 200,000 | Gold |
| 1987 | Elba | Ariola | LP | 250,000 | Platinum |
| 1988 | Fruto | Ariola | LP | 150,000 | Gold |
| 1989 | Popular Brasileira | Ariola | LP | 150,000 | Gold |
| 1990 | Ao Vivo | Ariola | LP | 250,000 | Platinum |
| 1991 | Felicidade Urgente | Ariola | LP | 120,000 | Gold |
| 1992 | Encanto | Ariola | LP | 130,000 | Gold |
| 1993 | Devora-me | Ariola | LP | 140,000 | Gold |
| 1995 | Paisagem | BMG | CD | 250,000 | Platinum |
| 1996 | Leão do Norte | BMG | CD | 400,000 | Platinum |
| 1996 | Grande Encontro | BMG | CD | 1,200,000 | Diamond |
| 1997 | Baioque | BMG | CD | 120,000 | Gold |
| 1997 | Grande Encontro 2 | BMG | CD | 750,000 | 3× Platinum |
| 1998 | Flor da Paraíba | BMG | CD | 100,000 | Gold |
| 1999 | Solar | BMG | CD | 150,000 | Gold |
| 2000 | O Grande Encontro 3 | BMG | CD | 250,000 | Platinum |
| 2001 | Cirandeira | BMG | CD | 100,000 | Gold |
| 2002 | Elba Canta Luiz | BMG | CD | 100,000 | Gold |
| 2003 | Elba Ao Vivo | BMG | CD | 100,000 | Gold |
| 2005 | Elba e Dominguinhos Ao Vivo | BMG | CD | 50,000 | Gold |
| 2007 | Qual o Assunto Que Mais Lhe Interessa? | Ramax | CD | 40,000 | — |
| 2009 | Balaio de Amor | Biscoito Fino | CD | 40,000 | — |
| 2010 | Marco Zero Ao Vivo | Biscoito Fino | CD, DVD | 7,000 | — |
| 2013 | Vambora lá Dançar | Saladesom Records | CD | 10,000 | — |
| 2013 | Cordas, Gonzaga e Afins | Coqueiro Verde | CD, DVD | 3,500 | — |
| 2015 | Do Meu Olhar pra Fora | Coqueiro Verde | CD | 3,500 | — |

=== Guest performances ===
- Edu Falaschi – Vera Cruz (2021; vocals on "Rainha do Luar")
