= Alceu Valença =

Brazilian musician (born 1946)

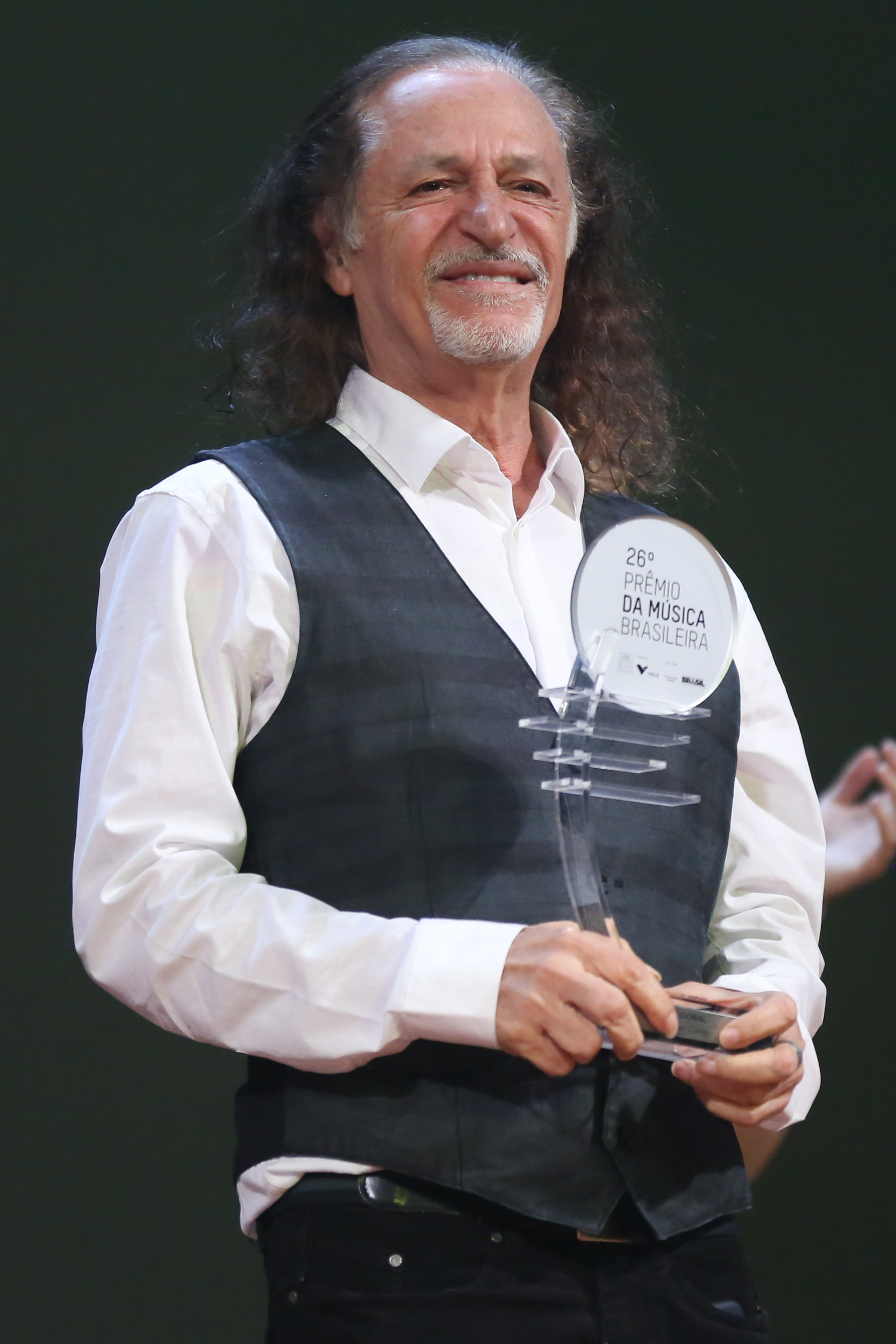
- Valença in 2015

Background information
- Born: Alceu Paiva Valença; July 1, 1946 (age 80); São Bento do Una, Pernambuco, Brazil
- Genres: MPB, Brazilian rock, frevo, worldbeat, baião
- Occupations: Singer, musician, songwriter
- Instruments: Voice, guitar
- Years active: 1968–present
- Website: alceuvalenca.com.br

Alceu Valença (Brazilian Portuguese: [awˈsew vaˈlẽsɐ]; born July 1, 1946) is a Brazilian singer, musician, and songwriter.

Alceu Valenca was born in the countryside of Pernambuco, Northeast Brazil. He is considered the most successful artist in achieving an aesthetic balance between traditional northeastern Brazilian music and a broad range of electronic sounds and effects from pop music. In most of his songs, one can find traces of maracatu, coco and "repentes de viola" (improvising fast-paced Brazilian folk music). Valença could utilize the electric guitar, the electric bass, and lately even a synthesizer was added to his broad scope of musical instruments.

Because of that, Valença was able to recreate Northeastern traditional music, like baião, coco, toada, maracatu, frevo, caboclinhos, embolada, and repentes: all sung with a sometimes rock, sometimes alternative sounding music background. His music incorporates varied themes, while maintaining an aesthetic basis in Brazilian Northeastern music.

== Biography ==
Alceu Valença was born in São Bento do Una in Northeast Brazil. When he was young, he used to listen to songs by Dalva de Oliveira, Orlando Silva, Sílvio Caldas etc. When he was 5 years old, he participated in a music contest, singing a song by Capiba. Some years later, his mother got sick and his family moved to Recife to live in his aunt's house. In this period, Valença got interested in some musical instruments, such as acoustic guitar and viola. However, he only won his own guitar when he was 15.

In 1970, Valença earned a law degree at the Recife Law School. However, he only followed the career for a few months. In fact, in the early 1970s, the reason he had no time for a law career was that he had already launched into a musical direction.

He started his musical career in 1968, with the group Underground Tamarineira Village, later known as Ave Sangria. He also played with Zé Ramalho and Elba Ramalho during this period. In 1972, he joined Geraldo Azevedo. Together, they participated of many festivals and, in that same years, recorded their first album: Alceu Valença & Geraldo Azevedo, also known as Quadrafônico.

Along his career, Valença recorded more than 20 albums and travelled around many countries, such as Portugal, France, Netherlands and United States. Actually, he is considered one of the greatest exponents of the music of Pernambuco.

Finally, with the 2013 release of Três Tons de Alceu Valença, a box with the oldies Cinco Sentidos (1981), Anjo Avesso (1983) and Mágico (1984) all of Alceu Valença's solo work is available on CD. In 2014, his album Amigo da Arte was nominated for the Latin Grammy Award for Best Brazilian Roots Album.

== Discography ==
=== Albums ===
- 1972: Alceu Valença & Geraldo Azevedo, Copacabana (aka Quadrafônico)
- 1974: A Noite do Espantalho, Continental (soundtrack, movie by Sérgio Ricardo, with Alceu Valença and Geraldo Azevedo)
- 1974: Molhado de suor, Som Livre
- 1976: Vivo!, Som Livre
- 1977: Espelho cristalino, Som Livre
- 1979: Saudade de Pernambuco, released in 1998 as a supplement of the newspaper Jornal da Tarde
- 1980: Coração bobo, Ariola
- 1981: Cinco sentidos, Ariola
- 1982: Cavalo de pau, Ariola
- 1983: Anjo avesso, Ariola
- 1984: Mágico, Barclay
- 1985: Estação da luz, RCA Victor
- 1985: Ao vivo, Barclay/Polygram
- 1986: Rubi, RCA Victor
- 1987: Leque moleque, BMG Ariola
- 1988: Oropa, França e Bahia, BMG Ariola
- 1990: Andar, andar, EMI Odeon
- 1992: 7 desejos, EMI Odeon
- 1994: Maracatus, batuques e ladeiras, BMG Ariola
- 1996: O grande encontro, BMG Brasil, with Elba Ramalho, Geraldo Azevedo and Zé Ramalho
- 1997: Sol e chuva, Som Livre
- 1998: Forró de todos os tempos, Oásis/Sony Music
- 1999: Todos os cantos, Abril Music
- 2001: Forró lunar, Columbia
- 2002: De janeiro a janeiro
- 2003: Ao vivo em todos os sentidos, Indie Records/Universal Music
- 2005: Na embolada do tempo, Indie Records/Universal Music
- 2006: Marco Zero ao vivo, Indie Records
- 2009: Ciranda mourisca, Biscoito Fino
- 2014: Amigo da Arte, Deck
- 2014: Valencianas, Deck, with Orquestra Ouro Preto

=== DVD ===
- 2003: Ao vivo em todos os sentidos
- 2006: Marco Zero ao vivo
- 2014: Valencianas, with Orquestra Ouro Preto
