= Robertinho do Recife =

Brazilian musician

- Born: Carlos Roberto Cavalcanti de Albuquerque; 1953 (age 72–73); Recife, Brazil
- Occupations: Musician, record producer, composer
- Instrument: Guitar

Carlos Roberto Cavalcanti de Albuquerque (born 1953), known as Robertinho do Recife, is a Brazilian guitarist, record producer, composer born in the city of Recife, Brazil. His first contact with the guitar was at the age of 10. After he was run over by a car, he had to stay long periods of time at home and had to watch a lot of TV. In one of these TV programs he met the Beatles and fell in love with the guitar. He got his first guitar as a gift from his grandfather. At the age of 12 he was already playing with bands in Recife. He had very good technique and later was invited to play with bands like: Watch Pocket, Chicago and Quiet Riot. He played a little of everything: from music for children, to heavy metal and neoclassical. At the end of the 1980s he played with the Brazilian band Yahoo, when they played a cover of "Love Bites", a song from the British band Def Leppard. He is currently working as a music producer in his own studio in Rio de Janeiro.

Since the 1970s he has worked with artists like Geraldo Azevedo, Zé Ramalho and Raimundo Fagner.

== Discography ==
- 1977: Jardim da Infância
- 1978: Robertinho no Passo (featuring Hermeto Pascoal)
- 1979: E Agora pra Vocês... Suingues Tropicais
- 1981: Satisfação
- 1982: Robertinho do Recife e Emilinha
- 1983: Ah, Robertinho do Mundo
- 1984: Metal Mania
- 1990: Rapsódia Rock
- 2014: Back For More
