= Geraldo Azevedo =

Brazilian singer, songwriter and guitarist

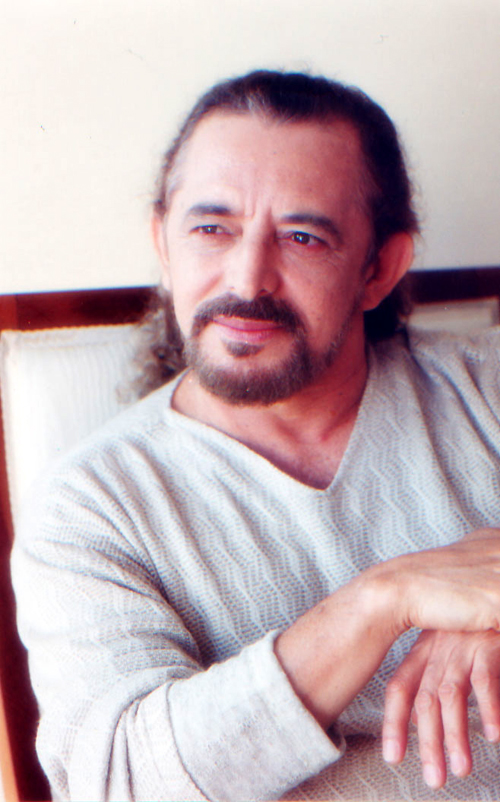

Background information
- Born: Geraldo Azevedo; January 11, 1945 (age 81)
- Origin: Petrolina, Pernambuco, Brazil
- Genres: Forró, MPB
- Occupations: Singer, songwriter, guitarist
- Years active: 1963–present
- Labels: Copacabana Records, Sigla Records, Polygram, Kuarup Records, RCA, BMG
- Website: http://www.geraldoazevedo.com.br/

Geraldo Azevedo de Amorim (born January 11, 1945) is a Brazilian singer, songwriter and guitarist. He is famous for his contributions to the Brazilian popular music (MPB) scene, especially his partnerships with Alceu Valença and Zé Ramalho.

== Discography ==
- Alceu Valença e Geraldo Azevedo (1972)
- Geraldo Azevedo
- Bicho-de-sete-cabeças
- Inclinações musicais
- For all para todos (1982)
- Tempo tempero (1983)
- A luz do solo (1984)
- Cantoria I (1984)
- Eterno presente (1988)
- Bossa tropical (1989)
- Berekekê (1991)
- Raízes e frutos
- Ao vivo comigo (1994)
- Futuramérica (1996)
- O grande encontro 1 (1996)
- O grande encontro 2 (1997)
- O grande encontro 3 (2000)
- Hoje amanhã (2000)
- O Brasil existe em mim (2007)
