= Brazilian rock =

Rock music made in or associated with Brazil

- Raul Seixas performing in 1972
- Stylistic origins: Rock, rock and roll, blues, Brazilian folk music, Latin rock, psychedelic music
- Cultural origins: Brazil in the late 1950s; fusion genres from the late 1960s
- Derivative forms: Tropicália

Subgenres
- Brazilian thrash metal, Brazilian punk

Fusion genres
- Samba rock, Forrocore, Mangue Beat, Rock Rural.

Regional scenes
- Brasília (1980-1996)

Brazilian rock refers to rock music produced in Brazil and usually sung in Portuguese. In the 1960s, it was known as iê-iê-iê, the Portuguese transcription of the line "Yeah, yeah, yeah" from the Beatles song "She Loves You".

== Overview ==
Rock entered the Brazilian music scene in 1956 with the screening of the film The Blackboard Jungle, featuring Bill Haley's "Rock Around the Clock", later covered in Portuguese by Nora Ney.

The electric guitar was introduced to Brazil in 1948, specifically in Salvador, by the carnival group Dodô e Osmar. They developed an instrument they called the pau elétrico ("electric stick"), notable for being the first electric guitar designed to eliminate microphonic feedback while producing a characteristic sustained sound. In 1949, Dodô and Osmar pioneered the use of this electric guitar in carnival celebrations, performing songs from an open car they dubbed the Trio Elétrico as they traveled through the streets of Salvador. This innovation has endured, evolving into today's large trucks that continue the tradition of mobile musical performances during Carnival.

== 1950s ==
In 1957, the first original Brazilian rock and roll song, Rock and roll em Copacabana, was penned by Miguel Gustavo. This pioneering track was recorded by the singer Cauby Peixoto and rose to #52 on the charts that year.

During this period, several bands performed songs that were rough translations of English lyrics, though several groups chose to focus on instrumental rock instead. This was in part inspired by instrumental bands such as Duane Eddy and The Champs. In 1958, this inspiration led to the release of the first Brazilian instrumental rock song, "Here's the Blue Jean Rockers" by The Blue Jean Rockers [pt]. Later the same year, Bolão & His Rockettes went on to record the country's first purely instrumental LP. These developments were crucial in establishing rock as a popular genre among Brazilian youth. Following these pioneering efforts, a wave of new bands emerged, including The Avalons, The Clevers [pt], The Rebels, The Jordans [pt], The Jet Blacks, The Pops, Os Populares, The Bells, The Lions, and The Youngs, further solidifying rock's place in Brazilian music culture.

1958 marked a watershed moment for Brazilian rock, witnessing the meteoric rise of several artists and bands. Notable figures such as Nora Ney, Nick Savoia, Celly Campelo, Tony Campelo (Celly Campelo's brother), Lana Bittencourt, Demétrius, Cinderella, Regiane, Ronnie Cord, and Hamilton di Giorgio achieved rapid success, establishing themselves as prominent names in the music scene virtually overnight. Additionally, instrumental groups such as the aforementioned Avalons, Tte Rebels, the Jordans, and Os Incríveis also gained widespread popularity, contributing to the vibrant and diverse landscape of Brazilian rock during this pivotal year.

== 1960s ==
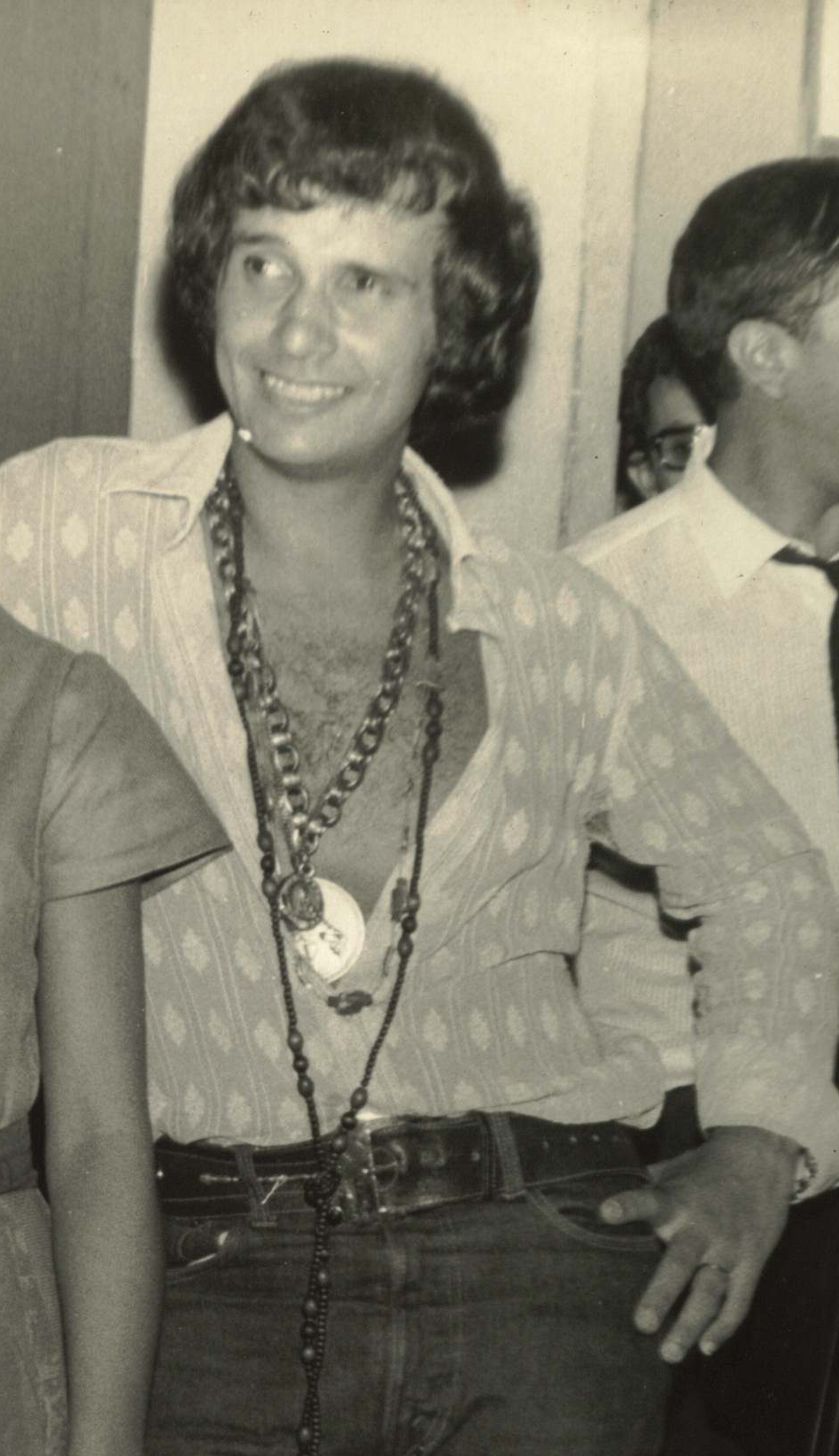
Roberto Carlos

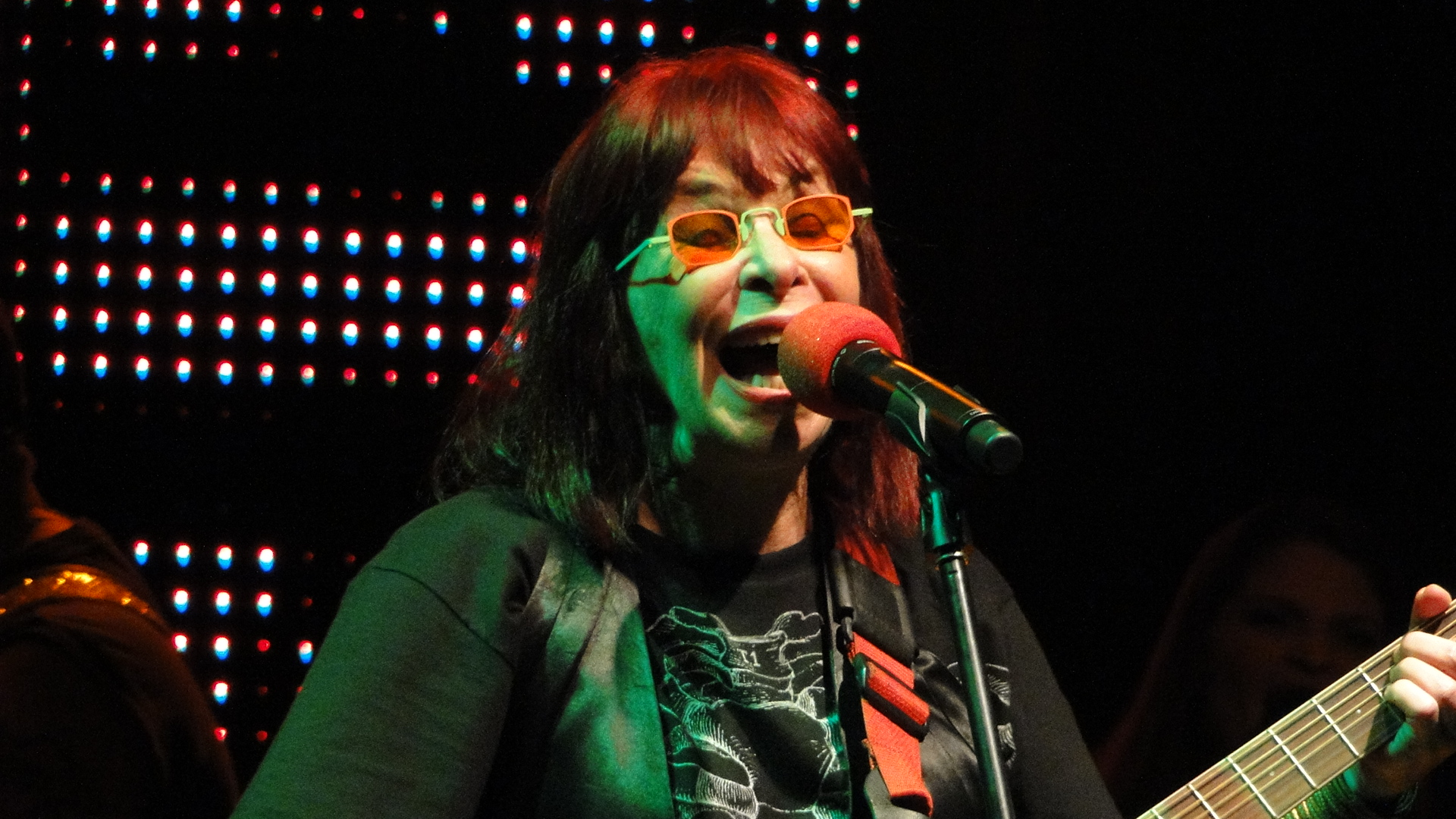
Rita Lee from Os Mutantes

When rock and roll took America by storm, Bill Haley and Elvis Presley also became liberating icons for Brazilian youth, who felt that they were under sexual and educational oppression, as Brazilian society had been based on the standards and rules of the Catholic church after colonization. Some movie theaters were wrecked during the showing of rock and roll movies.

Some radio disc-jockeys and recording companies set out to find new talents that could not only sing, but could also do it in perfect English.

Raul Seixas formed the first rock band from Salvador in 1965, the Panthers, which soon changed its name to Raulzito e os Panteras. Seixas was influenced by Luiz Gonzaga.

In 1963, Roberto Carlos had two hits: "Splish Splash", a Bobby Darin cover with Portuguese lyrics by Erasmo Carlos, and "Parei na Contramão" (I stopped at the wrong way), the first collaboration between Erasmo and Roberto Carlos. Roberto and Erasmo created Jovem Guarda. The beginning of the Jovem Guarda, with Roberto Carlos, Erasmo Carlos and Wanderléa, was a kind of Brazilian version of the North American garage bands in the 1960s but with a bit of influence from artists like Otis Redding. Ronnie Von started his career with the garage influence of Jovem Guarda, and his work unleashed the psychedelic style and he was who suggested the name of the band Os Mutantes. Jerry Adriani is identified with the Jovem Guarda too, but his influence on Brazilian rock is greater with his Italian rock/pop style: he brought Raul Seixas from Salvador to success afterward in Rio de Janeiro, allowing for his widespread national success and influence to future generations. Other artists and bands associated with the Jovem Guarda include Eduardo Araújo (and his late wife, Sylvinha Araújo), Martinha, Renato e Seus Blue Caps, Os Incríveis, Golden Boys, Os Vips, Vanusa and The Fevers.

Jorge Ben Jor (then known only as Jorge Ben) had several hits and transited between Jovem Guarda and a new form of playing guitar, with a rhythmic form that he invented. This new style was named Samba-rock, a style which would be followed by Banda Black Rio, Trio Mocotó, Luís Vagner, Bebeto, Orlandivo and Wilson Simonal, among others.

The band The Bubbles, formed in 1965 in Rio de Janeiro, along with Serguei, who released his first album in 1966, served as a bridge between psychedelic rock and the garage rock of Jovem Guarda. In São Paulo Os Baobás made their mark by recording cover versions of songs by the Kinks, Love, the Turtles and the Rolling Stones, during the beginning of their activities. From the 1960s, Os Primitivos, hailing from Brasília, blended traditional folk rock (reminiscent of the Byrds) with Brazilian Northeastern folk music such as baião. Other bands that straddled the line between garage rock and Jovem Guarda, while also hinting at the beginning of psychedelia, were: O'Seis, José Luiz and The Pop's.

In the legendary show named Opinião, in 1964, the first Brazilian genuine musical, Zé Keti represented the black people, João do Vale, the people from the Northeastern region, and Nara Leão (then substituted by Maria Bethânia) represented the woman from the Brazilian high society. The innovative proposal of this show changed Brazilian music forever from the post-Bossa Nova period because it introduced other Brazilian genres to popular music. Sometimes, with the protest characteristic, the MPB base was formed: Chico Buarque, Edu Lobo, Geraldo Vandré, Sérgio Ricardo, João Donato, Eumir Deodato, Roberto Menescal, MPB4, Quarteto em Cy, Francis Hime, and Joyce, arising from Bossa Nova, despite the music is not rock, their collaboration is important on almost all popular urban genres, including the rock. In 1969, Marcos Valle, who belonged to the second generation of the Bossa Nova, changed his style to a psychedelic rock and soul music Brazilian concept, and his brother Paulo Sérgio Valle went in a similar way. Sidney Miller is a very important musician for the MPB transformation process because he included rock and the 60s and 70s international pop in his music. From this post-bossa nova time, Tuca, a female singer/songwriter, traveled to Europe in 1969, settling in Paris for six years (she has performed for several countries including Spain, Italy, and Holland) when in 1971 Françoise Hardy released the album "La question", the result of a close partnership between both and thereafter, her performance turned more rocker.

The Tropicália movement turned the psychedelic rock and the use of electric instruments more popular in Brazilian music. Some tropicalistas were: Caetano Veloso, Gilberto Gil, Tom Zé, Gal Costa, Rogério Duprat, Torquato Neto, Nara Leão, and others. The seminal "tropicalista" Os Mutantes influenced and tended the psychedelic rock and roll and is one reference for several relevant bands and musicians in the world.

Clube da Esquina, a group of friends from Minas Gerais, one of the most culturally prolific regions of Brazil, was joined with the Tropicália and Jovem Guarda responsible for the diffusion on a bigger scale by the electrification of the pop and rock music, with a universal, but Brazilian proposal. Some musicians from this group are: Milton Nascimento, Lô Borges, Toninho Horta, Beto Guedes, Novelli, Nelson Angelo, Tavinho Moura and the band Som Imaginário.

== 1970s ==
The 1970s started with progressive rock, hard rock, and glam rock, but was a period of mutual interference between Brazilian pop music MPB and rock.

Rita Lee (former Mutantes vocalist) started her own work with her band Tutti Frutti, with glam rock-like aesthetics. Other bands from this period include Casa das Máquinas with its music between glam-hard-rock and progressive, Patrulha do Espaço (also formed by a former Mutantes member, Arnaldo Baptista) between progressive and Hard rock, Made in Brazil with its hard rock (but in some songs already with the minimal characteristic of punk rock), the pure hard rock of Bixo da Seda, Edy Star, with his pure glam rock and the proto-metal band O Peso.

There were many progressive rock bands in Brazil, such as O Terço, Mutantes (without Rita Lee), A Bolha (Hard rock with Progressive mix), Módulo 1000, A Barca do Sol which made the remarkable album with Olivia Byington Corra o Risco, Som Nosso de Cada Dia, Bixo da Seda, Vímana (in which Lulu Santos and Lobão started their musical careers), Moto Perpétuo and Bacamarte, some of which have become well known in Europe and the US by progressive fans. The progressive rock band Som Imaginário had an experimental characteristic: jazz, bossa nova, contemporary music, impressionist music with the traditional folk and baroque from State of Minas Gerais resulting in a kind of a Brazilian art rock version, and with renowned musicians: Wagner Tiso, Zé Rodrix, Tavito, Luiz Alves, Frederyko. Lula Côrtes and Zé Ramalho with their album Paêbirú that was originally released in 1975 (see 1975 in music), despite representing very well the Brazilian psychedelic movement of the 1960s and 1970s, it can also be considered like an experimental mix of progressive rock and Brazilian northeast folk music certainly. Another band with only one album, but today considered a classic of Brazilian rock is Karma with the work of the same name released in 1972: a forceful melodic Brazilian folk music with a vocal that remember The Byrds, and a bit of progressive rock and jazz, consistent orchestral arranges, and the famous Jorge Amiden's tritarra (a guitar with three arms).

From that period, a genre known as "Rock Rural" emerged, blending Brazilian folk music with rock. Notable artists in this genre include Zé Rodrix, Ave Sangria, Sá & Guarabyra, Ruy Maurity Trio, Almôndegas . This movement also saw a radical form of Brazilian folk music, which sometimes overlapped with rock, significantly influencing Brazilian rock at the time. Artists like Dércio Marques, Elomar, Xangai, Sérgio Reis, Diana Pequeno led this trend, followed by Almir Sater and Renato Teixeira in the 1980s. Marlui Miranda, known for her expertise in Brazilian indigenous music, represents an even more radical departure. Though her music is not traditionally categorized as rock, her innovative folk compositions contributed to the alternative aesthetic.

The "carioca" (from Rio de Janeiro city) Azymuth, was formed in 1969 and is the Jazz rock side of this generation, but is responsible for the Brazilian pop music development too. There are great musicians that can add up here - Jazz rock influence: Airto Moreira, Raul de Souza, Flora Purim, Hermeto Pascoal, Naná Vasconcelos, Arthur Verocai, André Geraissati, Egberto Gismonti, Grupo D'Alma, Eumir Deodato, and Sérgio Mendes (with Funk influence too).

This higher mix between rock and Brazilian pop music resulted in several famous musicians and bands: Secos & Molhados (identified as glam rock too), Raul Seixas, Novos Baianos, A Cor do Som, Robertinho do Recife and a union of Caetano Veloso, Gal Costa, Maria Bethânia and Gilberto Gil in the show named Doces Bárbaros. After the end of Secos & Molhados, João Ricardo continued his career, and his first album was all glam, Ney Matogrosso continued with great success and Gérson Conrad was constructing an alternative career. Other musicians - that helped to turn the traditional Brazilian music more flexible, with powerful rock or pop influences - were a relative hit too, like Elis Regina, Alceu Valença, Geraldo Azevedo, Belchior, Gonzaguinha, Zé Ramalho, Raimundo Fagner, Luiz Melodia, Boca Livre, Maria Alcina, Luli e Lucina and after the end of Novos Baianos, Baby Consuelo (then Baby do Brasil), Pepeu Gomes and Moraes Moreira, but there were musicians that made a more experimental mix, who didn't have the same good luck in their careers and access to the media, and because of this are known as "malditos", the darns, but at a later time they will be an important reference for the second Brazilian alternative scene - they are: Ednardo, Walter Franco, Jorge Mautner, Jards Macalé, Taiguara, Arnaldo Baptista (Mutantes) and Sérgio Sampaio. Marku Ribas is the side more Black music of this group and was Bob Marley's friend in the 1970s, Jamaica, where he lived. On the other hand, Tim Maia, directly influenced by Soul music side of the Jovem Guarda, made several hits, and his style influenced bands like Placa Luminosa and Skowa e a Máfia in the 80s.

In the 1970s, several attempts were made to organize festivals in Brazil. The "Festival de Verão de Guarapari" (Guarapari Summer Festival) in 1971 aimed to be a significant hippie gathering but faced organizational issues. Despite this, it remains a historic event, featuring performances by Milton Nascimento and Som Imaginário, A Bolha, Novos Baianos, Luiz Gonzaga and Tony Tornado. Another notable effort was the Primeiro Festival de Iacanga (First Iacanga Festival) in the State of São Paulo in 1975, held on a large farm with improved infrastructure. This festival became a landmark of the Brazilian underground, showcasing such bands as Jazzco, Apokalypsis, Som Nosso de Cada Dia, Moto Perpétuo, Ursa Maior, Rock da Mortalha, Orquestra Azul among others. The first Hollywood Rock festival took place in Rio, 1975 too, featuring performances by Raul Seixas, Rita Lee, O Terço, Vímana and others. Additionally, the 1970s saw two major international concerts in Brazil: Alice Cooper (1974) and Genesis (1977).

In the late 1970s, the progressive reference was still felt in Guilherme Arantes and 14 Bis (band).

=== Disco influence ===
Disco music, which arrived in Brazil in the 1970s, influenced artists such Rita Lee and Zé Rodrix. As Frenéticas became an instant phenomenon with their mix of Brazilian rock and disco.

=== Punk ===
The Brazilian punk rock scene emerged in the late 1970s in São Paulo, drawing inspiration from bands such as the Sex Pistols, MC5, Iggy & The Stooges and The Ramones. . Douglas Viscaino, a pioneering musician, played a key role in adopting and nurturing punk culture. He united young people in opposition to Brazil's military regime, channeling revolutionary ideas through the politically charged band Restos de Nada, which began performing in 1978. During the late 70s, interest in punk music rapidly expanded across the country. Early bands like AI-5 and N.A.I. (later known as Condutores de Cadáver) emerged in São Paulo, Carne Podre in Curitiba, and Aborto Elétrico in Brasília, marking the nationwide spread of the punk movement.

The first records from the end of the 1970s to the 1980s were demo tapes because Brazil had a dictatorial regime until 1985. From its beginnings, the Brazilian punk music style was more reminiscent of Jello Biafra of the Dead Kennedys than the Sex Pistols, that is, more akin to hardcore punk. An independent label named Punk Rock Discos was created at the beginning of the 1980s, which produced the first record of an individual Brazilian punk band, Lixomania, a six-song record released in 1982. By the same label, the first long play by a Brazilian punk band appeared in the same year, the Grito Suburbano album, with three bands from São Paulo city: Cólera, Olho Sêco and the Inocentes. Some of these first records are rare and well paid for by collectors in Europe and Japan. Brazilian punk rock gained visibility in the international media in 1982 with O Começo do Fim do Mundo, a festival that peacefully gathered rival gangs for the first time, and it is one of the biggest punk festivals in the world today. In 1985, a band led by Brazilian musician Supla released its first LP through a major label. In 1986, Inocentes and Replicantes, too, when the Brazilian punk scene was already growing colder. In 1986, Cólera was the first Brazilian punk band to perform internationally, and then Ratos de Porão. In the 1990s, punk returned to the scene. Some examples of bands: Renegados, Coquetel Molotov, Zumbis do Espaço, Ludovic, Mukeka di Rato, Blind Pigs (today Porcos Cegos), Carbona, Flicts, Ação Direta, Ack, Gritando HC, Nitrominds, Tequila Bab, Dominatrix, Motores, Pastel de Miolos, Sweet Suburbia, Hellsakura, Pupila Dilatada, Dance of Days.

Wander Wildner, former frontman of Replicantes, released his solo debut in 1996 with a creative punk fusion that he named Punk-brega.

The early Brazilian punk scene was immortalized in the documentary Botinada: A Origem do Punk no Brasil directed by former MTV VJ Gastão Moreira.

== 1980s ==
Even though the 1960s witnessed the phenomenon of Jovem Guarda and the 1970s saw the appearance of many prolific artists, like Raul Seixas, and bands like Os Mutantes, Brazilian rock's explosion began in 1981 with the Brazilian new wave, later renamed the New Jovem Guarda by the media. Punk rock was already incorporated but Ska, Post-punk and brazilian ingredients was new. English new wave, with its surprising variety of styles, arrived in Brazil through groups and personalities such as the Agentss, Blitz, Camisa de Vênus, Barão Vermelho, Kid Abelha, Os Paralamas do Sucesso, Fausto Fawcett, Lulu Santos, Rádio Táxi, Sempre Livre, Marina Lima, Dr. Silvana & Cia., Kiko Zambianchi, Engenheiros do Hawaii, RPM, Metrô, Ultraje a Rigor, Legião Urbana, Ira!, Titãs, Capital Inicial, Nenhum de Nós, Dulce Quental, Biquíni Cavadão, Zero, Violeta de Outono, Fellini, Vange Leonel, Os Cascavelletes, Black Future, Léo Jaime and João Penca e Seus Miquinhos Amestrados. Rock in Rio took over a million people to "Cidade do Rock" during the 10 days of the event, and established Brazil as a venue for international artists - some artists, like Santana and Queen, had come before this event, but the number of international attractions rose abruptly after Rock in Rio.

Sepultura was formed in 1984 by brothers Max and Igor Cavalera; the band was a major force in the groove metal, thrash metal and death metal genres during the late 1980s and early 1990s, with their later experiments drawing influence from alternative metal, world music, nu metal, hardcore punk, and industrial metal.

From Minas Gerais, the instrumental group Uakti was debuting and despite their music not being rock in the classic meaning, their experimental music with the instruments built by the group (Anton Walter Smetak influence) started a new era in the Brazilian popular music.

The underground scene had - Post-punk with Jazz, Funk, Folk, Rap, Reggae, Art rock, Thrash metal, Dodecaphonic, and Atonal experience - experimental bands and musicians such as Arrigo Barnabé, Itamar Assumpção, Susana Salles, Robson Borba, Grupo Rumo, Tetê Espíndola, Eliete Negreiros, Bocato, Patife Band, Tiago Araripe, Os Mulheres Negras, Hermelino Neder - this group was identified as São Paulo Vanguard or "Vanguarda Paulistana", from the beginning of the 1980s. Some "cariocas" (from Rio de Janeiro) representatives of this style are Tim Rescala and Letícia Garcia.

On the other hand, had Hard rock, Punk rock and Heavy metal bands such as Vênus from the State of Piauí, Golpe de Estado, Viper, Korzus, Ratos de Porão, Mammoth and Karisma from the State of São Paulo, DeFalla from the State of Rio Grande do Sul, Sepultura from the State of Minas Gerais, and Dorsal Atlântica from the State of Rio de Janeiro, from the mid to late 1980s - this last, the pioneer in the unification of this three styles of hard music. But one of the first bands of extreme metal from Brazil is Sarcófago, also from Belo Horizonte, formed in 1985. The female Thrash metal band Volkana was founded in 1987 in Brasília.

This movement is seen as a reflection of the worldview of urban youth who had grown up under a dictatorial regime and faced such processes as industrial expansion. This is the same generation that enjoyed the democratic abertura (opening) and began to absorb rather quickly an infinite amount of new information, previously inaccessible. The universe of that generation appeared rich in diversity, implying a desire to enjoy the present.

In the 1980s and beginning of the 1990s another group that mixes electronic music scene up appeared - in Santos, Campinas, São Paulo and Rio de Janeiro cities - Electronic post-punk, Industrial, EBM, Technopop, and the similar genres - and some bands and artists are well known in Europe: Loop B, Harry, Sicilian Unit, Individual Industry, Biopsy, Simbolo, City Limits, Tetine, Inhumanoids, Morgue, Suba (his album "São Paulo Confessions" is a worldwide milestone to the Electronic music), Tek Noir etc.

It's important to emphasize that the history of the record label Baratos Afins became forever intertwined with the indie history in São Paulo and Brazil.

Two musicians and singer-songwriters, Renato Russo from Legião Urbana and Cazuza from Barão Vermelho, began brilliant solo careers from the 1980s to the 1990s but were HIV fatal victims.

In the 1980s, Fluminense FM, a radio station based in Niterói, Rio de Janeiro, became known as "the gateway to Brazilian rock," as it helped promote rock music in Brazil and boosted the careers of bands that are now famous.

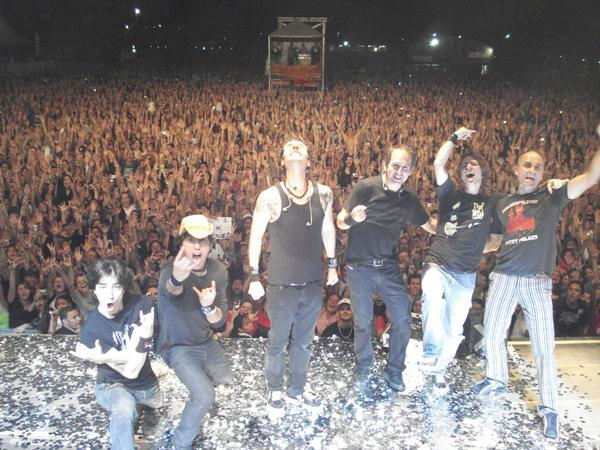
Capital Inicial

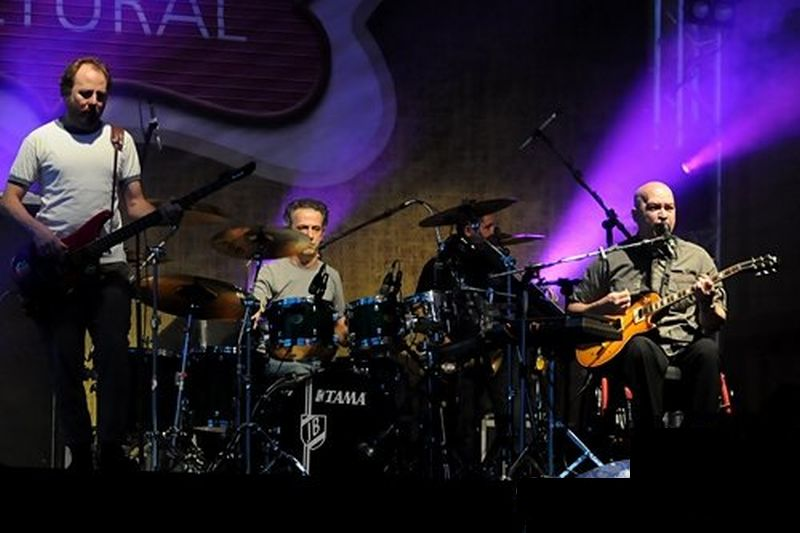
Paralamas do Sucesso

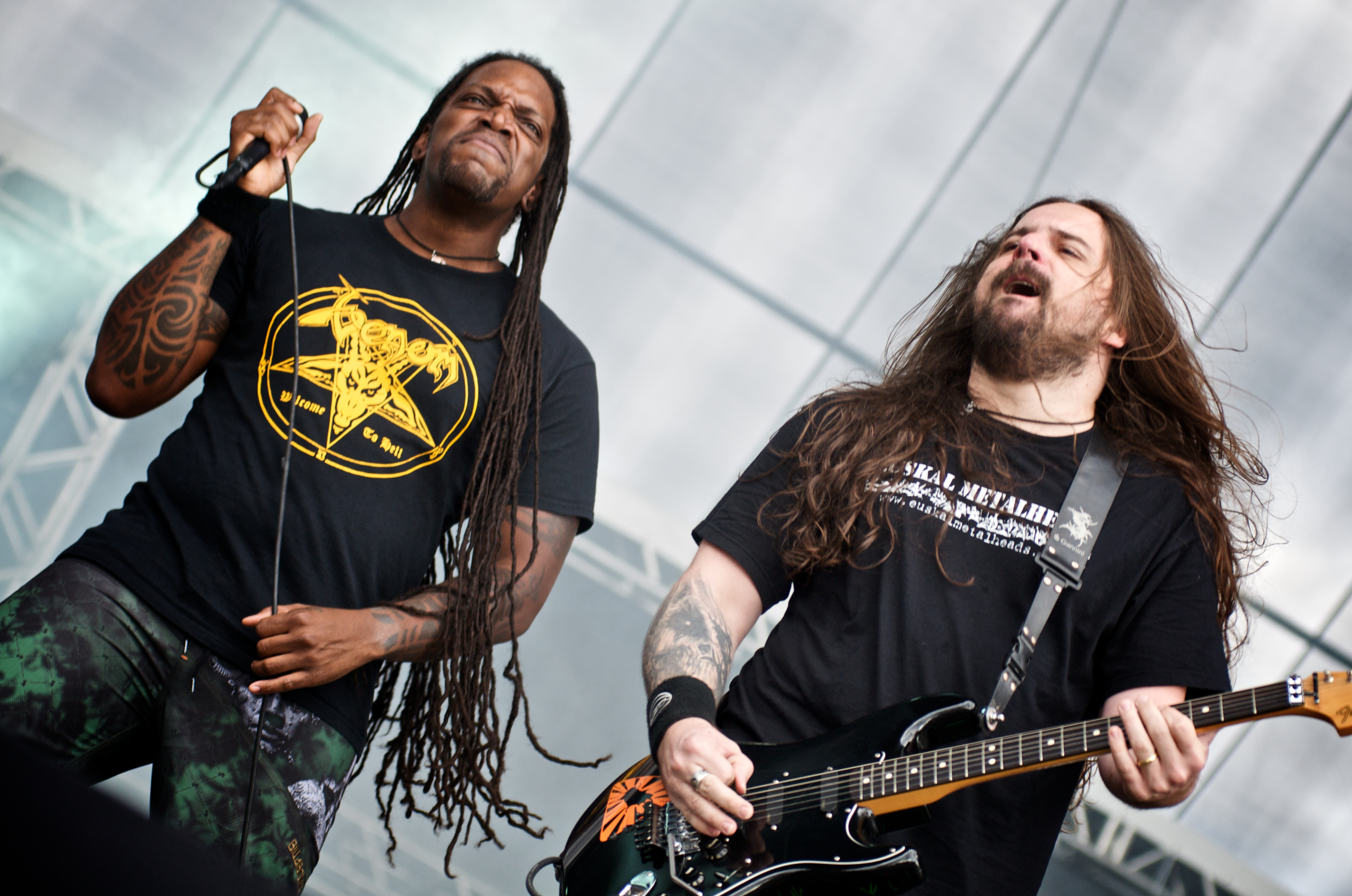
Sepultura

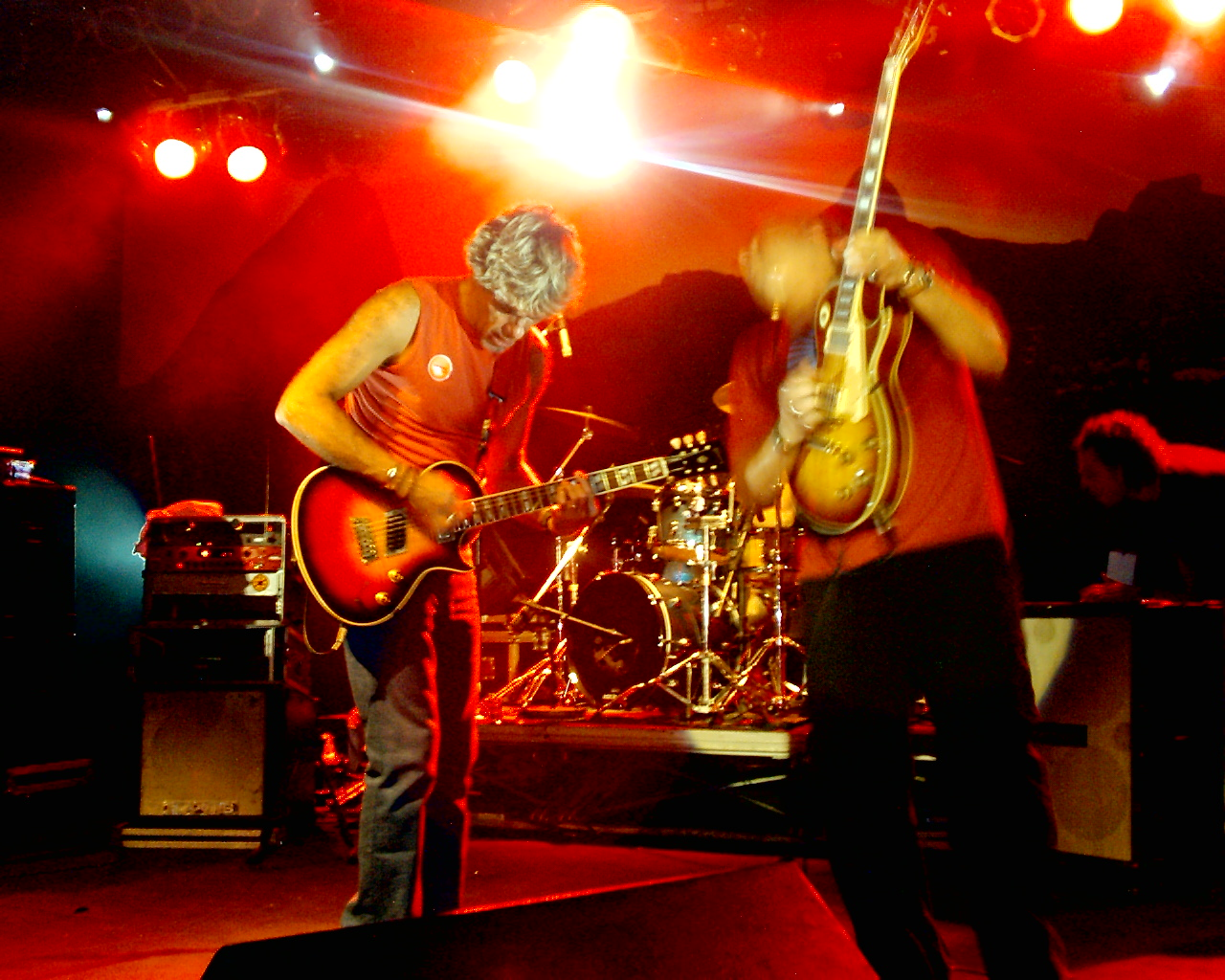
Ultraje a Rigor

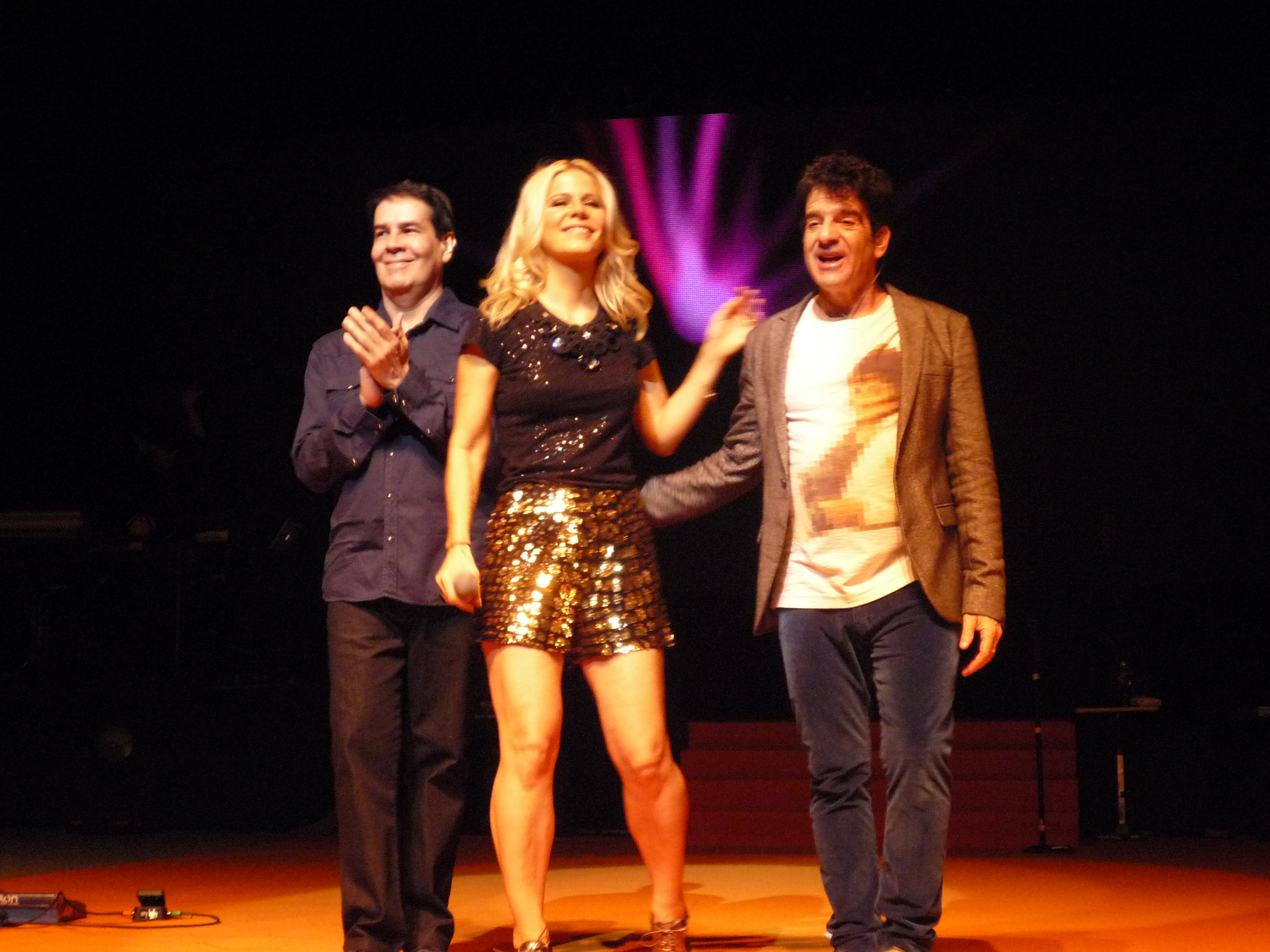
Kid Abelha

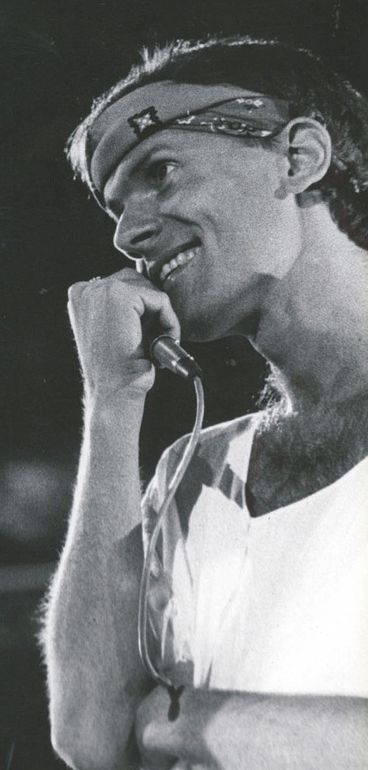
Cazuza from Barão Vermelho

== 1990s ==
At the start of the 1990s, the Brazilian music scene witnessed the birth of one of its most significant independent movements, influenced by British and American bands known for their loud, noisy guitar sounds, such as Sonic Youth, The Jesus and Mary Chain, My Bloody Valentine, and The Telescopes. This movement was characterised by its use of loud, noisy guitars, intense feedback, energetic performances, and English lyrics. Guitar bands began to emerge throughout the country, drawing criticism from music journalists who frequently questioned these bands' proficiency in a foreign language.

The most influential guitar bands of this period were Maria Angélica Não Mora Mais Aqui, Pin Ups, Second Come, Killing Chainsaw, Mickey Junkies, PELVs, The Cigarettes, Low Dream, brincando de deus, WRY, Garage Fuzz (started as a guitar band and later became hardcore), Beach Lizards, Dash, Dago Red, Velouria, Shed, Dead Poets and Snooze.

This moment can be called the first Brazilian independent scene (or indie scene). It was time to Grunge and Britpop, the distorted colors, the development of hardcore, and a return to Punk. The independent festival Juntatribo in Campinas in 1993 and 1994 and BHRIF - Belo Horizonte Rock Independente Festival in Belo Horizonte (Minas Gerais), in 1994 was a milestone and became the independent attitude a new option.

The 1990s also saw a resurgence in instrumental rock's popularity, and some of the classic bands from previous decades reformed. Surf music also became popular, especially The Argonauts, The Gasolines, and Os Ostras. Hard Rock had in 1993 a new representative in Brazil, Dr. Sin. Heavy metal had two debuts: in 1990 Torture Squad and in 1991 Angra - all of these are from São Paulo.

Also in this period, many other bands acquired widespread national projection, such as: Raimundos (which was formed in the late 1980s, but only released its first album in 1994) with its Forrocore style, Skank and O Rappa, both of which with a style that can be designated like a kind of reggae-rock, Pato Fu as the first indie band that arrived at mainstream, Charlie Brown Jr., with its alternative rock with rap and skate punk influences, and Mamonas Assassinas, who was a great hit with humour and rock but its members died in a tragic plane accident (1996). Also, Jota Quest was a success since the first album, 1996, and they arrived with a powerful pop-rock-funk.

From the end of the 1980s to beginning of the 1990s names like Planet Hemp, Karnak, Walverdes, Relespública, Virna Lisi, Graforreia Xilarmônica, Okotô and Boi Mamão are prominent.

The MTV Brasil Unplugged format brought back to the mainstream some bands whose career had been mainly consolidated in the 1980s, like the Titãs in 1997, Capital Inicial in 2000, Ira! in 2004 and Lobão in 2007.

At the beginning of the 1990s there was the Manguebeat (or Mangue Bit) movement that put Recife definitively as one of the principal places that has an important modern rock scene. Its style is a cross between the local rhythms, like Maracatu, and rock, hip hop and electronic music. Coming from this movement are Chico Science & Nação Zumbi (who shortened their name to only Nação Zumbi following Science's death), Mundo Livre S/A, Fred 04, DJ Dolores, Stela Campos, Otto etc.

Kurt Cobain after his shows in Brazil with Nirvana in 1993 helped spread the Brazilian rock in the world. David Byrne, Beck, Of Montreal, Devendra Banhart and others were influenced by the 1960s Tropicália and have divulged this musical style to the world. In the 1990s, Björk, Stereolab, Towa Tei, Amon Tobin and The High Llamas were approaching the Brazilian pop music increasingly.

Between the final 1990s and the beginning of the 21st century are relevant: Los Hermanos that is a noteworthy reference to the independent bands. Cássia Eller, who recorded several songs of the Brazilian rock musicians with powerful vocals and suddenly died in 2001. Pitty, the rarity of being a woman bandleader (with the band of the same name), has typified her career with brave lyrics and uncommon vocals. Lobão (who in the 1980s was mainstream) started his independent career and is obtaining a brilliant result, and the singer of Sepultura, Max Cavalera, left the band and started Soulfly with the same powerful Heavy metal.

The important hardcore scene from Brasília continued in this period with Raimundos and Rumbora. In the highlight of Raimundos, Rodolfo Abrantes, the vocal, decided to go out and assembled a new band, Rodox, in 2002, but they continued with the typical creative explosion of hardcore into the end of the band, in 2004.

Some rock genres are very specific in Brazil, but with an important scene since the 90s like Grindcore, Guitar, Psychobilly, Death Metal, Ska Punk, etc. Some highlights are Tihuana, Sapo Banjo, Madame Machado, Rusty Machine, Kães Vadius, and Sick Sick Sinners. There are several festivals about these genres in Brazil with faithful fans in Brazil. Krisiun is an example of Death Metal band that is a hit of this genre abroad of Brazil: they toured extensively through North America, South America, and Europe (recording their first official DVD while in Poland).

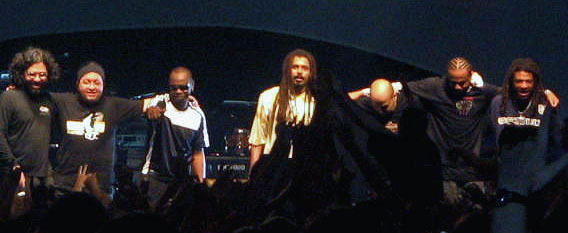
O Rappa

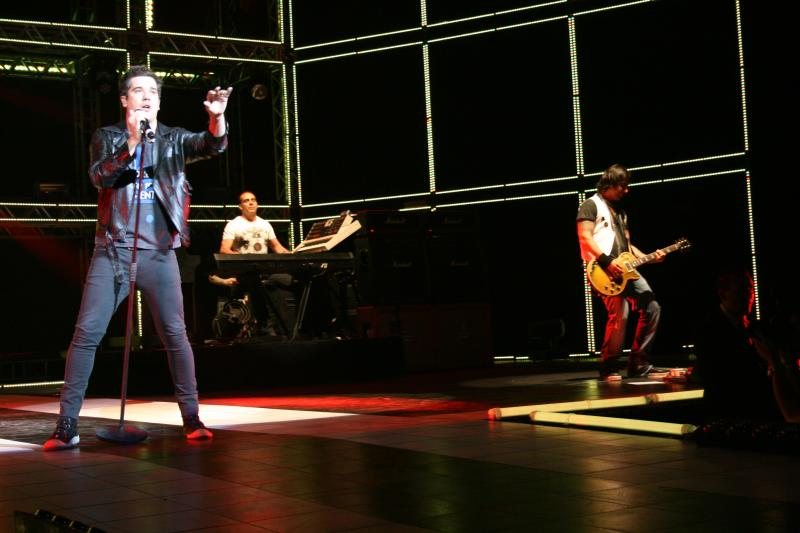
Jota Quest

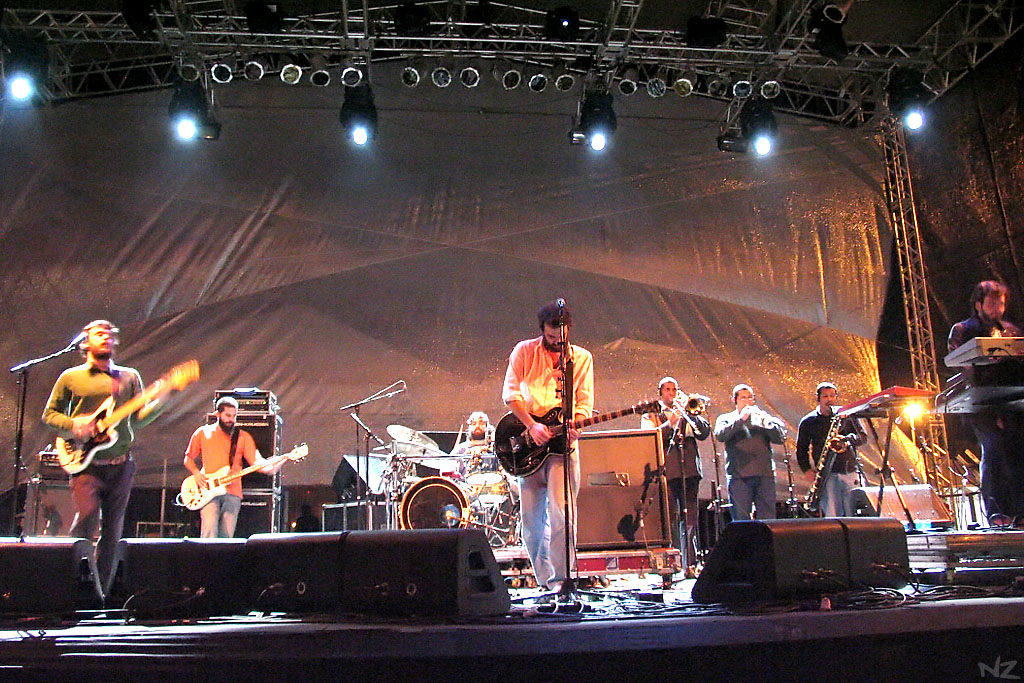
Los Hermanos

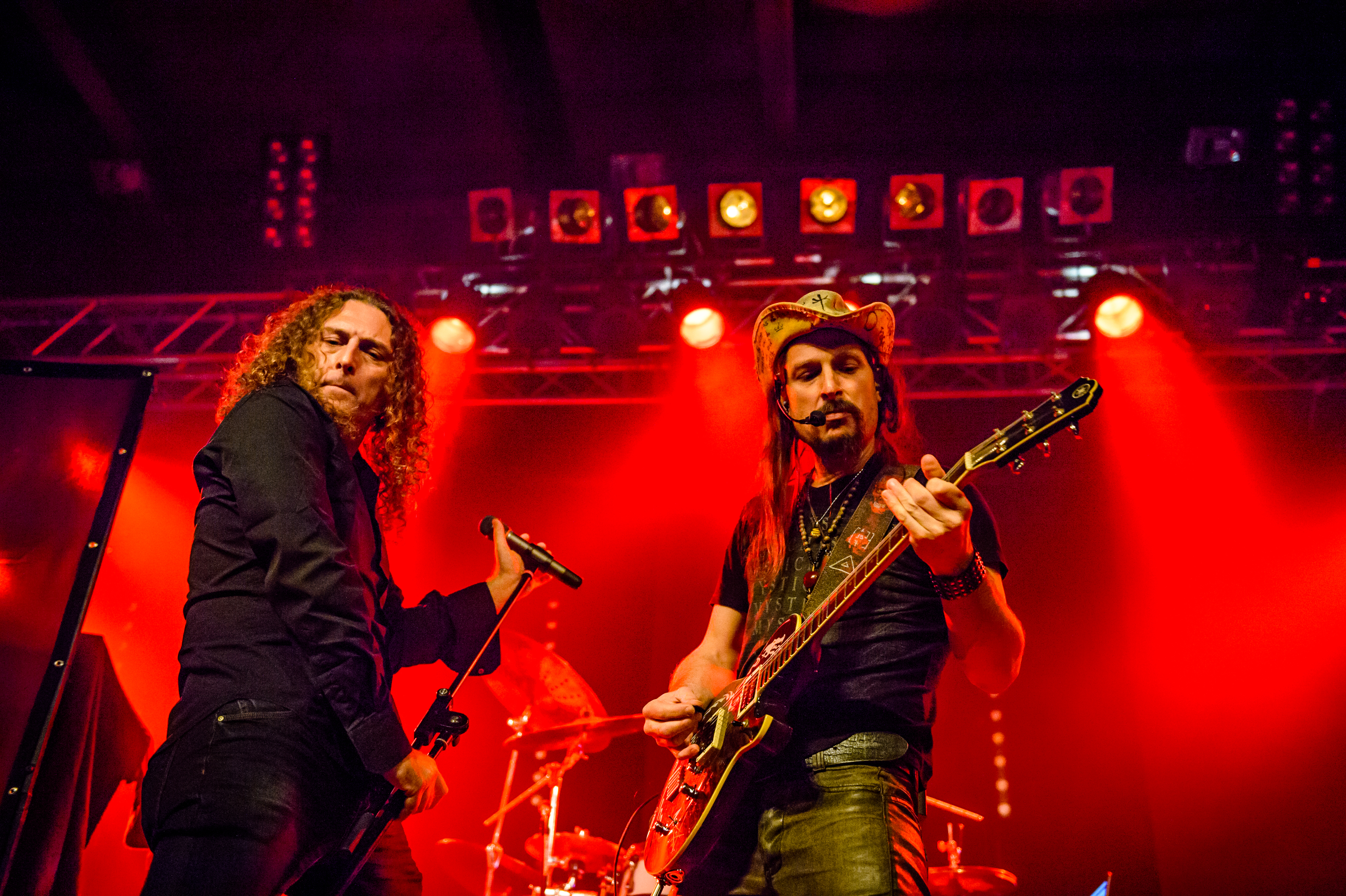
Angra

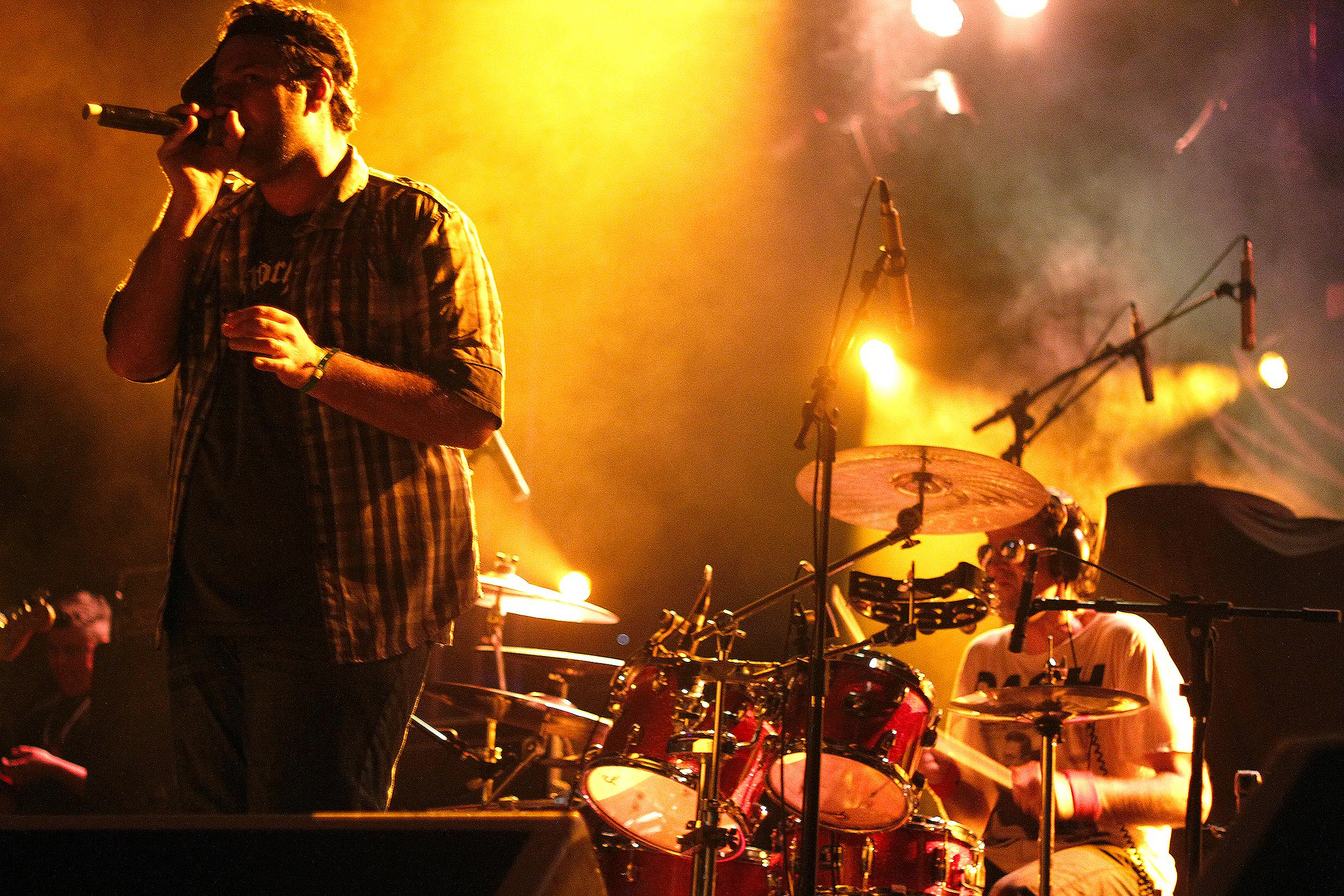
Charlie Brown Jr.

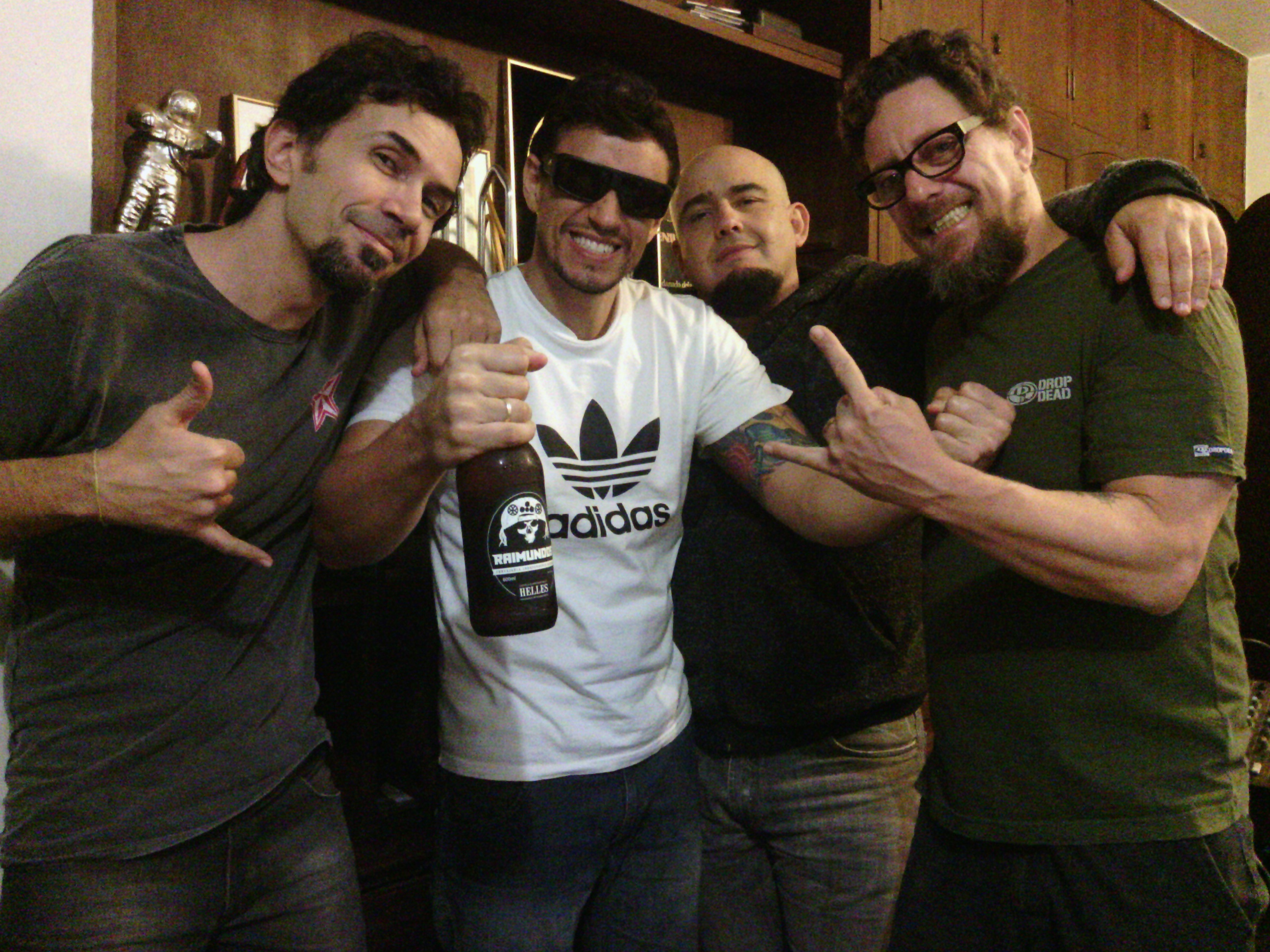
Raimundos

== The early years of the 2000s ==
The boundary between MPB - "Música popular brasileira" - and international electric pop and rock was largely broken with the TV Record Festival (1967), a milestone seen in the documentary Uma Noite em 67, and Tropicalismo. Brazilian popular music resulted from a gradual union of regional folk music and contemporary urban references. However, in 1967, the dichotomy was evident ("MPB" versus electric music) because it was a visible beginning of the electric fusion in acoustic Brazilian music.

Musicians and bands of the 90s absorbed definitely the rock aesthetic in the "MPB" or vice versa: Chico César, Fernanda Abreu, Paula Morelenbaum, Adriana Calcanhotto, Lenine, Paulinho Moska, Ed Motta, Badi Assad, Marisa Monte, Carlinhos Brown, Arnaldo Antunes, Nando Rei Zeca Baleiro, Lula Queiroga, Jair Oliveira, Wilson Simoninha, Léo Minax, Chico Amaral, Marina Machado, Bebel Gilberto, Zélia Duncan, Tony Platão (or Toni Platão), Pedro Mariano and Max de Castro.

In the first decade of the millennium, many musicians had already incorporated the new rock as an alternative aesthetic to this generation. This new fusion is encountered in Fernando Catatau, Vanessa da Mata who has done backing vocals for Black Uhuru, Tatá Aeroplano, CéU, Curumin, Orquestra Imperial, The +2's, Mariana Aydar, Karina Buhr (see also Comadre Florzinha), Seu Jorge, Ana Cañas, Nina Becker, Rômulo Fróes, Márcia Castro, 3 na Massa, Bruno Morais, Cérebro Eletrônico, Fino Coletivo, Tulipa Ruiz, Thiago Pethit, Tiê, Marcelo Jeneci, Dante Ozzetti, Moisés Santana, Miriam Maria, Jonas Sá, Sergio Molina, Cicero, M. Takara, Leo Cavalcanti, Sobrado 112, Banda Sincrônica, Pedro Osmar, Gutti Mendes, Marcelo Pretto, Orquestra Contemporânea de Olinda, Kristoff Silva, Lu Horta, and Mandrágora. The Vanessa da Mata songs "Ai, Ai, Ai" and "Boa Sorte/Good Luck" (with guest vocals by Ben Harper) became number-one hits in Brazil.

The real independent attitude also a growing audience at the beginning of the 21st century. There are a lot of opportunities with the festivals such as Bananada (Goiânia), Porão do Rock (Brasília), Camping Rock (Itabirito), Humaitá Pra Peixe (Rio de Janeiro), Grito Rock (itinerant), Fora do Eixo (itinerant), Abril Pro Rock (Recife), Goiânia Noise (Goiânia), Mada (festival) (Natal, Rio Grande do Norte), Calango (festival)(Cuiabá), Festival Garimpo (Belo Horizonte), Varadouro (Rio Branco), Rec-Beat (Recife), Jambolada (Uberlândia), Vaca Amarela (Goiânia) and independent labels (like Monstro Discos, Senhor F, Mondo 77, Trama, Travolta Discos, Deckdisc, Urban Jungle, Fora do Eixo Discos, Escárnio e Osso). It's a moment of intense creativity. The Brazilian indie scene, with the support of the internet, MTV, and the festivals gain a captive audience. Part is influenced by the Hard Rock, Hardcore, Metal, and part is influenced by 1990s rock, after the Strokes and Radiohead boom. There are references to 1970s Brazilian music and Glam rock, Folk music (Brazilian or not), 1980s B-rock, from the 1980s São Paulo Vanguard, Jovem Guarda (the garage side of this genre), Tropicália, the Samba rock and the Black music revisited, Electro, Rap, Ska, Jazz, Dub music, Funk Carioca and part is influenced by almost every one of these genres. A large number of bands were created. Among pioneers from this period are Cachorro Grande, Tetine, Cordel do Fogo Encantado, Cansei de Ser Sexy (CSS), Autoramas, Cibelle, Udora, Pedro Luís e a Parede, Bnegão, Cascadura, Mombojó, Forgotten Boys, Gram, Ludov, Cidadão Instigado, Canto dos Malditos na Terra do Nunca, Bidê ou Balde, Lampirônicos, Leela, Fernando Chuí, Hurtmold (instrumental), Zumbi do Mato, Mopho, Os Pistoleiros, Polara, Declinium, Pullovers, Mamelo Sound System, MQN, Vulgue Tolstoi, Flu, Doiseu Mimdoisema, Hipnóticos, Monokini, Sleepwalker, Astromato, The Butcher's Orquestra, Grenade, Wado, The Charts, Astronautas, Módulo, China and O Grito. The term Post-rock is already well used in Brazil.

Some magazines in the English language in the beginning of the 2000s deemed some worldwide genres like electronic rock (using this term on the 2000s music) and new rave having some Brazilian bands not only as the exponents but builders of these movements. 2015 was the first year in history that no songs by Brazilian rock acts were present at the list of the 100 most played songs on Brazilian radio, according to research carried out by Crowley Broadcast Analysis.

== 2010s ==
Wannabe Jalva is a space groove rock band formed in 2011 by Tiago Abrahão (guitar/bass/seq), Felipe Puperi (vocal/guitar), Rafael Rocha (vocal/guitar/bass) and Fernando Paulista (drums) in Porto Alegre, Brazil.

== See also ==
- Brazilian music
- Brazilian thrash metal
- Rock in São Paulo
- Latin Grammy Award for Best Brazilian Rock Album
- Música popular brasileira
- Punk in Brazil
- Samba rock
- Mangue Bit
- Tropicália
- Jovem Guarda
- Music of Brazil
- Electronic rock
- Psychedelic rock
- Punk rock
- New rave
