= Golden Boys (band) =

Brazilian doo-wop/rock band

Golden Boys is a Brazilian band formed in 1958, originally a doo-wop band, having influences also of rock and roll and Brazilian rock. They are composed of brothers Roberto, Ronaldo, and Renato Corrêa José Maria (members of Trio Esperança) and a cousin, Valdir Anunciação. Their first hit was "Meu Romance com Laura", followed in the next decades by "Michelle", "Se Eu Fosse Você", "Andança", "Mágoa", "Pensando Nela", and "O Cabeção". In 1971, Renato became a producer and left the group.

== Discography ==
year	Label	Album	Format
1958	Copacabana	The Golden Boys	78 rpm
1958	Copacabana	The Golden Boys	78 rpm
1959	Copacabana	Os Golden Boys	LP
1959	Copacabana	Os Golden Boys	78 rpm
1959	Copacabana	Os Golden Boys	Compac
1959	Copacabana	The Golden Boys	78 rpm
1960	Copacabana	The Golden Boys (with Betinho e seu conjunto)	Compact
1960	Copacabana	The Golden Boys	78 rpm
1961	Copacabana	The Golden Boys	78 rpm
1962	Copacabana	The Golden Boys	78 rpm
1963	Polydor	The Golden Boys	78 rpm
1963	Polydor	The Golden Boys	78 rpm
1964	Polydor	The Golden Boys	Compact
1964	Odeon	Golden Boys	Compact
1964	Odeon	Golden Boys	Compact
1965	Odeon	The Golden Boys	Compact
1965	Odeon	The Golden Boys	LP
1965	Odeon	The Golden Boys	Compact
1965	Odeon	The Golden Boys (with The Fevers)	Compact
1966	Odeon	Alguem na multidão (with The Fevers)	LP
1966	Odeon	The Golden Boys (with The Fevers)	Compact
1967	Odeon	Golden Boys	Compact
1967	Odeon	Pensando Nela	LP
1967	Odeon	Golden Boys	Compact
1967	Odeon	Golden Boys	Compact
1968	Odeon	Golden Boys	Compact
1968	Odeon	Golden Boys	Compact
1968	Odeon	Na linha de frente	LP
1968	Odeon	Golden Boys	Compact
1968	Odeon	Golden Boys	Compact
1969	Odeon	Golden Boys	Compact
1969	Odeon	Golden Boys	Compact
1969	Odeon	Golden Boys	LP
1969	Odeon	Golden Boys	Compact
1970	Odeon	Golden Boys	Compact
1970	Odeon	Golden Boys	Compact
1970	Odeon	FUMACÊ	LP
1970	Odeon	Golden Boys	Compact
1971	Odeon	Golden Boys	Compact
1971	Odeon	Golden Boys	Compact
1971	Odeon	Só vou criar galinha	LP
