= Ateu Psicodélico =

Studio album by Zé Ramalho
- Released: September 9, 2022
- Recorded: Second semester of 2022
- Studio: Robertinho de Recife studios in Rio de Janeiro
- Length: 51:00
- Label: Avôhai Music / Discobertas
- Producer: Robertinho de Recife

Zé Ramalho chronology
Sinais dos Tempos (2012)	Ateu Psicodélico (2022)

Singles from Ateu Psicodélico
- 1. "As Onze Palavras" Released: 19 August 2022

Ateu Psicodélico is the twentieth studio album by Brazilian singer-songwriter Zé Ramalho, released on 9 September 2022 via Avôhai Music in partnership with Discobertas. It's his first release of all-new material since Sinais dos Tempos (2012) and features guest performances by Waldonys, Andreas Kisser and Robertinho do Recife, the latter also acting as the album producer.

== Context, production and recording ==
"All music performed in Brazil is repetitive. There's nothing special about any of them. Romantic, every day themes or light digressions on politics or isolated cases are repetitive in almost every situation. Like Guilherme Arantes recently said: 'There's no more delirium in Brazilian music.' And I've been providing deliriums since album one. On the song Vila do Sossego, from first album, there's the sentence: 'And in the deliriums, to fear my grasshoppers'... With this I don't want to de-value those who don't deliriate when writing music. But it's a trigger that, when pulled, provokes reactions on whoever listens and hears deliriant songs. I repeat: I'm not criticizing, nor taking down any musical form of Brazilian music, but I'm referring to the passive behavior of all which are written."

— Zé Ramalho on Ateu Psicodélico

Zé Ramalho hadn't released any album of all-new material since 2012's Sinais dos Tempos. In the meantime, he re-organized his backing band and went through a couple of heart surgeries which imposed some recovering time. During two years of no live performances due to the COVID-19 pandemic, Ramalho revisited old notes and recordings with music ideas to create the new material. 13 songs were originally planned, but in the end 12 made it to the final cut, created in a two-month period of 2021. Ramalho, who wrote everything alone, defined the album as "100% by me, 100% new and 100% current".

The name of the album was taken off a text published on social media by Arnaldo Baptista (Os Mutantes) on Ramalho's own work. The text is reproduced on the back cover of the album and was originally posted a few months before the release.

The album was recorded at its producer Robertinho de Recife's studios in Rio de Janeiro, from April to June 2022.

== Release ==
The album was released on 9 September 2022 via Ramalho's own label, Avôhai Music, in partnership with Marcelo Fróes's label Discobertas. It was promoted by the single "As Onze Palavras", released on 19 August of the same year.

=== Critical reception ===
Professional ratings
Review scores
Source	Rating
G1	5/5 stars

On his blog on G1, Mauro Ferreira said that the first single, "As Onze Palavras", "honors the artist's past" and "serves the habitual banquet of mystical signs". Then, in his review of the whole album, he said Zé Ramalho "presents an already anthological album which evolves in high level from the first track to its last, serving a banquet of mystical signs" and that Ateu Psicodélico "is an album capable of converting any Christian who has faith in the regenerating power of music". He concluded by saying that "in the great trip through recurring themes of the catalogue of this messiah from Brejo do Cruz, Zé Ramalho goes far without leaving the place where he belongs since 1978".

On Radio Itatiaia's portal, Raphael Vidigal said that "the elaborate and apocalyptic vocabulary, taken off profane and sacred books, with a mythical aura which turns to the past to predict a future of an often fearsome dystopia, is back", but he considered the album not too surprising for repeating "this recipe which sounded original when he created it". He said Ramalho's voice "is in the same place, even lower, but without the same moving power, given the predictability of verses, sounds and notes" and criticized even the album cover, labeling its aspect "careless". He finished by admitting that's "all good" because the singer "presents xotes and rocks, speaks about love, sex, the soul of men and places inhabited by them, extracts the fine taste of sensations of that which the world cannot explain [...]."

== Track listing ==
All tracks are written by Zé Ramalho.

Ateu Psicodélico track listing
No.	Title	Length
1.	"As Onze Palavras" (The Eleven Words)	4:07
2.	"Beira-Mar, a Ressureição" (Near the Sea, the Resurrection)	6:50
3.	"Cópula" (Copulation)	3:38
4.	"O Diagrama da Alma Dourada" (The Golden Soul Diagram)	3:44
5.	"A Estrada de Tijolos Amarelos" (The Yellow Bricks Road)	4:05
6.	"Martelo Armagedon" (Armagedon Martelo (Note: "martelo" is a form of cordel literature.))	4:01
7.	"O Gosto Fino das Sensações" (The Fine Taste of Sensations)	4:07
8.	"O Que o Mundo Não Sabe Explicar" (What the World Cannot Explain)	4:09
9.	"Olhar Entorpecido" (Numb Look)	4:34
10.	"Repentista Marvel" (Marvel Repentista (Note: A repentista is a person who performs the repente, a Brazilian improvised singing style.))	3:49
11.	"Amanhecer Tantra" (Tantra Dawn)	4:01
12.	"Sextilhas Filosóficas" (Philosophical Sextillas)	3:55
Total length:		51:00

== Personnel ==
- Zé Ramalho – vocals on all tracks; viola on all tracks; acoustic guitar and base arrangements on all tracks except "Repentista Marvel"
- Robertinho de Recife – guitar on "Beira Mar, A Ressurreição", "Cópula" and "O Gosto Fino das Sensações"; ponteio viola on "Martelo Armagedon" and "Repentista Marvel"; arrangement on "Cópula" and "Repentista Marvel"
- Andreas Kisser — guitar on "Repentista Marvel"
- Rogério Fernandes – bass on all tracks except "Cópula" and "Repentista Marvel"
- Rob Endraus – bass on "Cópula" and "Repentista Marvel"; loops on "Repentista Marvel"
- Eduardo Constant – drums on all tracks except "Cópula" and "Repentista Marvel"
- Zé Gomes – percussion on all tracks
- Toti Cavalcanti – saxophone on "A Estrada de Tijolos Amarelos", "O Que o Mundo Não Sabe Explicar" and "Olhar Entorpecido"; brass and brass arrangement on "Amanhecer Tantra"
- Waldonys — accordion on "Martelo Armagedon" and "Amanhecer Tantra"
- Beto Brito – rebec on "Repentista Marvel"
- Vladimir Sousa – string arrangement and keyboards on "As Onze Palavras", "Beira Mar, A Ressurreição", "A Estrada de Tijolos Amarelos", "Olhar Entorpecido" and "Amanhecer Tantra"
- Dodô de Moraes – string arrangement and keyboards on "O Diagrama da Alma Dourada", "O Gosto Fino das Sensações", "O Que o Mundo Não Sabe Explicar" and "Sextilhas Filosóficas"

Technical personnel

- Robertinho de Recife — production, mixing and mastering
- Roberta Ramalho – executive producer
- Klebs Cavalcanti – production assistant
- Carlos Dias – production assistant and recording sessions pictures
- Leo Aversa – cover and booklet pictures
- Arnaldo Baptista – album title
