= A Cor do Som =

Brazilian musical group from Rio de Janeiro

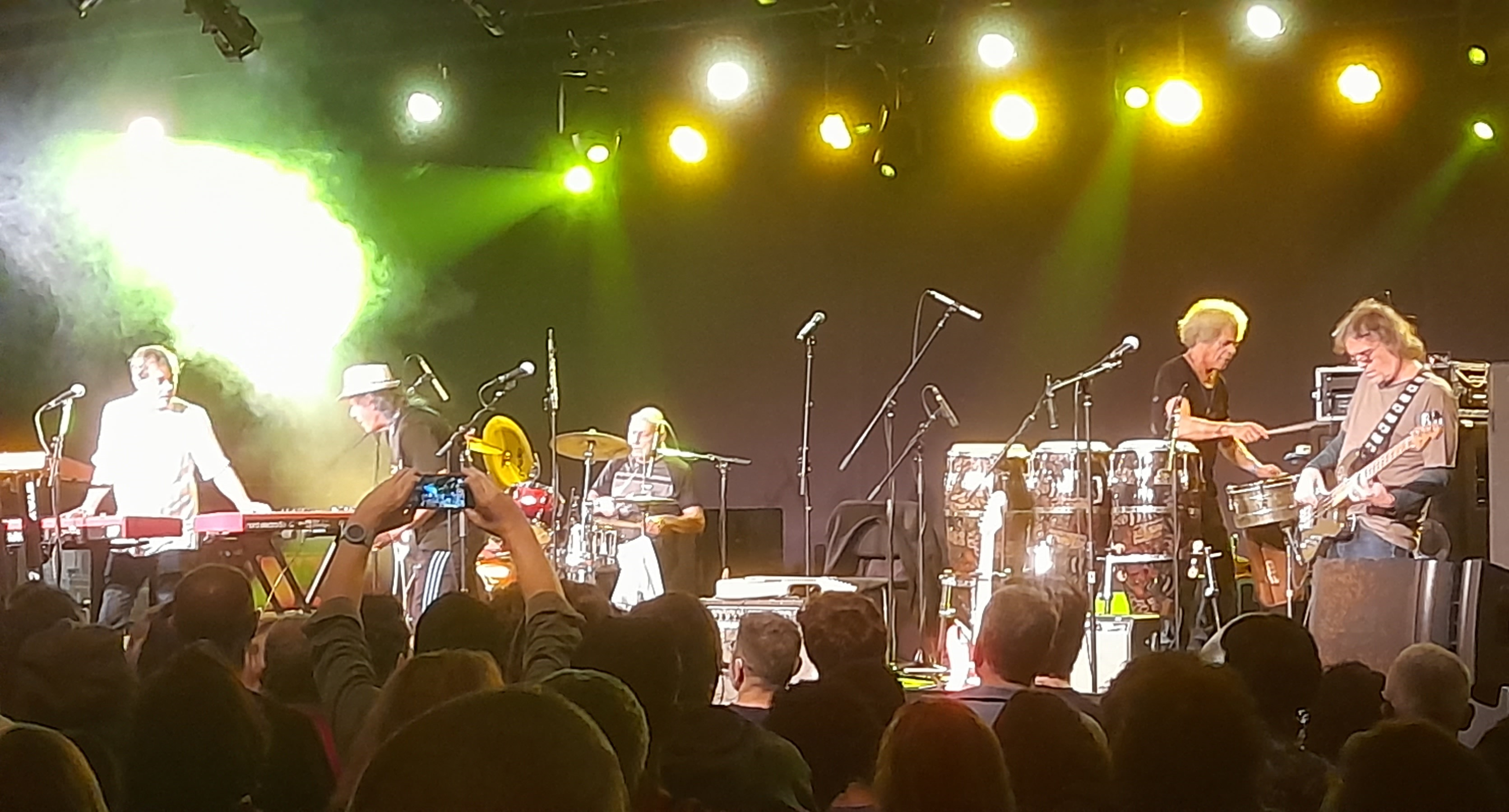
- The band live in São Paulo in 2023. From left to right: Mú Carvalho, Armandinho, Gustavo Schroeter, Ary Dias and Dadi Carvalho

Background information
- Origin: Rio de Janeiro, Rio de Janeiro, Brazil
- Genres: MPB; jazz; psychedelic rock; instrumental music; pop rock; classical music
- Years active: 1977–1987; 1994–1997; 2005–present
- Label: Warner Music
- Spinoff of: Novos Baianos
- Members: Mú Carvalho; Dadi Carvalho; Armandinho; Ary Dias; Gustavo Schroeter
- Past members: Victor Biglione; Perinho Santana; Jorginho Gomes; Didi Gomes
- Website: www.acordosom.com.br

A Cor do Som ("The Color of Sound") is a Brazilian musical group that spun off the backing band that supported Moraes Moreira following his departure from Novos Baianos. Originally this was the name of a side project of Novos Baianos itself which members lived together and experimented with music that blended elements, from Bahia state or samba, rock, frevo, choro and baião. The name of the group was suggested by Caetano Veloso and inspired by a song by Moreira and Luis Galvão.

== History ==
After a period working as a sub-group of Novos Baianos, A Cor do Som started to support Moraes Moreira in his solo career as a backing band in 1975. Later, by 1977, they started to work independently. They experimented with new sounds based on their experiences with Moreira and his fellow Novos Baianos member Pepeu Gomes.

In their debut, self-titled album (WEA 1977), the line-up was Dadi Carvalho (ex-Novos baianos and Jorge Ben) on the bass guitar, his brother Mú Carvalho (ex-A Banda do Zé Pretinho) on the keyboards, Gustavo Schroeter (ex-A Bolha) on the drums and Armandinho Macêdo (Trio Elétrico Armandinho, Dodô &amp; Osmar) on the guitar, bandolim and guitarra baiana. Dadi' and Mú's brother, Sérgio, was a producer at Polygram and tried to sign them up with the label, but the company felt their sound had little commercial appeal. Later, when André Midani founded WEA, they were called and signed up a three-year deal. They would go on and stay with the label for nine years, releasing a total of ten albums. A trio of percussionists supported the group in the recording sessions in São Paulo: Joãozinho, Nenê da Cuíca and Ary Dias. the latter joined them as a full-time member starting at their second, live album Ao Vivo em Montreux (1978). Back then, they were influenced by Yes, Nazareth, Santana, João Gilberto, The Rolling Stones, Egberto Gismonti, The Who, Gilberto Gil and Jethro Tull.

Mixing rock, regional rhythms and classical music, they were invited by Claude Nobs to Montreux Jazz Festival in Switzerland, becoming the first Brazilian group to perform in the event. Their show was almost entirely consisted of previously unreleased material and was recorded as a live album. They performed twice in the event. In the first night, to a younger audience, they were acclaimed. In the second, to an older audience, they were booed for not looking like a jazz band and not performing the genre whatsoever. The group wanted to keep the booing in the recording, anyway.

Starting with their third album, Frutificar, they started to sing following a request by the label. Three of their new, sung songs became hits: "Swingue Menina", "Abri a Porta" and "Beleza Pura".

Following Mudança de Estação (1981), Armandinho left the group to focus on his side project and solo career. He was then replaced with Victor Biglione, with whom they record Magia Tropical (1982) and As Quatro Fases do Amor (1983).

In the eighties, as BRock gained popularity via bands such as Blitz, RPM, Os Paralamas do Sucesso, Legião Urbana, Barão Vermelho and Titãs, the group lost some room in the market.

In 2005, the band reunited and recorded the live CD and DVD A Cor do Som Acústico, released in the following year.

In 2012, the albums A Cor do Som ao Vivo - Montreux International Jazz Festival and Frutificar were re-released as part of the Dose Dupla collection by Warner.

In 2017, the band celebrated their 40th anniversary with a new studio release and a national tour with their original line-up. Produced by Ricardo Feghali (who also performed as a pianist, programmer and arranger), the album featured two new songs and several re-recordings featuring Gilberto Gil, Roupa Nova, 14 Bis, Natiruts, Lulu Santos, Skank, Djavan and Moska.

In 2020 they digitally released Álbum Rosa, an entirely instrumental album with eight re-recordings and two new songs. In the following year, it won the Lating Grammy Award for Best Portuguese Language Rock or Alternative Album. The album cover, created by Batman Zavareze and based on two works by Dadi and Mú, is a questioning of the dogma of blue being for boys and pink being for girls.

== Discography ==
- 1977: A Cor do Som, Atlantic, LP.
- 1978: A Cor do Som - Ao vivo no Montreux International Jazz Festival, Atlantic, LP.
- 1979: Frutificar, Atlantic, LP.
- 1980: Transe Total, Atlantic, LP.
- 1981: Mudança de Estação, Elektra, LP.
- 1982: Magia Tropical, Elektra, LP.
- 1983: As quatro fases do amor, Elektra, LP.
- 1984: Intuição, Elektra, LP.
- 1985: O Som da Cor, Elektra, LP.
- 1986: Gosto do Prazer, RCA Victor, LP.
- 1996: A Cor do Som ao vivo no Circo, MoviePlay, CD.
- 2006: A Cor do Som Acústico, Performance/Sony, CD e DVD
- 2018: A Cor do Som 40 Anos, Boogie Woogie Music/Altafonte
- 2021: Álbum Rosa, Boogie Woogie Music/Altafonte
