= Serguei (singer) =

Brazilian singer

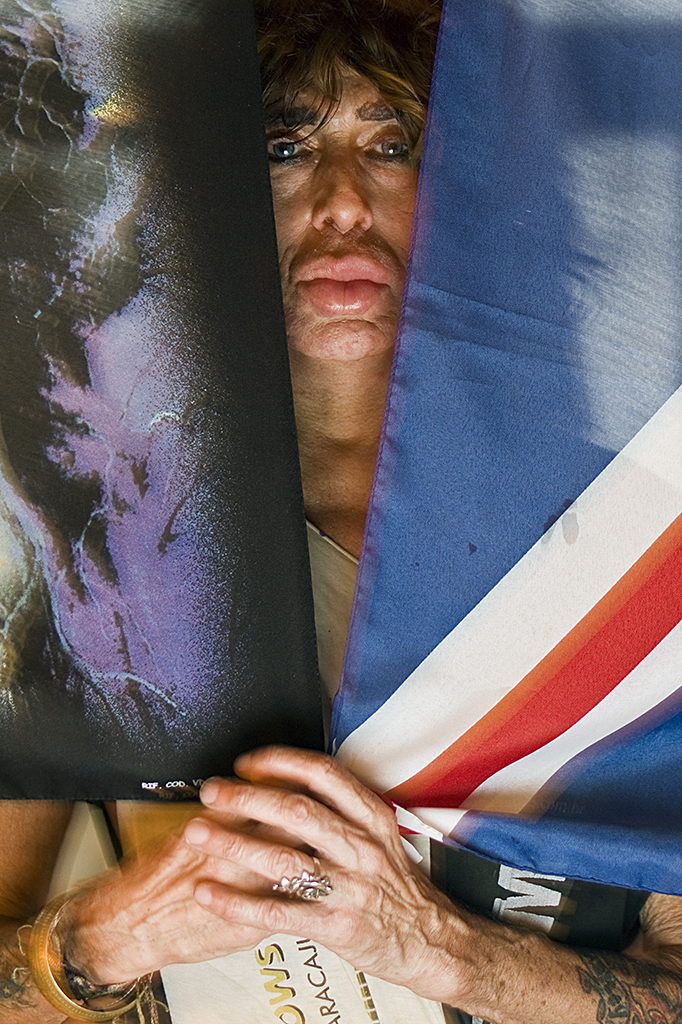
Serguei

Sérgio Augusto Bustamante (8 November 1933 – 7 June 2019), better known as Serguei, was a Brazilian singer and composer. According to Cravo Albin, although he never achieved major commercial success, he is considered a legend of Brazilian rock and also the Brazilian pioneer of the androgynous look in performances.

== Biography ==
Born in the city of Rio de Janeiro, he was the only son of an IBM executive, Domingos Bustamante, and a housewife, Maria. In the 1990s, Serguei regularly visited Dona Maria, who still had her apartment in Barra da Tijuca. As a child, he had a Russian friend who called him "Sergei" (Сергей, a variation of "Sérgio" in Russian) due to pronunciation difficulties, and he eventually adopted that version as his stage name.

== Career ==
According to Serguei himself, his musical career began in June 1951, when he performed his first show "at a São João party, at 18 years old", as he recalled in an interview. He later returned to the United States where he continued his career by participating in student festivals.

In the mid-1960s, Serguei began gaining recognition in Brazil singing with the band Os Jovens, one of Roberto Carlos's backing bands. In 1967, he was featured by *Intervalo* magazine (being called the "hallucinated singer") in the middle of Avenida Rio Branco where he staged a hippie protest carrying a sign that read:

In 1969, he was present at the famous Woodstock Festival, and later that same year, the singer—who identified as pansexual— claimed to have had an affectionate relationship with American singer Janis Joplin in Long Island. This alleged relationship contributed to his fame, though the singer made contradictory chronological claims in interviews; there is no way to confirm it, as the singer died in 1970.

In 2016, the documentary *Serguei, the Last Psychedelic* premiered, telling his life story.

Considered the oldest rocker in Brazil, Serguei performed with his band Pandemonium, which accompanied him from 2008 until his death. He was also considered the official singer of the Hells Angels (international motorcycle club).

In his home in the city of Saquarema, the "Temple of Rock" was created, managed by Serguei, consisting of clothing, records, awards, books, posters, VHS tapes, and other rock music materials documenting the singer's life. His residence became a tourist attraction in the city. The house was built by entrepreneur and environmentalist Russell Wid Coffin on land donated by the city in 2006 and received over 20,000 visitors.
