= My Name Is Baghdad =

2020 Brazilian film

- Portuguese: Meu nome é Bagdá
- Directed by: Caru Alves de Souza
- Written by: Caru Alves de Souza; Josefina Trotta
- Based on: Bagda, o Skatista by Toni Brandão
- Produced by: Caru Alves de Souza
- Starring: Grace Orsato; Karina Buhr
- Cinematography: Camila Cornelsen
- Edited by: Willem Dias
- Music by: Will Robson
- Production companies: Manjericão Filmes; Tangerina Entretenimento
- Distributed by: Wayna Pitch
- Release date: 29 January 2020 (Berlin)
- Running time: 99 minutes
- Country: Brazil
- Language: Portuguese

My Name Is Baghdad (Portuguese: Meu nome é Bagdá) is a Brazilian coming-of-age drama film, directed by Caru Alves de Souza and released in 2020. Adapted from Toni Brandão's young adult novel Bagda, o Skatista, the film stars Grace Orsato as Bagdá, a teenage girl in São Paulo whose status as a misfit in the city's predominantly male skateboarding community is transformed for the better when she finally meets a group of female skateboarders with whom she doesn't have to downplay her femininity to be accepted.

The cast also includes Karina Buhr, Gilda Nomacce and Paulette Pink.

The film premiered in the Generation 14Plus at the 70th Berlin International Film Festival, where it was named the winner of the Grand Prix of the International Jury.
