= Fluminense FM =

Niterói; Brazil
- Frequency: 94.9 MHz

Programming
- Language: Portuguese

Ownership
- Owner: Grupo O Fluminense

History
- First air date: 1972
- Last air date: 2005

Rádio Fluminense FM was a Brazilian radio station based in Niterói, in the Rio de Janeiro Metropolitan Area. The station broadcast on 94.9 MHz and was controlled by the Grupo O Fluminense. Nicknamed "A Maldita" ("The Damned"), it was described by journalist Maria Estrella as "the gateway to Brazilian rock in the 80s." The station helped popularize rock music in Brazil and boosted the careers of Brazilian bands such as Legião Urbana, Barão Vermelho, Blitz, Kid Abelha, Biquini Cavadão, and Paralamas do Sucesso.

== History ==
On February 15, 1954, lawyer and journalist Alberto Francisco Torres acquired the newspaper O Fluminense, the fourth oldest newspaper still in circulation in Brazil, initiating the construction of a media conglomerate. In 1972, Rádio Fluminense FM was launched with a programming focus on horse racing, broadcasting races from the Hipódromo da Gávea. Between races, it played music.

In 1981, two journalist friends, Luiz Antônio Mello and Samuel Wainer Filho, began a project to reformat the radio station, proposing a rock program called Rock Alive. Although it didn't please one of the evaluators, it was not only approved but also transformed into a 24-hour rock station. On March 1, 1982, the new Fluminense FM went on air, innovating with an exclusively female team of hosts and a no-repeat music policy. Regarding the female hosts, Mello said in an interview that "since the programming was heavy, we needed soft voices to announce it."

Despite its success in popularizing Brazilian rock and promoting unknown bands, the station faced severe financial problems because it did not air advertisements and had a precarious technical structure. Its staff struggled with low salaries and a lack of resources. For example, some performances by international artists, such as Steve Hackett, could not even be recorded due to a lack of tape. Furthermore, well-established pop radio stations, such as Rádio Cidade and Transamérica, began incorporating rock into their programming, along with some shows that imitated Fluminense FM's profile. However, the station had cemented its status in the Brazilian rock world, and many bands dreamed of having their demo tapes played on the radio.

In 1990, the station became pop, and in 1991, it returned to rock. However, influenced by MTV Brasil and 89 FM, it began featuring a hit-parade rock repertoire and pop-style hosting instead of promoting unknown bands as it had done before. On September 30, 1994, the station permanently abandoned rock, becoming an affiliate of Jovem Pan FM and changed its name to Jovem Pan 2 FM Rio de Janeiro, and in 2000, it changed its name once again to Jovem Rio. In mid-2005, Grupo O Fluminense entered into a partnership with Grupo Bandeirantes de Comunicação to launch BandNews FM Rio de Janeiro, bringing an end to the radio station. In 2018, the station's frequency was sold to Comunidade Cristã Paz e Vida and began broadcasting as Feliz FM Rio de Janeiro.

== In popular culture ==
In 1992, Luiz Antônio Mello published the book A Onda Maldita, and Maria Estrella published, in 2006, the book Rádio Fluminense FM: a porta de entrada do rock brasileiro nos anos 80 (Radio Fluminense FM: The Gateway to Brazilian Rock in the 80s). Both books tell the story of the radio station.

In 2007, the director and screenwriter Tetê Mattos released the short film A Maldita, based on the book by Luiz Antonio Mello, featuring people and listeners from Fluminense FM sharing stories and memories from its peak period in the 1980s until its end in the early 1990s. Later, the short film was expanded into a documentary, which was released at the Festival do Rio in 2019.

In 2024, the film Aumenta que É Rock 'n Roll premiered, a comedy directed by Tomas Portella loosely inspired by the pioneering role of the radio station in the rock segment.
