= Bixo da Seda =

Brazilian rock band from Porto Alegre

- Origin: Porto Alegre, Rio Grande do Sul, Brazil
- Genres: Rock, psychedelic rock, progressive rock
- Years active: 1967–1972; 1973–1980 occasional reunions for shows
- Labels: Phonogram (via Polydor), GEL (via Continental)
- Members: Marcelo Guimarães; Marcelo Truda; Mimi Lessa; Marcos Lessa; Edinho Espíndola
- Past members: Fughetti Luz; Wilmar Ignácio Seade Santana; Zé Vicente Brizola; Cláudio Vera Cruz; Renato Ladeira

Bixo da Seda (formerly known as Liverpool and then Liverpool Sound) was a Brazilian rock band formed in Porto Alegre in 1967.

After participating in some festivals, they moved to Rio de Janeiro after signing up with a major label. They recorded one studio album (Por Favor, Sucesso) and some singles, but broke up in 1972. One year later, they returned and moved to Rio once again, where they recorded their second, self-titled album. They also started to tour Brazil. In 1980, they broke up again due to financial woes. From the end of the 1990s onward, they would reunite several other times.

== History ==
=== Liverpool ===
The band was formed in 1967 in Vila do IAPI, a working-class neighborhood in Porto Alegre by Fughetti Luz (vocals), Mimi Lessa (lead guitar), Marcos Lessa (rhythm guitar), Wilmar Ignácio Seade Santana (bass) - also known as Peco or Pepeco, and Edson Espíndola (drums). Initially, they played covers in clubs all over the state of Rio Grande do Sul, focusing on bands such as the Beatles, the Rolling Stones and the Who. In the following year, they were invited by Carlinhos Hartlieb to perform his song "Por Favor, Sucesso" at the II Festival Universitário da Música Popular Brasileira music festival in Porto Alegre, which served as a qualifying stage for the IV Festival Internacional da Canção in Rio de Janeiro. The song would eventually win the contest and they headed to Rio, where they didn't make it to the finals, but landed a deal with Equipe, a small local label.

In 1969, they recorded their debut album, Por Favor, Sucesso, containing songs by Carlinhos Hartlieb and Hermes Aquino & Laís Marques, besides some of their own. The album was influenced by Tropicália and psychedelic rock. Besides this album, they also released some singles. The album would be re-released internationally in the 21st century, allowing them to develop a minor cult following comparable to that of Os Mutantes. In 1970, they were invited to record the soundtrack of Marcelo Zona Sul, a movie by Xavier de Oliveira. In 1971, their deal expired and they released another single under the name Liverpool Sound via Polydor, under license of Phonogram: "Hei Menina" and "Fale"; its side A was a hit. In the same year, they were featured on TV Globo's Som Livre Exportação. In 1972, the band called its quits. Fughetti got married and moved abroad, Peco traveled across the country and the rest of the band returned to Porto Alegre.

=== Bixo da Seda ===
Starting in 1973, the former members of Liverpool - except for Fughetti Luz - began a reunion and change the group's name to Bixo da Seda after a suggestion by guitarist Zé Vicente Brizola, who was a part of the band together with keyboardist Cláudio Vera Cruz. Around the same time, Fughetti, who had returned to Porto Alegre and lead a few short-lived bands such as Laranja Mecânica, Bobo da Corte and Trilha do Sol, was invited to return as a vocalist. In 1975, they moved to Rio de Janeiro and performed several times there and in São Paulo and Belo Horizonte. Peco, Zé Vicente Brizola and Cláudio Vera Cruz left the band before it moved and were replaced with keyboardist Renato Ladeira, a former member of A Bolha, and Marcos Lessa, who took over the bass. With this line-up, they recorded a self-titled album released via GEL under license of Continental. The album's sound was closer to that of progressive rock groups such as Yes, Genesis, King Crimson and Pink Floyd. In the following years, they performed across the whole country. However, in 1980, the group called its quits again due to being financially unable to afford a life in Rio.

=== Later reunions ===
The members would reunite in several occasions, always without an ill Fughetti Luz and with Marcelo Guimarães on the vocals and Marcelo Truda on the guitar.

== Members ==
=== Liverpool and Liverpool Sound ===
- Fughetti Luz: vocals
- Mimi Lessa: lead guitar
- Marcos Lessa: rhythm guitar
- Peco ou Pepeco (Wilmar Ignácio Seade Santana): bass
- Edson Espíndola: drums

=== Bixo da Seda ===
First line-up

- Mimi Lessa: lead guitar and vocals
- Zé Vicente Brizola: rhythm guitar and vocals
- Marcos Lessa: rhythm guitar and vocals
- Cláudio Vera Cruz: keyboard and vocals
- Peco or Pepeco (Wilmar Ignácio Seade Santana): bass and vocals
- Edson Espíndola: drums and vocals

Album line-up

- Fughetti Luz: vocals
- Mimi Lessa: guitar and vocals
- Renato Ladeira: keyboard and vocals
- Marcos Lessa: bass and vocals
- Edson Espíndola: drums and vocals

== Discography ==
=== Studio albums ===
Year	Title	Label	Notes
1969	Por Favor, Sucesso	Equipe	as Liverpool
1976	Bixo da Seda	Gravações Elétricas S.A. via Continental	-

=== Singles ===
Year	Title	Label	Note
1969	Liverpool	Equipe	as Liverpool
1970	Marcelo Zona Sul	Equipe	as Liverpool

=== Singles ===
Year	Title	Label	Notes
1969	Por Favor, Sucesso / Olhai os Lírios dos Campos	Equipe	as Liverpool
1971	Hei Menina / Fale	Phonogram, através do selo Polydor	as Liverpool Sound

=== Guest appearances ===
Year	Title	Label	Note
1976	Som Tropical	GEL, via Continental	-
1993	A Música de Porto Alegre - Rock	Independent	-
