= A Peleja do Diabo com o Dono do Céu =

Studio album by Zé Ramalho
- Released: September 1979
- Recorded: June 1979
- Studio: Estúdios CBS, Rio de Janeiro
- Genre: Forró
- Length: 38:48; 52:10 (Remastered version)
- Label: Epic (CBS – Sony Music)
- Producer: Carlos Alberto Sion

Zé Ramalho chronology
Zé Ramalho (1978)	A Peleja do Diabo com o Dono do Céu (1979)	A Terceira Lâmina (1981)

A Peleja do Diabo com o Dono do Céu (also known as Zé Ramalho II) is the second solo album by Brazilian musician Zé Ramalho, released in 1979.

It was his first gold record and it depicts a singer who sees life through a Manichaeist optic according to which everything is about God or the Devil.

== Song information ==
"Admirável Gado Novo", which translates as "Brave New Cattle", mentions ideas from Brave New World, by Aldous Huxley, and reflects on the contradictions of a massified capitalist society under an authoritarian rule.

In 1996, the song was featured in the telenovela O Rei do Gado's soundtrack (which sold 2 million copies) as the theme song of the landless workers. Indeed, Ramalho wrote it thinking of the Northeastern population of Brazil, which would cross dry lands in search of work and better conditions.

The song is based on baião instrumentation and has a chorus in the form of aboio (a chant by rural workers who handle cattle). The verse "êh, ô, vida de gado" (hey, oh, cattle life) had already been used in other songs such as "Toada de Gado" (written by Vavá Machado and Arlindo Marcolino and performed by Quinteto Violado) and, in this song, it becomes a metaphor for the people's lives in general.

"Falas do Povo", which has social critiques and features Jorge Mautner on the violin, was dedicated to Geraldo Vandré, one of Ramalho's influences. "Beira-Mar" is a galope à beira-mar (a type of poetry derivative of the martelo agalopado) and it marks the beginning of a trilogy that continues on "Beira-Mar – Capítulo II" (from 1982's A Força Verde) and ends on "Beira-Mar – Capítulo Final" (from 1998's Eu Sou Todos Nós). The lyrics come from a cordel work written by Ramalho in 1977 and titled "Apocalypse". The first part of this text would later appear on "Canção Agalopada", a song from his next album A Terceira Lâmina (1981).

"Agônico" is an instrumental track in which Ramalho plays all instruments (violas, bass, percussion, drum, piano, pandeiro and voice effects). Named by Mautner, the track would be later re-released with lyrics on the 1998 album Eu Sou Todos Nós, then titled "Agônico - O Canto". Ramalho believes the track to be representative of the similarities that, according to him, exist between music from Northeastern Brazil and music of the Moors, the latter having influenced the former with the arrival of the Portuguese, whose territory had been invaded by North African peoples centuries before.

"Frevo Mulher" was initially composed for the repertoire of Ramalho's then wife Amelinha, who co-sings with him on "Pelo Vinho e Pelo Pão".

== Cover ==
The album cover depicts Zé Ramalho holding an acoustic guitar and impersonating the "owner of Heaven", while a vampiresque woman (Xuxa Lopes) lurks him from behind and his rival José Mojica Marins threatens him. The picture was taken in an abandoned building in Santa Teresa, Rio de Janeiro, and was directed by Ivan Cardoso. In the rest of the booklet, Satã (producer and José Mojica's bodyguard), Mônica Schmidt and Hélio Oiticica; illustrations by Seth (Álvaro Marins); and symbols by Raul Córdula can also be seen.

== Reception ==
The AllMusic review by Alvaro Neder awarded the album 4 1/2 stars stating "More open to pop culture than his predecessors, he brings in this release some of his biggest hits such as "Admirável Gado Novo" and "Frevo mulher" in which northeastern folkloric rhythms/melodies/instruments coexist with contemporary grooves and musical treatments. But it never slips to the muddy trail of easy commercial cliché.".

Professional ratings
Review scores
Source	Rating
AllMusic	4.5/5 stars

== Track listing ==
All songs by Zé Ramalho.

1. A Peleja do Diabo com o Dono do Céu (The Devil's Fight with the Owner of Heaven) – 4:24
2. Admirável Gado Novo (Brave New Cattle) – 4:53
3. Falas do Povo (Speeches of the People) – 4:11
4. Beira-Mar (Near the Sea) – 3:54
5. Garoto de Aluguel (Taxi Boy) (Boy for rent (Taxi Boy)) – 3:03
6. Pelo Vinho e Pelo Pão (For the Wine and for the Bread) – 3:19
7. Mote das Amplidões (Motto of the Amplidãos) – 3:57
8. Jardim das Acácias (Garden of the Acacias) – 5:10
9. Agônico (Agonic) – 1:43
10. Frevo Mulher (Woman Frevo) – 3:38

=== 2003 Re-issue ===
1. Admirável Gado Novo (instrumental) – 4:49
2. Mr. Tambourine Man – 2:26
3. Hino Amizade (Friendship Anthem) – 3:06
4. O Desafio do Século (The Challenge of the Century) – 3:41

== Personnel ==
- Zé Ramalho – lead vocals, acoustic guitar, all instruments on "Agônico" (bass guitar, percussion, viola, pandeiro, piano, drum, lead vocals)
- Elber Bedaque – drums on "Jardim das Acácias"
- Pepeu Gomes — electric guitar on "Jardim das Acácias"
- Jorge Mautner — violin on "Falas do Povo"
- Geraldo Azevedo — twelve-string guitar on "Admirável Gado Novo"
