= Dr. Silvana & Cia. =

Brazilian rock band

- Origin: Rio de Janeiro, Brazil
- Genres: Rock
- Years active: 1984-present
- Members: Ricardo Zimetbaum; Cícero Pestana; Jorge Soledade; Edu

Dr. Silvana & Cia. is a Brazilian rock musical band, formed in Rio de Janeiro.

== Career ==
Dr. Silvana & Cia. was formed in 1984 by Ricardo Zimetbaum, Cícero Pestana, Jorge Soledade and Edu, in Rio de Janeiro. They are known in Brazil for their humorous and double entendre lyrics

The band recorded the single Eh! Oh! for CBS in 1984 and the album Dr. Silvana & Cia. for CBS. Two songs from the album were hits Serão Extra and Taca a Mãe pra Ver se Quica.

In 1985, the band was featured in the compilation album Que delícia de Rock, recorded by CBS. In 1989, the group recorded Ataca Outra Vez, their second album. Other albums are A Vingança (1993) and Choco, Choco, Chocolate (2005). Nowadays the band has a new lineup and performs around Brazil in 1980s revival events.

== Current members ==
- Cícero Pestana - guitar
- Vagner Beraldo - bass
- Maurício Mello - percussion

== Original line-up ==
- Ricardo Zimetbaum - lead vocals
- Cícero Pestana - guitar
- Jorge Soledade - bass (died on 27 May 2010, from respiratory failure after an aorta surgery in Hospital Pedro Ernesto in Vila Isabel
- Edu - percussion

Ricardo Zimetbaum left the band to pursue a solo career. He also took part of the band The Musicians with Fabricio "Leonardo Leo" (guitar) and Marcelo Penteado (bass) between 1993 and 1994.

== Discography ==
- 1984 - Eh! Oh! (compact) - CBS
- 1985 - Dr. Silvana & Cia - CBS
- 1987 - Tide - CBS
- 1989 - Ataca Outra Vez - RGE
- 1993 - A Vingança - RPG
- 2005 - Choco, Choco, Chocolate - Selesom

== See also ==
- Brazilian rock
- Música popular brasileira
