= Armandinho (Brazilian guitarist) =

Brazilian composer and singer

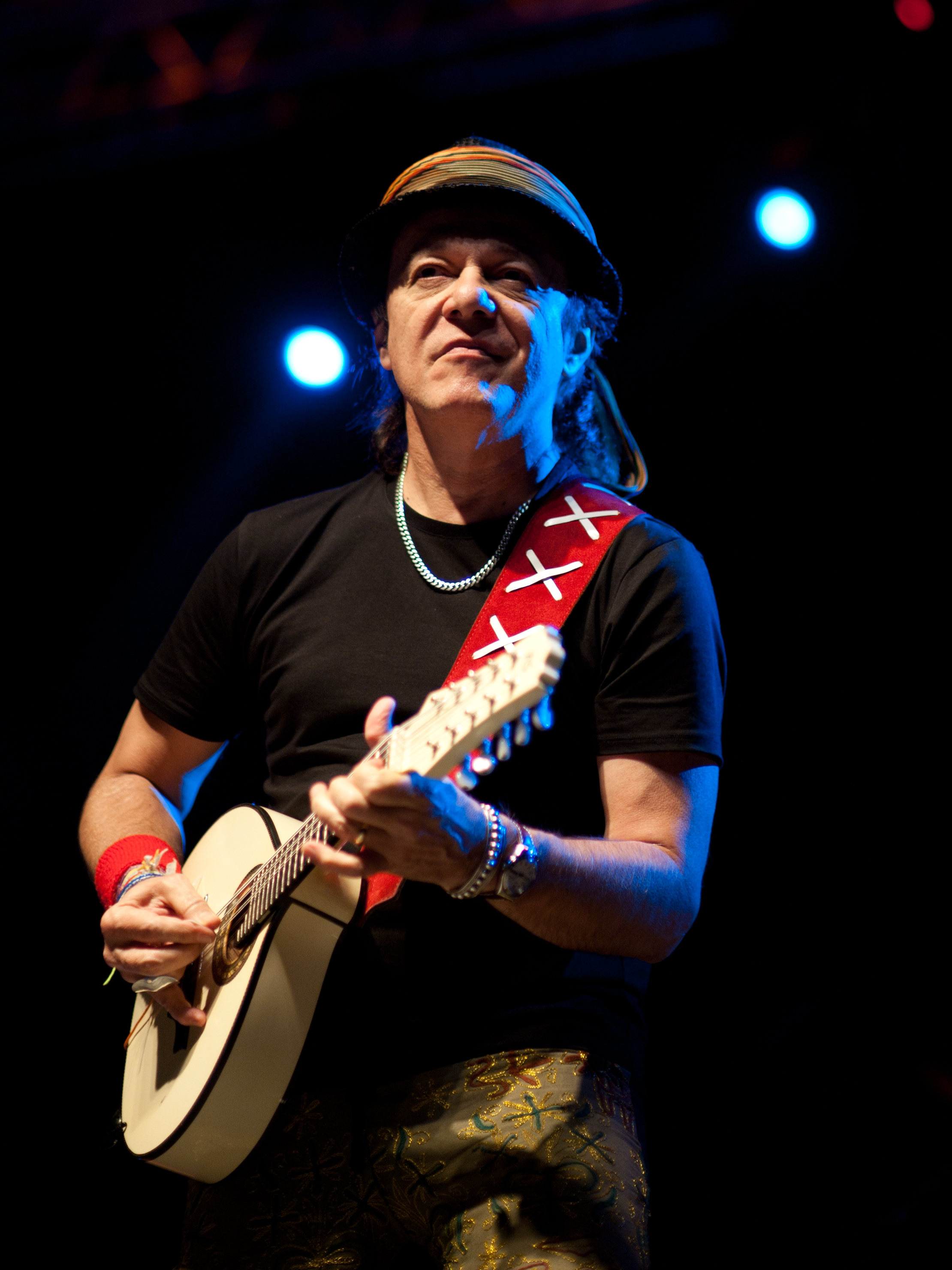
- Armandinho playing a 10-string bandolim

Background information
- Born: Armando da Costa Macêdo; May 22, 1953 (age 73)
- Origin: Salvador, Bahia, Brazil
- Genres: MPB, choro, frevo, rock, pop, jazz
- Instruments: Electric guitar, mandolin, vocals, acoustic guitar
- Labels: EMI-Odeon Records, WMG, Abril Music
- Website: www.armandinho.com

Armandinho (born Armando da Costa Macêdo, May 23, 1953) is a Brazilian composer and singer. He was born in Salvador, the son of Osmar Macêdo, from the world's first trio elétrico, the Trio Elétrico de Dodô e Osmar. (In the 1940s, at the same time the electric guitar was invented, Osmar Macêdo along with bandmate Adolfo Nascimento [who was an electrical engineer] independently created the Guitarra Baiana, a type of electric cavaquinho, which gave the Trio Elétrico its name.) In his early career, he played in his bands Trio Elétrico Mirim in 1962 and Hell's Angels in 1967.

In 1977, he formed A Cor do Som with bassist/vocalist Dadi, keyboardist/vocalist Mú Carvalho, percussionist/vocalist Ary Dias and drummer Gustavo Schroeter. They performed in Montreux Jazz Festival had some hits with "Beleza pura" (Caetano Veloso), "Abri a porta" (Gilberto Gil/Dominguinhos), "Zanzibar" (Armandinho/Fausto Nilo), etc.

Since then, Armandinho has recorded and performed with musicians such as Raphael Rabello, Paulo Moura, Época de Ouro, Moraes Moreira, Pepeu Gomes, as well as his own group, the Trio Elétrico de Armandinho.

== Discography ==
=== Solo albums ===
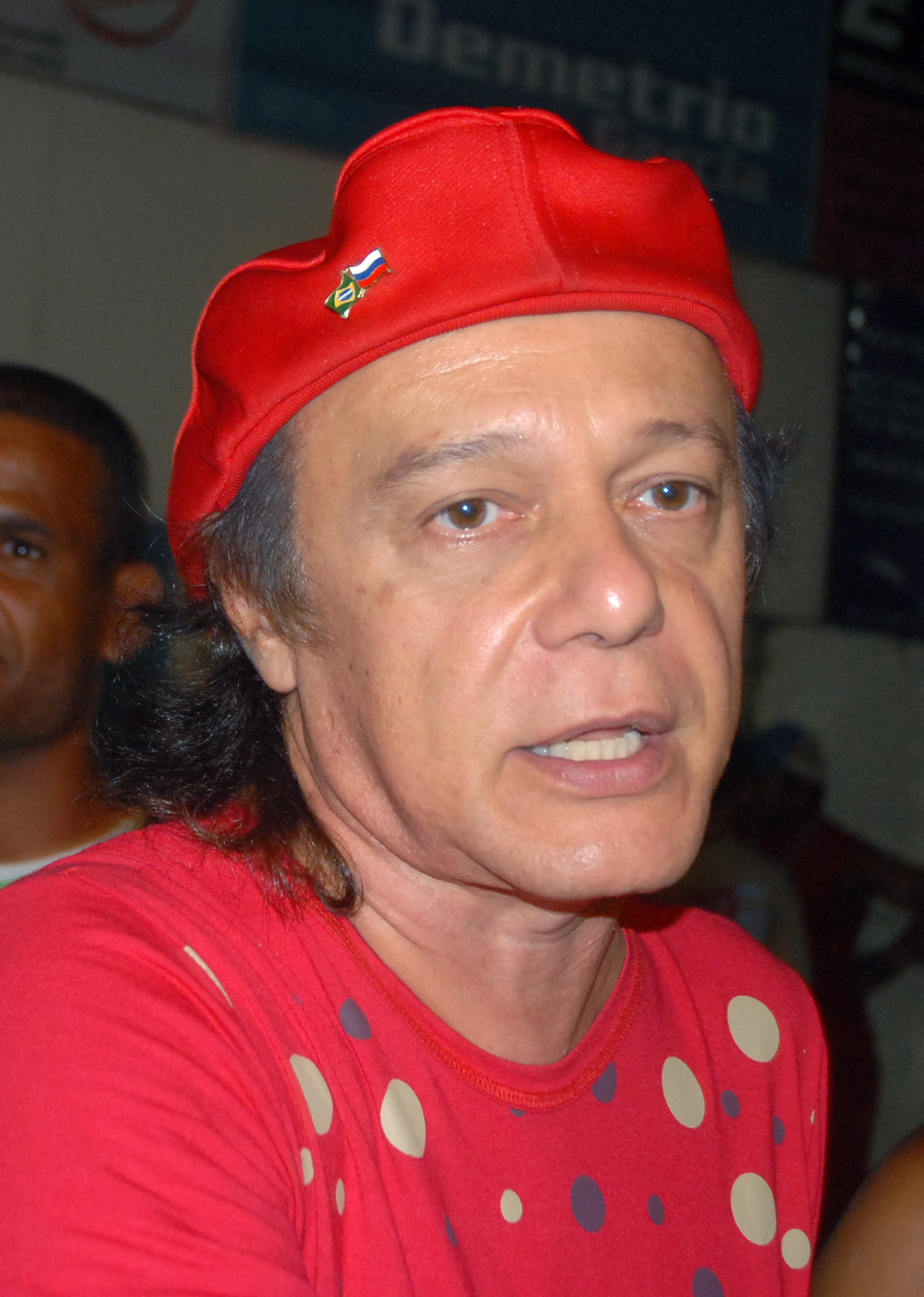

- 1983 – Armandinho e o Trio Elétrico de Dodô e Osmar
- 1989 – Brasileirô (Movie Records)
- 1993 – Instrumental no CBB – Época de Ouro e Armandinho
- 1996 – Brasil Musical – Série Música Viva – Armandinho e Raphael Rabello
- 1997 – O Melhor do Chorinho Ao Vivo – Armandinho e Época de Ouro
- 1997 – Raphael Rabello e Armandinho – Em Concerto
- 1999 – Retocando o Choro
- 2001 – Caetano & Gil
- 2003 – Retocando o Choro Ao Vivo (Biscoito Fino)
- 2009 – Pop Choro
- 2009 – Paulo Moura e Armandinho – Afrobossanova
