= Paêbirú =

Studio album by Lula Côrtes and Zé Ramalho
- Released: 1975
- Recorded: 1974
- Genre: Folk, Psychedelic rock
- Length: 55:30
- Label: Shadoks Music

Lula Côrtes chronology
Satwa (w/Laílson) (1973)	Paêbirú (1975)	Rosa de Sangue (1980)

Zé Ramalho chronology
Paêbirú (w/Lula Côrtes) (1975)	Zé Ramalho (1977)

Professional ratings
Review scores
Source	Rating
Allmusic	(4.5/5)
Stylus Magazine	A−
PopMatters	(9/10)

Paêbirú is an album by Brazilian artists Lula Côrtes and Zé Ramalho. The album was originally released in 1975 and reissued in 2005 on Shadoks Music and later on by Mr. Bongo UK, in a very high quality Vinyl and CD Edition.

Allegedly, almost all of the original copies of the album were destroyed in a river flood, making it incredibly hard to find. A copy of this LP may worth R$15.000,00 (about US$7,500.00) Zé Ramalho doesn't consider it as a work by him, so much that he is celebrating 35 years of career in 2012 (which marks 35 years of the release of his first solo album), and not in 2010. Since its reissue, it has been widely acknowledged as a lost gem of the Brazilian psychedelic movement of the 1960s and 1970s.

== Track listing ==
1. "Trilha de Sumé" (Córdula, Côrtes, Ramalho) – 6:30
2. "Culto à Terra" (Côrtes, Ramalho) – 2:11
3. "Bailado das Muscarias" (Côrtes, Ramalho) – 4:34
4. "Harpa Dos Ares" (Côrtes, Ramalho) – 4:01
5. "Não Existe Molhado Igual Ao Pranto" (Côrtes, Ramalho) – 7:30
6. "Omm" (Côrtes, Ramalho) – 6:03
7. "Raga Dos Raios" (Côrtes, Ramalho) – 2:30
8. "Nas Paredes de Pedra Encantada" (Alagoano, Ramalho) –7:33
9. "Marácas de Fogo" (Côrtes, Ramalho) – 2:34
10. "Louvação a Iemanjá" (Côrtes, Ramalho) – 1:53
11. "Regato da Montanha" (Côrtes, Ramalho) – 3:24
12. "Beira Mar" (Côrtes, Ramalho) – 1:39
13. "Pedra Templo Animal" (Côrtes, Ramalho) – 4:15
14. "Trilha de Sumé" (Côrtes, Ramalho) – 2:04

== Personnel ==
- Bass - Carmelo
- Additional Production, Electric Guitar - Don Tronxo
- Additional Music - Fernando Lira
- Guitar - Ivinho
- Berimbau - Jarbas Selenita
- Flute - Jonathas
- Choir/Chorus - Lailson
- Composer - Linha Em Nagô
- Additional Production, Arranger, Bass, Bongos, Composer, Congas, Coro, Effects, Guitar, Electric Guitar, Harp, Percussion, Primary Artist, Sound Effects, Special Effects, Trumpet, Violin - Lula Côrtes
- Choir/Chorus, Coro, Percussion - Marconi
- Bass - Paulo Raphael
- Composer - Raul Cordula
- Piano, Violin - Toni Torres
- Bombo, Vocals - Zé De Torubamba
- Additional Music, Afoxe, Arranger, Bass, Choir/Chorus, Composer, Congas, Contrabass, Coro, Effects, Guitar, Percussion, Piano, Primary Artist, Soloist, Special Effects, Viola, Bass Violin, Vocals - Zé Ramalho
