= Comadre Florzinha =

Brazilian musical group

- Also known as: Comadre Fulorzinha; Comadre Fulozinha
- Origin: Recife, Pernambuco, Brazil
- Genres: Maracatu, Coco, Ciranda, Baião
- Years active: 1997-present
- Members: Karina Buhr; Mairah Rocha; Flávia Maia; Letícia Coura; Marcelo Monteiro
- Past members: Isaar França; Renata Mattar; Telma César; Alessandra Leão; Maria Helena

Comadre Florzinha, also known as Comadre Fulorzinha or Comadre Fulozinha, is a Brazilian group formed by Karina Buhr (vocals, percussion and rebec), Mairah Rocha (vocals, harmonica and percussion), Flávia Maia (vocals and percussion), Marcelo Monteiro (saxophone and flute) and Letícia Coura (vocals, cavaquinho and acoustic guitar). The band was created in Recife, Pernambuco and became famous for recording several rhythms of that region and contributing to spreading the culture of that state.

== History ==
Comadre Florzinha was created in 1997, by its leader Karina Buhr. The first lineup of the group was Buhr (vocals, percussion and rebec), Isaar França (vocals, percussion and harmonica), Renata Mattar, Telma César, Alessandra Leão and Maria Helena. All the members were very experienced musician and had a large knowledge about culture of Pernambuco. Based on this influence, the group create its own style of making music, giving prominence to percussion instruments and female vocals. However, other instruments are also used during its songs.

In 1998 and 1999, the band played with Antonio Nóbrega, recording with him on the album Pernambuco falando para o mundo. They also played with many other important artists of the state, such as DJ Dolores and Mundo Livre S/A. In 1999, Comadre Florzinha recorded its debut eponymously-titled album. In 2001, the band started its first world tour and participated of many important festivals, such as La Voix des Pays and Calgary Folk Music Festival. In 2003, the band recorded its second album, Tocar na banda. Both of their albums received positive reviews from music critics.

After releasing the first album, the group disbanded. Buhr and França, however, continued together for some years. But, after recording the second disc, França decided to start her solo career, leaving Comadre Fulozinha. However, the leader Buhr did not give up and invited other musicians for continuing her works. Currently, the lineup is Karina Buhr (vocals, percussion and rebec), Mairah Rocha (vocals, harmonica and percussion), Flávia Maia (vocals and percussion), Marcelo Monteiro (saxophone and flute) and Letícia Coura (vocals, cavaquinho and acoustic guitar). Dani Zulu (vocals and percussion) also participated of the group as special guest. With this new lineup, the band recorded its third album in 2009, named Vou voltar andando.

== Discography ==
- 1999: Comadre Florzinha, CPC UMES
- 2003: Tocar na banda, Ybrazil/Trama
- 2009: Vou voltar andando
