= Lula Côrtes =

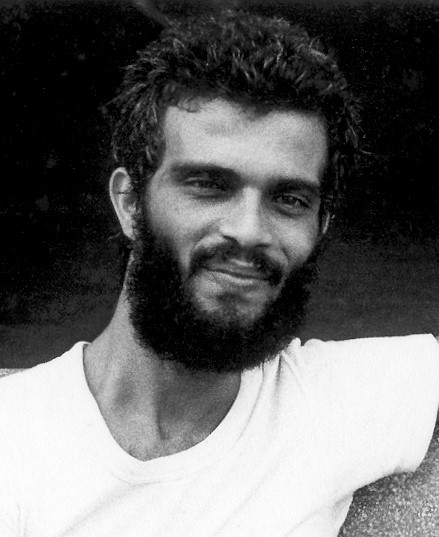

Background information
- Born: 9 May 1951; Recife, Pernambuco, Brazil
- Died: 26 March 2011 (aged 61) Recife, Pernambuco, Brazil
- Genres: Psychedelic rock, experimental

Luiz Augusto Martins Côrtes (9 May 1951 – 26 March 2011), better known as Lula Côrtes, was a Brazilian musician, best remembered for his collaboration with Zé Ramalho on the 1975 album Paêbirú.

He released several albums, including Satwa (1973) and Rosa de Sangue (1980). He worked with Ramalho on other albums, including his 1978 debut, Zé Ramalho, De Gosto de Água e de Amigos in 1985 and Cidades e Lendas in 1996.

== Death ==
Lula Côrtes died on 26 March 2011, in Recife, Brazil from throat cancer at the age of 61.

== Discography ==
- 1973: Satwa
- 1975: Paêbirú
- 1980: Rosa de Sangue
- 1981: O Gosto Novo da Vida
- 1988: Bom Shankar Bolenath
- 1996: Má Companhia
- 2006: A Vida Não É Sopa
