= André Geraissati =

Brazilian guitarist (1951–2025)

Andre Geraissati
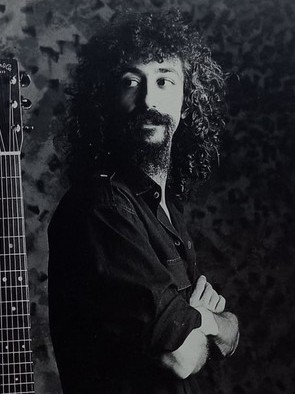
- Geraissati, c. 1987

Background information
- Born: André Luiz Geraissati; 7 September 1951
- Died: 19 November 2025 (aged 74)
- Genres: Brazilian
- Occupation: Musician
- Instrument: Acoustic guitar

André Luiz Geraissati (7 September 1951 – 19 November 2025) was a Brazilian guitarist. He played with Grupo D'Alma, Egberto Gismonti, Bobby McFerrin, and Wynton Marsalis.

== Grupo D'Alma ==
From 1979 to 1985, he was a part of Grupo D'Alma, a guitar trio which also included Rui Saleme and Ulisses Rocha. In 1979, they released A Quem Interessar Possa. In 1982, they played the International Jazz Festival of São Paulo.

== Solo ==
In 1985, Geraissati began a solo career releasing Insight. In 1987, he signed with Warner Bros. released the double album Solo. In 1988, DADGAD was released, and in 1989, the album 7989.

== Death ==
Geraissati died on 19 November 2025, at the age of 74.
