= Bacamarte =

Brazilian progressive rock band

- Origin: Brazil
- Genres: Progressive rock, symphonic rock
- Years active: 1974–1984; 2012; 2014-present
- Label: Rarity Records
- Members: Mario Neto; Sergio Villarim; Delto Simas; Marco Verrissimo; Márcus Moura; Mr. Paul; Jane Duboc

Bacamarte is a Brazilian symphonic/progressive rock band originally formed in 1974 by three school friends, although, because of their ages, they soon disbanded. In 1977 Neto reformed Bacamarte with a new set of musicians and it was this line-up that in 1978 recorded Bacamarte's opus Depois do Fim. Neto was wary of the then popular disco scene and decided that he would withhold the tape and release it at a more suitable time. After being persuaded by a friend in 1982 he submitted the tape to a local radio station; the album itself was then released in early 1983. A second album was released in 1999 from material recorded in the 1980s; this album, Sete Cidades (Seven Cities) is largely considered a Mario Neto solo work and features only Neto and keyboardist Robério Molinari. However, the original line up decided to join again for a series of shows, and are working together from time to time using the moniker Bacamarte.

== Lineup ==
- Vinícius de Oliveira – bass
- Nelson Paiva – drums
- Hugo Lacerda – vocals
- Jane Duboc – vocals.
- Márcus Moura – flute, accordion.
- Mario Neto – electric and acoustic guitars, piano, keyboards, bass, drums, percussion, vocals.
- Mr. Paul – percussion.
- Delto Simas – bass.
- Marco Verissimo – drums.
- Sergio Villarim – keyboards.

== Discography ==
- Depois Do Fim (1983)
- Sete Cidades (1999)

== All-Time Ranking ==
Depois Do Fim is ranked number 66 on the Prog Archives Top Studio Albums of All-Time.
