= Buhr (musician) =

Brazilian singer-songwriter (born 1974)

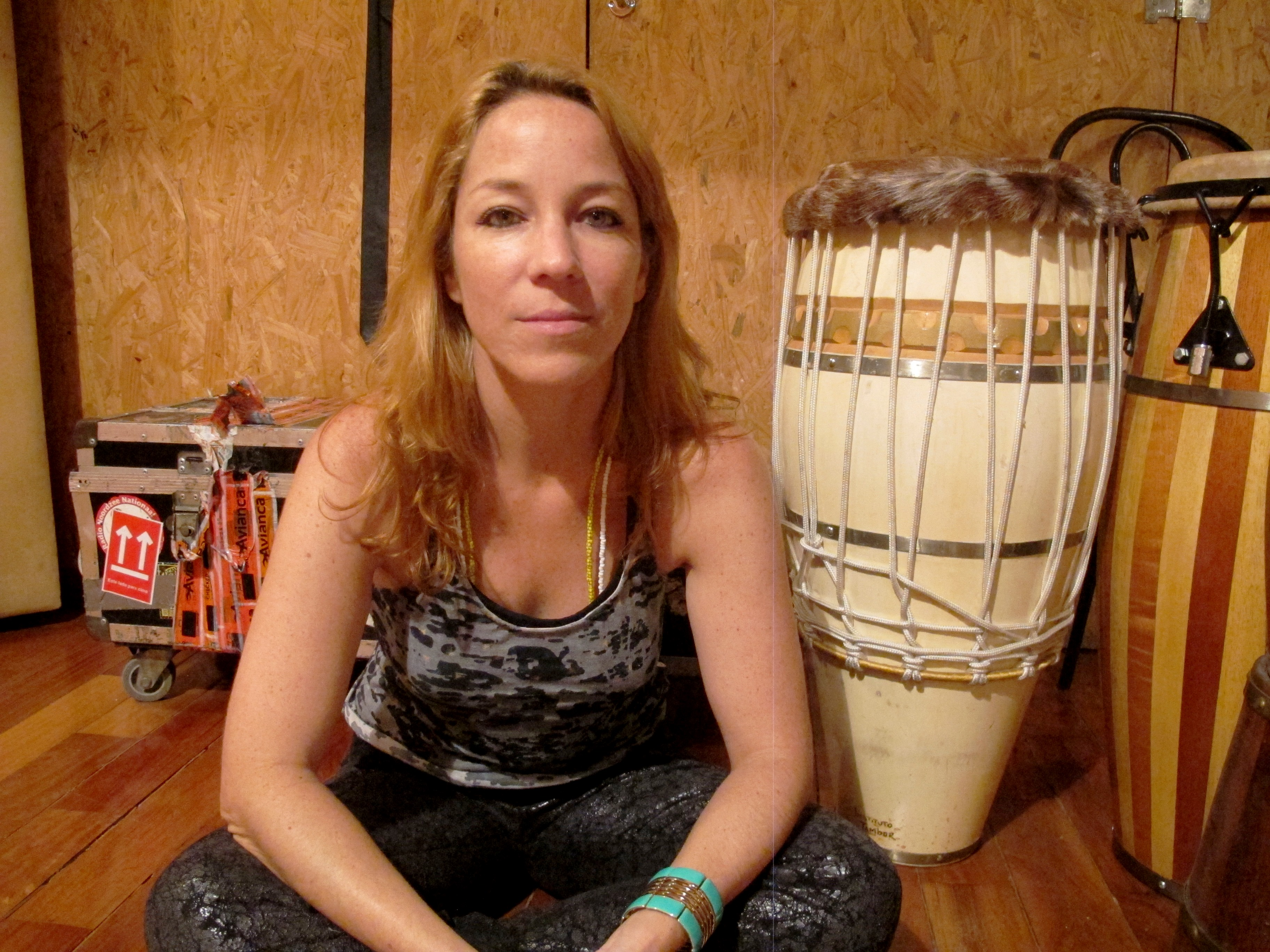
- Born: 20 May 1974 (age 52); Salvador, Bahia, Brazil
- Occupations: Singer-songwriter, actress
- Years active: 1990–present
- Musical career
- Genres: Electronic music, Rock, MPB, Mangue bit

Buhr (formerly Karina Buhr, born 20 May 1974), is a Brazilian singer-songwriter, actress and percussionist.

== Biography ==
Born in Salvador, Buhr grew up in Recife, where she started collaborating as a percussionist with several traditional maracatu groups. In 1997 she co-founded the band Comadre Florzinha, serving as singer, composer, multi-instrumentalist and album cover illustrator. She started her solo career in 2010, with the album Eu menti pra você, with which she was awarded the Prêmio APCA of the Associação Paulista de Críticos de Arte for best new artist. In 2011 she released her second album Longe de Onde and took part to several festivals, including Rock in Rio and Roskilde Festival. Both her first two albums were included in the list of the best albums of the year published by Rolling Stone Brasil. She was nominated at the MTV Video Music Brazil for best female artist, best album and best song. In 2014 she held a European tour, performing in Paris, Berlin, Madrid, Barcelona, Porto and Lisbon. In 2015 she released her third album, Selvática, and held a national tour. In 2018 she reunited with Comadre Florzinha members Alessandra Leão and Isaar França for a series of shows. In 2019 she released the album Desmanche, also serving as co-producer with Regis Damasceno.

Buhr won the award for best soundtrack at the 45th Brasília Film Festival for the Marcelo Gomes's film Once Upon a Time Was I, Verônica. As an actress, she took part to several stage plays with the Teatro Oficina company in São Paulo. She made her film debut in My Name Is Baghdad (Meu nome é Bagdá) by Caru Alves de Souza. Also a writer, in 2015 she published a collection of poems entitled Desperdiçando Rima.

== Personal life ==
Buhr has dropped her first name instead only using her surname to align with her identity as non-binary and agender.

== Discography ==
- Eu menti pra você (2010)
- Longe de Onde (2011)
- Selvática (2015)
- Desmanche (2019)
- Feixe de fogo (2026)
