= Zé Ramalho (album) =

Studio album by Zé Ramalho
- Released: 1978
- Recorded: November/December 1977
- Genre: MPB, folk rock, progressive rock
- Length: 37:37; 56:36 (Remastered version)
- Label: Epic (CBS – Sony Music)
- Producer: Carlos Alberto Sion

Zé Ramalho chronology
Paêbirú (1975)	Zé Ramalho (1978)	A Peleja do Diabo com o Dono do Céu (1980)

Zé Ramalho is the debut album (if Paêbirú is not taken into account) by the artist of same name, released in 1978.

It features two great hits of his career: "Chão de Giz" and "Avôhai". Patrick Moraz, keyboardist of the band Yes, guest appeared in the track "Avôhai". The CD was re-released in 2003 with five bonus tracks.

== Background ==
The songs of the album were created during trips through the states of Paraíba and Pernambuco between 1975 and 1976, when Ramalho was studying medicine at the Federal University of Paraíba.

With these tracks, he left college and moved to Rio de Janeiro, where he approached several producers and businessmen to try and land a deal for his first solo album. However, he was rejected by all of them after showing them "Avôhai", "Vila do Sossego" and "Chão de Giz" until he met Jairo Pires, then president of CBS, via which the album was released.

== Production, "Avôhai" and reception ==
The good thing is that the artist allowed us to work as a team in a different language than that which existed in the Brazilian music. We used regional percussion, emphasizing the violas, because Ramalho has a very strong country rock vein, and the Northeastern regional element.

— Carlos Alberto Sion (producer),

The album features many artists including Sérgio Dias, Dominguinhos, Altamiro Carrilho, Bezerra da Silva, Paulo Moura and keyboardist Patrick Moraz of Yes fame, the latter on "Avôhai". Sion kept contact with Moraz, which is what allowed the opportunity for his guest appearance. He played a keyboard that Sion had rented from Lincoln Olivetti.

"Avôhai" was composed as a tribute to Ramalho's grandfather, who adopted him after his father died by drowning two years after he was born. Ramalho said that inspiration for the song came after an experience with psilocybin mushrooms in a friend's farm. He looked at the sky and saw the "shadow of a gigantic spaceship", and a voice whispered "Avôhai" in his ear. He was in that farm for a college assignment. "Avôhai" comes from the words "Avô" (grandfather) and "Pai" (father). The song marked the first time he listened to his own work on the radio, when he was in a taxi heading to Galeão Airport in order to catch a plane for another leg of the album's promotional tour.

The album didn't receive much attention from the press, and when it did, it received heavy criticism; Ramalho believes critics simply had a prejudice against his Northeastern origins. A story published by Folha de S.Paulo in 1980, however, says critics were positive about the album and that some established a comparison between Ramalho and Bob Dylan. About this, in the same story, Ramalho said they did so because "they didn't know Otacílio Batista" - one of Brazil's greatest repentists, according to him.

In 2014, "Chão de Giz" was listed by ECAD as the tenth song with most live cover versions performed in that year.

== Track listing ==
No.	Title	Music	Length
1.	"Avôhai"	Zé Ramalho	4:57
2.	"Vila do Sossego" ("Village of Tranquility")	Zé Ramalho	3:54
3.	"Chão de Giz" ("Chalk Ground")	Zé Ramalho	4:45
4.	"A Noite Preta" ("The Black Night")	Alceu Valença, Lula Côrtes, Zé Ramalho	3:33
5.	"A Dança das Borboletas" ("The Butterflies' Dance")	Alceu Valença, Zé Ramalho	5:23
6.	"Bicho de 7 Cabeças" ("7-Headed Animal", an expression meaning a problem that is very difficult to solve)	Geraldo Azevedo, Zé Ramalho	2:24
7.	"Adeus Segunda-feira Cinzenta" ("Goodbye, Grey Monday")	Geraldo Azevedo, Zé Ramalho	4:43
8.	"Meninas de Albarã" ("Albarã Girls")	Zé Ramalho	4:34
9.	"Voa, Voa" ("Fly, Fly")	Zé Ramalho	3:10

=== Remastered version ===
Apart from all original tracks, the remastered version contains the following bonus tracks, all of them being acoustic guitar & voice versions:

No.	Title	Music	Length
1.	"Avôhai"	Zé Ramalho	5:02
2.	"Chão de Giz" ("Chalk Ground")	Zé Ramalho	4:55
3.	"Bicho de 7 Cabeças" ("7-Headed Animal", an expression meaning a problem that is very difficult to solve)	Geraldo Azevedo, Zé Ramalho	2:30
4.	"Vila do Sossego" ("Village of Tranquility")	Zé Ramalho	3:54
5.	"Rato do Porto" ("Port Rat")	Zé Ramalho	2:40

== Personnel ==
- Zé Ramalho – Acoustic guitar, viola, lead vocals.
- Chico Julien — bass
- Chico Batera — drums
- Gian Carlos Pareschini – Violin on "Vila do Sossego
- Lula Côrtes – Electric tricordia on "A Noite Preta"
- Lourenço Baeta – Flute on "Voa, Voa"
- Odaires Rosangela – Choir on "Voa, Voa"
- Sergio Dias Baptista - Lead Guitar on "A Danca das Borboletas"
- Patrick Moraz; Synthesizers on "Avôhai"
