= Grupo D'Alma =

Brazilian band

- Genres: Brazilian
- Years active: 1970s–1980s
- Past members: André Geraissati; Mozart Mello; Ulisses Rocha; Rui Saleme; Candido Penteado Serra

Grupo D'Alma is a Brazilian acoustic guitar band that performed in the 1970s and 1980s.

== Career ==
The band started as a trio in the 1970s. The best personnel included, at various times, André Geraissati, Mozart Mello, Ulisses Rocha, Rui Saleme, Candido Penteado Serra.

== Discography ==
- A Quem Interessar Possa (Clam, 1979)
- D'Alma (Som Da Gente, 1981)
- Cartas de Amor (2013)
