= Wannabe Jalva =

Brazilian rock band

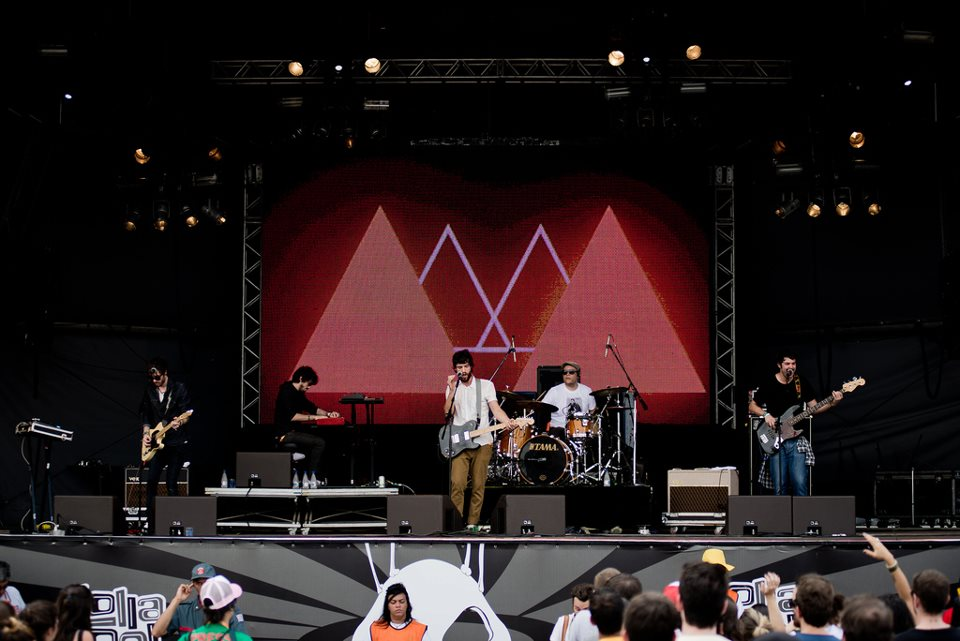
- Wannabe Jalva @ Lollapalooza BR 2013

Background information
- Origin: Porto Alegre, Brazil
- Genres: Groove rock, space bass, space rock
- Years active: 2011–present
- Label: Independent
- Members: Tiago Abrahão; Rafael Rocha; Felipe Puperi; Fernando Paulista
- Past members: João Augusto Lopes
- Website: www.wannabejalva.com www.facebook.com/wannabejalva

Wannabe Jalva is a space groove rock band formed in 2011 by Tiago Abrahão (guitar/bass/seq), Felipe Puperi (vocal/guitar), Rafael Rocha (vocal/guitar/bass) and Fernando Paulista (drums) in Porto Alegre, Brazil.

== Biography ==
Wannabe Jalva began playing their self-proclaimed "uterus space-groove rock" in 2010. In 2011, they were invited to play the inaugural MECAFestival in Porto Alegre, playing alongside Two Door Cinema Club and Vampire Weekend. That summer they released their debut EP, Welcome To Jalva. The record featured the hit single "Follow It" which was featured on an episode of CSI: NY. Wannabe Jalva closed out the year with a slot opening for Pearl Jam and Los Angeles punk rock band X at Zequinha Stadium (20,000 capacity). Pearl Jam hand selected Wannabe Jalva after considering a number of Brazilian bands for the opening slot.

Wannabe Jalva's live following grew throughout Brazil via extensive touring in 2012. They were invited back to MECAFestival to play alongside The Rapture, Mayer Hawthorne and other top-tier artists, as well as a gig at Lupaluna, the second largest festival in the south of Brazil. Wannabe Jalva released So Long in 2012 – a special two song collection featuring a Justice x Led Zeppelin mashup titled "On'n'On meets Kashmir" and a live version of "Full of Grace". In 2013, Wannabe Jalva was invited to play Lollapalooza Brazil in São Paulo.

=== Collecture EP ===
They began to work on new material in 2013.

== Discography ==
Albums

- Welcome to Jalva (2011)

EPs

- Collecture (2014)

Singles

- The Way (2013)
