= The Fevers =

Brazilian rock band

- Also known as: The Fenders (former name)
- Origin: Rio de Janeiro, Brazil
- Years active: 1964-present

The Fevers are a Brazilian band formed in the city of Rio de Janeiro in 1964. Part of a movement known as Jovem Guarda, they were formerly known as The Fenders when they were formed. The original line up was: Almir Ferreira Bezerra (vocals), Liebert Ferreira Pinto (bass), Lécio do Nascimento (drums), Pedrinho (guitar), Cleudir Teles Borges (keyboards), and Jimmy Cruise (vocals). The name was changed to The Fevers after Cruise left the band.

== Discography ==
- Vamos Dançar o Let Kiss (1965)
- A Juventude Manda vol. I (1966)
- A Juventude Manda vol. II (1967)
- The Fevers vol. III (1968)
- Os Reis do Baile (1969)
- O Máximo em Festa (1969)
- Fevers (1970)
- Explosão musical dos Fevers (1971, London Records)
- Fevers (1972)
- Fevers (1973)
- Fevers (1974)
- O Sol Nasce Para Todos (1975)
- Fevers (1976)
- Fevers (1977)
- Fevers (1978)
- Disco Club (1979, EMI)
- Fevers (1980)
- Fevers (1981)
- Fevers (1982)
- Fevers (1983)
- A Maior Festa do Mundo (1983, EMI)
- Fevers (1984)
- Fevers (1985)
- Fevers (1986)
- Fevers (1987)
- Fevers (1988)
- Fevers (1989)
- Fevers (1991)
- Agora é Pra Valer (1992)
- A Gente era Feliz e Não Sabia (1995, Som Livre)
- Vem Dançar (1998)
- Ao Vivo (1999, Sony BMG)
- Fevers (2004)
- Ao Vivo (2007) - CD e DVD
