= A Bolha =

Brazilian rock band from Rio de Janeiro

- Origin: Rio de Janeiro, Brazil
- Genres: rock, progressive rock, psychedelic rock
- Years active: 1965—1978, 2004—2006

A Bolha (The Bubble) is a Brazilian rock (music) band that formed in 1965 as The Bubbles.

== History ==
The Band was started by Cesar and Renato Ladeira in 1965. They started out only playing cover songs and in 1966 released their first single, The Bubbles, which consisted of 2 cover songs by The Rolling Stones and Los Shakers. In 1970 they changed their name to A Bolha and the band now consisted of Renato Ladeira on keyboard, Pedro Lima on guitar, Arnaldo Brandão on bass and Gustavo Schroeter on drums.

In 1971 their next single, Sem Nada, was released, and in 1973 their first LP Um Passo à Frente was recorded and released. In 1977 their next LP, É Proibido Fumar was released. After 30 years of not recording they finally released a CD in 2007 called É so curtir.

They have played with famous Brazilian musicians such as Gal Costa, Erasmo Carlos, Caetano Veloso and Raul Seixas.

== Discography ==
- The Bubbles (1966)
  - Side A: Não Vou Cartar o Cabelo (Break It All)
  - Side B: Por que Sou Tão Feio (Get Out of My Cloud)
- A Bolha (1971)
  - Side A: Sem Nada/18:30
  - Side B: Os Hemadecons Cantavam em Coro Chôôôô..
- Um Passo a Frente (1973)
  - 01 – Um Passo à Frente
  - 02 – Razão de Existir
  - 03 – Bye My Friend
  - 04 – Epitáfio
  - 05 – Tempos Constantes
  - 06 – A Espera
  - 07 – Neste Rock Forever
- É proibido fumar (1977, LP)
  - 01 – Deixe Tudo de Lado
  - 02 – Difícil é Ser Fiel
  - 03 – É Proibido Fumar
  - 04 – Estações
  - 05 – Sai do Ar
  - 06 – Consideração
  - 07 – Torta de Maçã
  - 08 – Luzes da Cidade
  - 09 – Clímax
  - 10 – Vem Quente Que Eu Estou Fervendo
  - 11 – Talão de Cheques
- É so curtir (2007, CD)
  - 01 – É Só Curtir
  - 02 – Não Sei
  - 03 – Cinema Olimpia
  - 04 – Sem Nada
  - 05 – Sub Entendido
  - 06 – Não Pare na Pista
  - 07 – Matermatéria
  - 08 – Cecília
  - 09 – Você Me Acende ( You Turn Me On) - Part. Esp.: Erasmo Carlos
  - 10 – Rosas
  - 11 – Desligaram os Meus Controles

== Soundtracks ==
- Salário Minimo, Brazilian film from 1970 in which the band appears playing in the opening.
- 1972, 2006 Brazilian movie in which the band plays the songs É Só Curtir and Sem Nada.

== Bibliography ==
- Bahiana, Ana Maria. Almanaque Anos 70. Rio de Janeiro: Ediouro, 2006 (Almanac of the 70s.)
- https://web.archive.org/web/20070312180705/http://www.senhorf.com.br/revista/revista.jsp?codTexto=2461 (Portuguese)
