= Jameh Mosque of Fahraj =

Shi'ite mosque in Fahraj, Yazd province, Iran

Jāmeh Mosque of Fahraj
- مسجد جامع فهرج
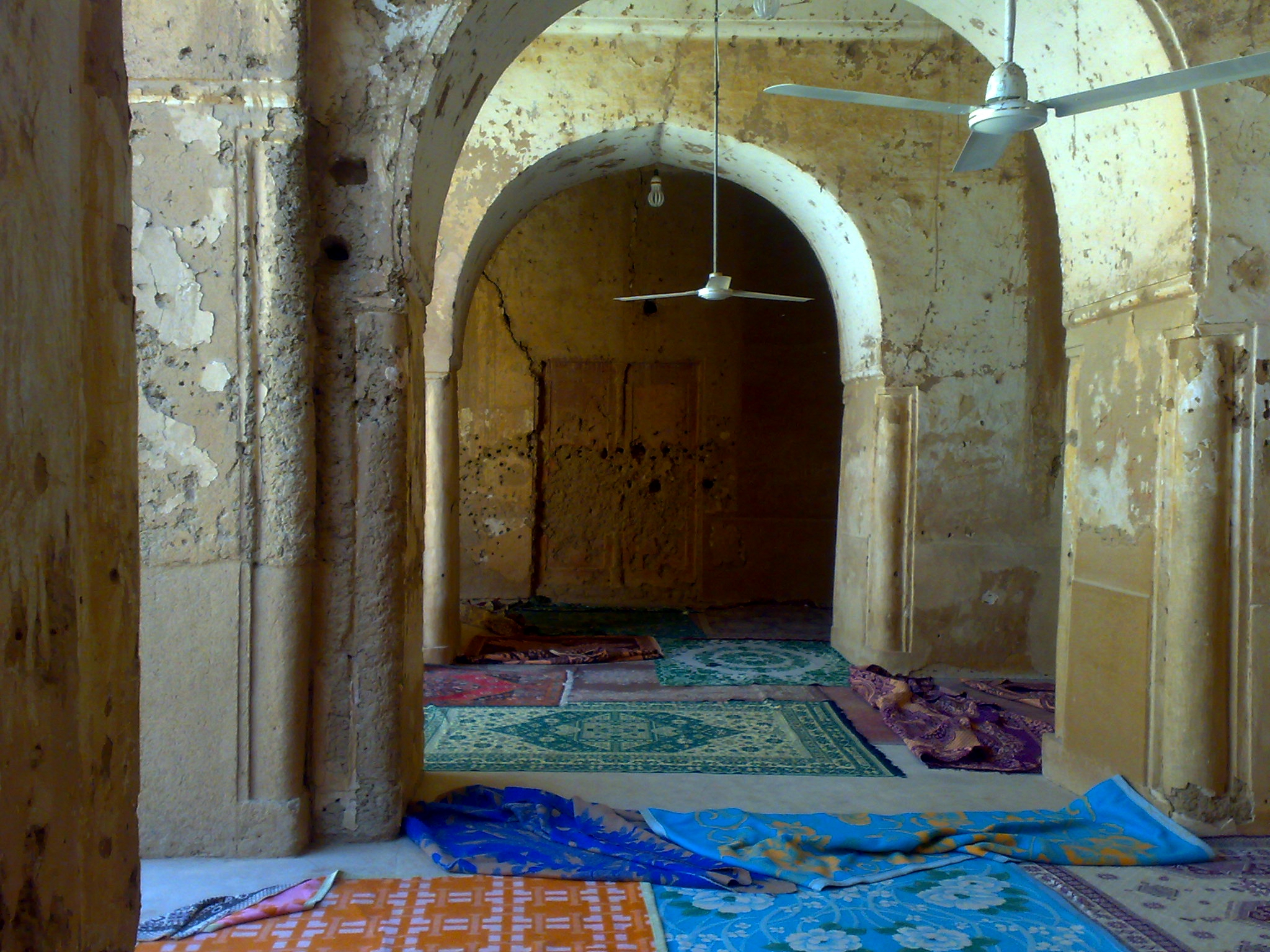
- The mosque shabestan in 2011

- Location of the mosque in Iran

Religion
- Affiliation: Shia Islam
- Ecclesiastical or organisational status: Friday mosque
- Status: Active

Location
- Location: Abarkuh, Yazd Province
- Country: Iran
- Coordinates: 31°45′51″N 54°34′53″E

Architecture
- Type: Mosque architecture
- Style: Khorasani; Abbasid; Ziyarid (minaret)
- Completed: 7th century CE; 9th century CE; 10th century CE (minaret)

Specifications
- Minaret: One
- Materials: Adobe; plaster; clay; mud bricks

Iran National Heritage List
- Official name: Jāmeh Mosque of Fahraj
- Type: Built
- Designated: 21 December 1970
- Reference no.: 906
- Conservation organization: Cultural Heritage, Handicrafts and Tourism Organization of Iran

The Jāmeh Mosque of Fahraj (Persian: مسجد جامع فهرج, romanized: Masjed-e Jomeh, Fahraj ) is a Shi'ite Friday mosque (jāmeh) located in Fahraj, Yazd province, Iran.

The mosque was completed during the 7th to 10th centuries CE and is one of the oldest extant mosques in Iran; it demonstrates the simple architectural characteristics of the early Islamic centuries.

The mosque was added to the Iran National Heritage List on 21 December 1970, administered by the Cultural Heritage, Handicrafts and Tourism Organization of Iran.

== Architecture ==
The mosque is significant as one of the oldest extant mosques in Iran, representing an important evolutionary stage in mosque construction from post and lintel systems, to wooden roofs on arcades, finally to full scale vaulting with permanent materials. The construction of the Jameh Mosque of Fahraj and the Tarikhaneh Mosque at Damghan mark a 9th-century change in the primary structural construction method of mosques from columns to piers. The original patron and date of construction is unknown, but may have occurred during the Sasanian era, based on the excavation of ancient Zoroastrian fire temple remnants and the tradition of reappropriating former sacred sites.

The mosque primarily consists of an internal sahn, vaulted sanctuary and arcades, and a clay minaret. It is largely built of sun-dried, unfired clay tiles and mud bricks. The modest internal courtyard is lined with clay tiles and contains a now dry central ablution tank. The internal façades are near symmetrical and consist of three arched bays defined by thick piers, partly relieved by vertical niches. The court's roofline is uninterrupted and a decorative cornice emphasizes horizontality that is challenged by the mosque's minaret and arched silhouette of barrel vaults over the jamaat khana (main prayer hall). The mosque, like its contemporaries at Damghan and Nayin, features the traditional Iranian barrel vault (or beez), supported on squat rectangular brick piers. The roofing system is made up of five linear vaults oriented east-west, three of which are interrupted by the central courtyard. Two additional vaults orient north-south, and the roof extends to the mosque's northwest corner.

The minaret was added to the mosque during the 10th century and, together with the minarets at Nayin and Siraf, is one of the earliest remaining examples of its type. The minaret is built as a tapering cylinder with an internal spiral staircase lit by slits that form a regular pattern on the minaret's external elevation. The projecting balcony is crowned by triangular crenellations with a pronounced batter (a slope, as of the outer face of a wall, that recedes from bottom to top), accentuating the minaret's verticality.

The mosque design's simplicity and lack of ornamentation have resulted in modest public attention. The mosque represents a little documented innovation in Islamic architecture that was soon lost to the dominant four-iwan plan that became common from the 11th-century Seljuk era.

== Gallery ==
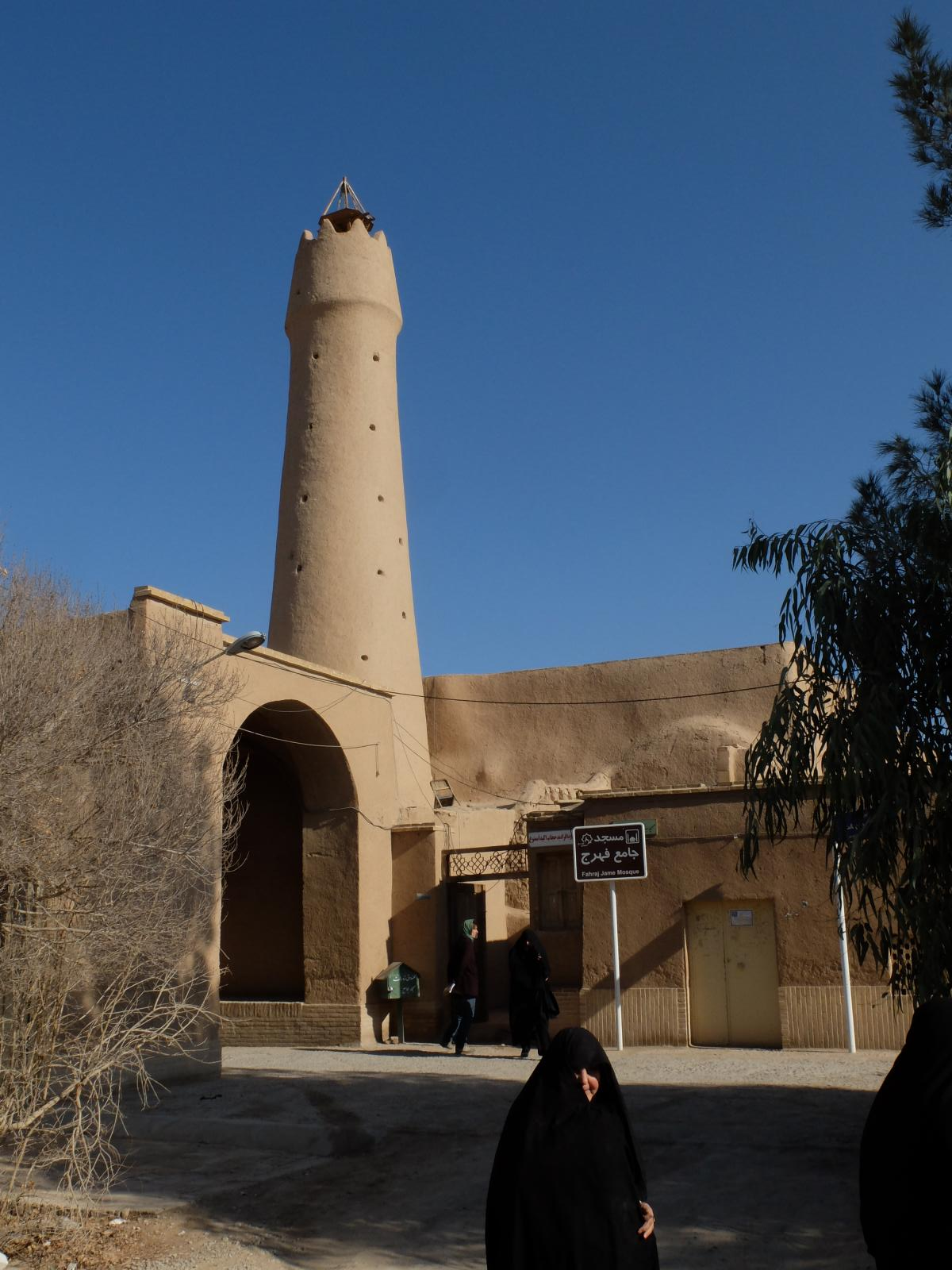
The mosque's minaret, c.10th century

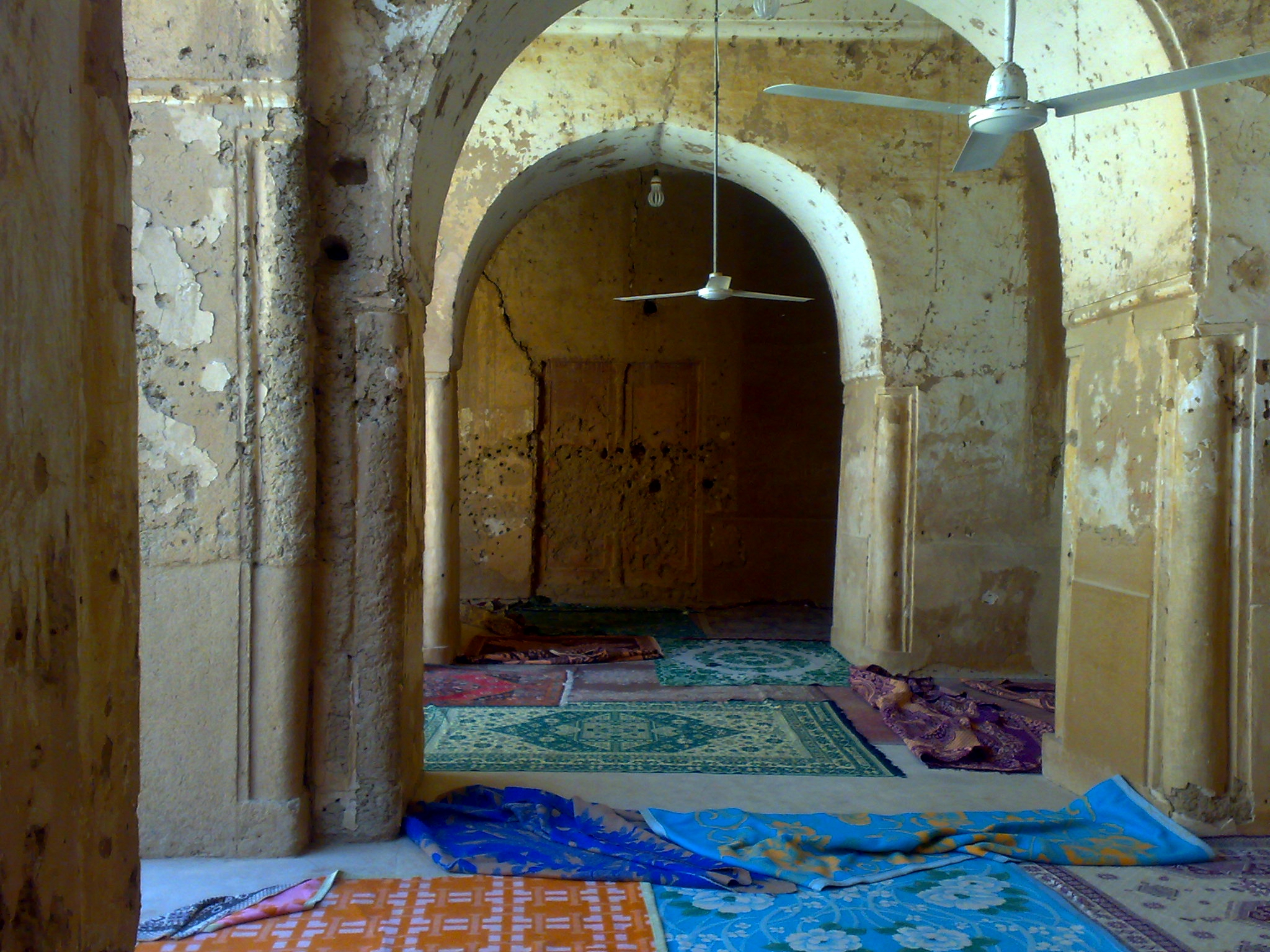
The mosque's shabestan

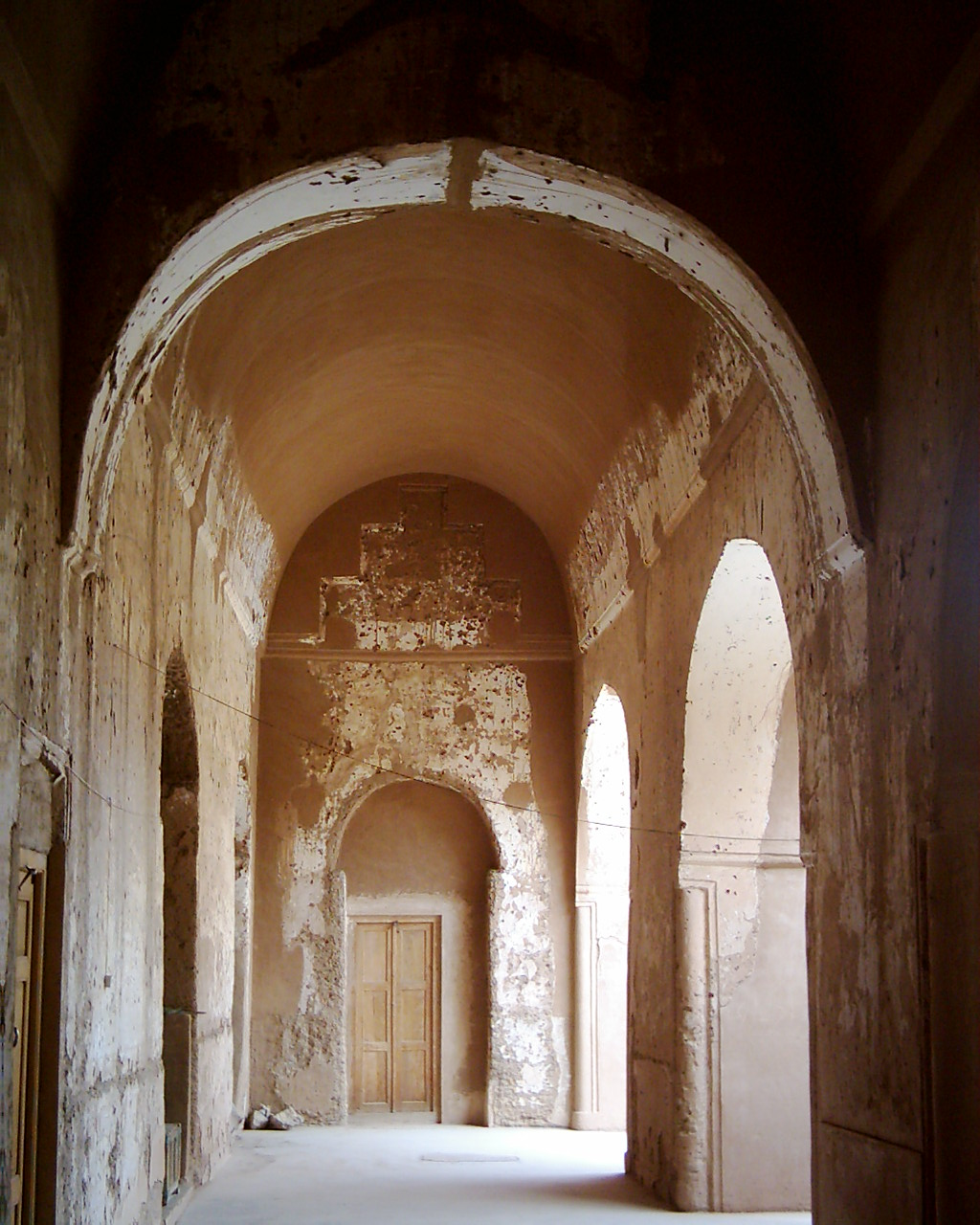

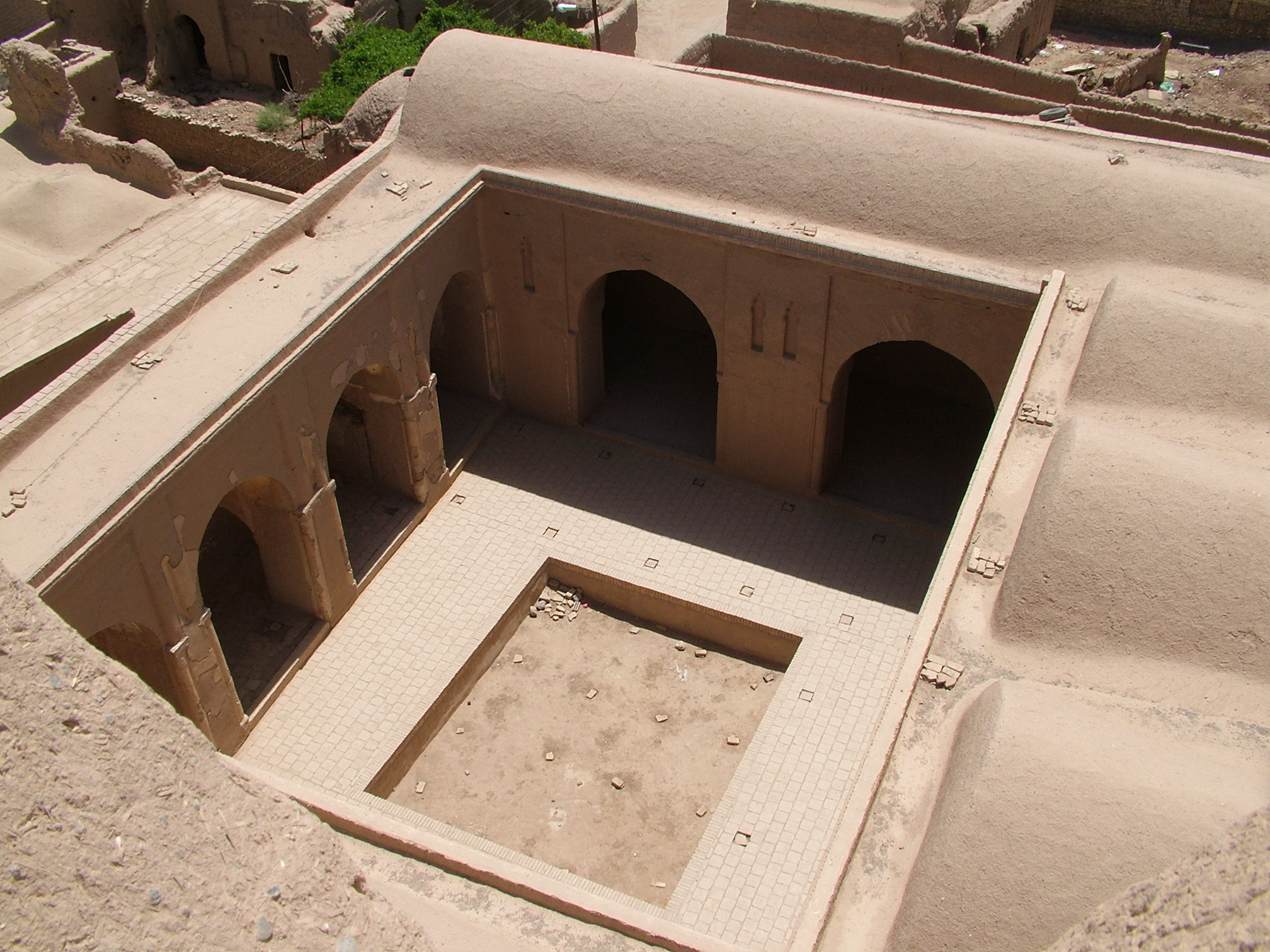

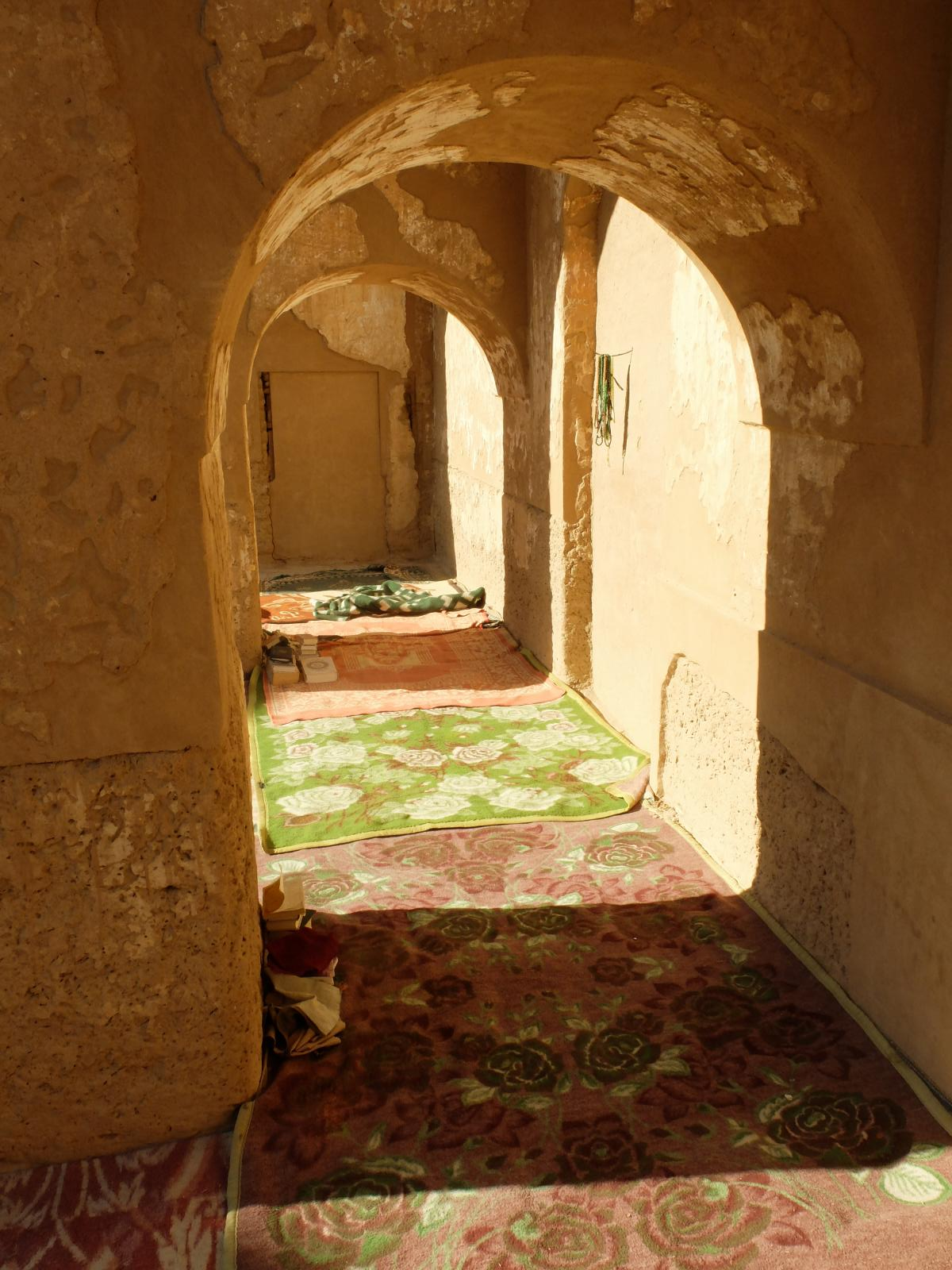

== See also ==
- Shia Islam in Iran
- List of mosques in Iran
- List of oldest mosques in Iran
