= Jameh Mosque of Shushtar =

Mosque in Shushtar, Khuzestan, Iran

- مسجد جامع شوشتر
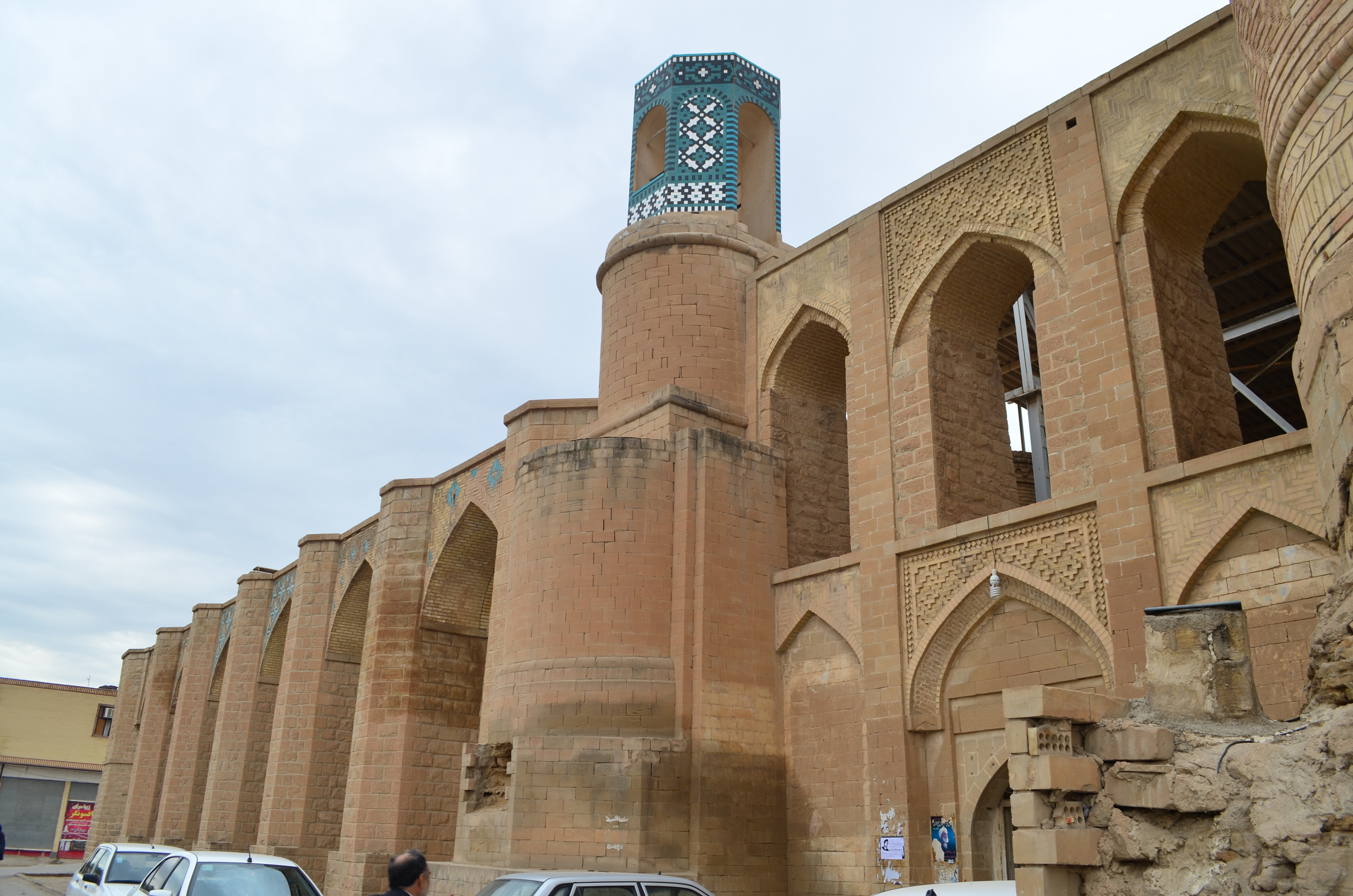
- The mosque in 2015

- Location of the mosque in Iran

Religion
- Affiliation: Shia Islam
- Ecclesiastical or organisational status: Friday mosque
- Status: Active

Location
- Location: Shushtar, Khuzestan Province
- Country: Iran
- Coordinates: 32°02′30″N 48°50′50″E

Architecture
- Type: Mosque architecture
- Style: Abbasid; Safavid
- Completed: 5th century AH; (9th century CE); Abbasid Caliphate

Specifications
- Dome: One (since collapsed)
- Minaret: Two (one remains)
- Minaret height: 26 m (85 ft) (only 16 m (52 ft) remain)
- Materials: Stone; bricks; ceramic tiles

Iran National Heritage List
- Official name: Friday Mosque of Shushtar
- Type: Friday Mosque
- Designated: 1937
- Reference no.: 286
- Conservation organization: Cultural Heritage, Handicrafts and Tourism Organization of Iran

The Jameh Mosque of Shushtar (Persian: مسجد جامع شوشتر, romanized: Masjid-e Jameh'e Shooshtar; Arabic: جامع تستر) is a Shi'ite Friday mosque located in Shushtar, in the province of Khuzestan, Iran. The mosque was completed during the Abbasid Caliphate of Hasan al-Askari, who ruled during the 9th century CE.

The mosque was added to the Iran National Heritage List on 3 March 1937, administered by the Cultural Heritage, Handicrafts and Tourism Organization of Iran.

== Architecture ==
Completed in the Abbasidian style, most likely during the 5th century AH (9th century CE), the mosque was renovated during the Safavid era.

The mosque comprises a large domed Shabestan with 48 stone pillars, a sahn surrounded by twelve brick columns, and two 26-metre-tall (85 ft) minarets to the east, built in the 8th century, of which only one remains and it is now 16 metres (52 ft) high. In the middle of southern side of the Shabestan is an adytum with plaster works, completed in the Safavid style. On the other sides inscriptions and plaster engravings with royal decrees. On the external doorway to this area, which is adorned with arches and decorative brick works there are two inscriptions on stone with sacred verses of the Quran. In the eastern side of the mosque is a remnant of a beautiful minaret dating from the 8th century AH, which is intricately worked and inscribed with sacred versus of "Allah", "Mohammad", "Ali".

== Gallery ==
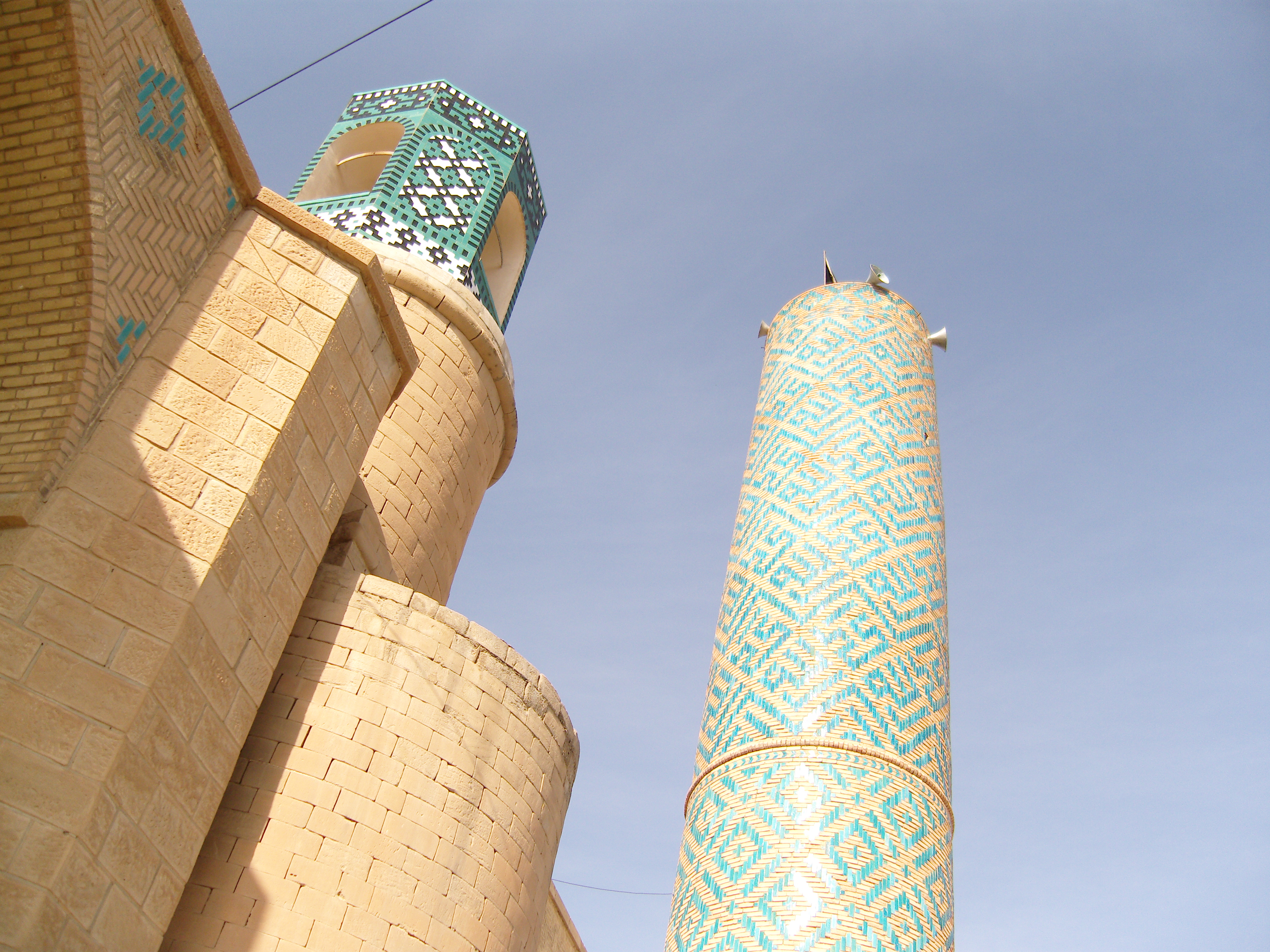
A restored minaret in 2010

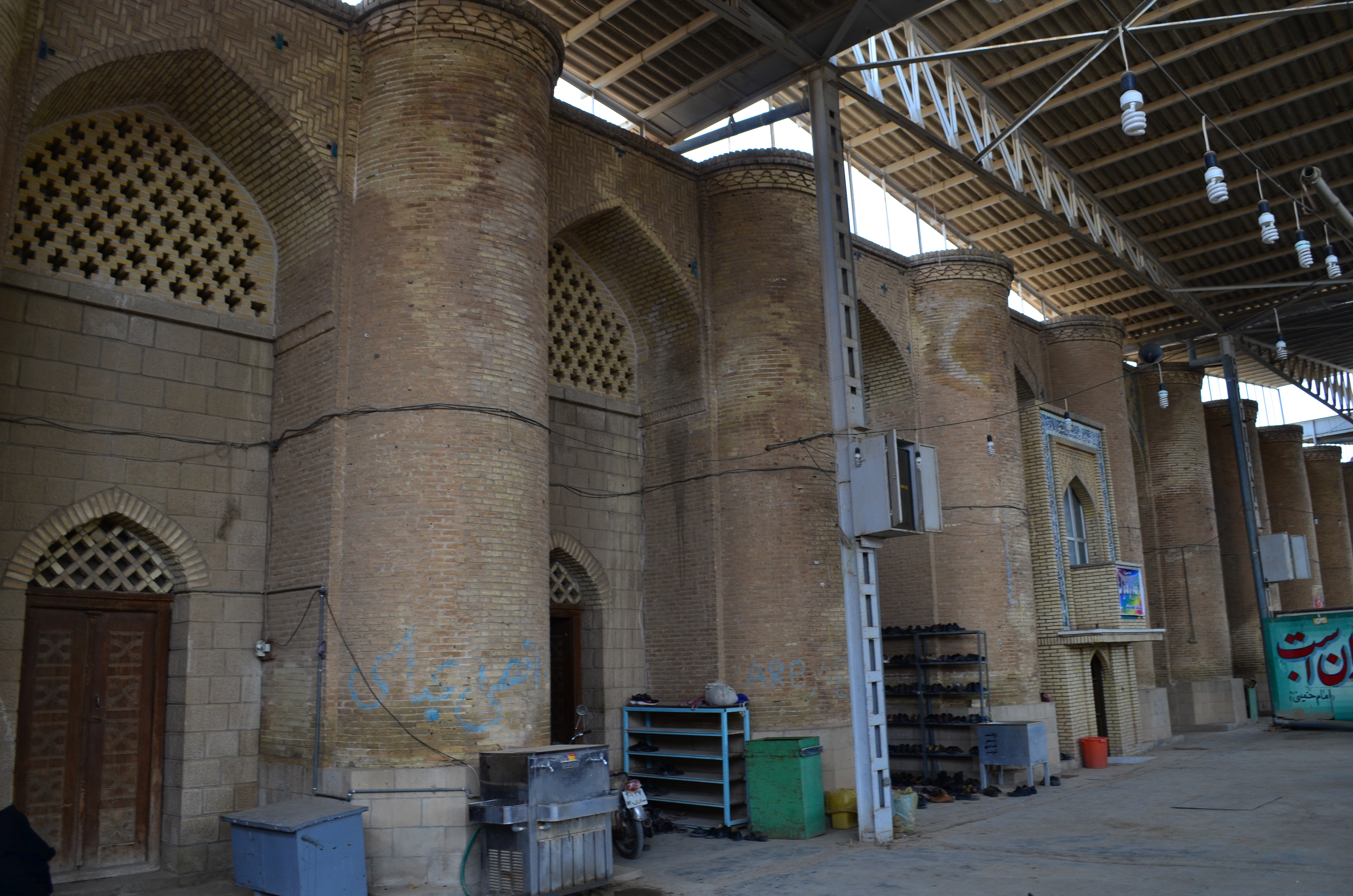
Shabestan interior in 2015

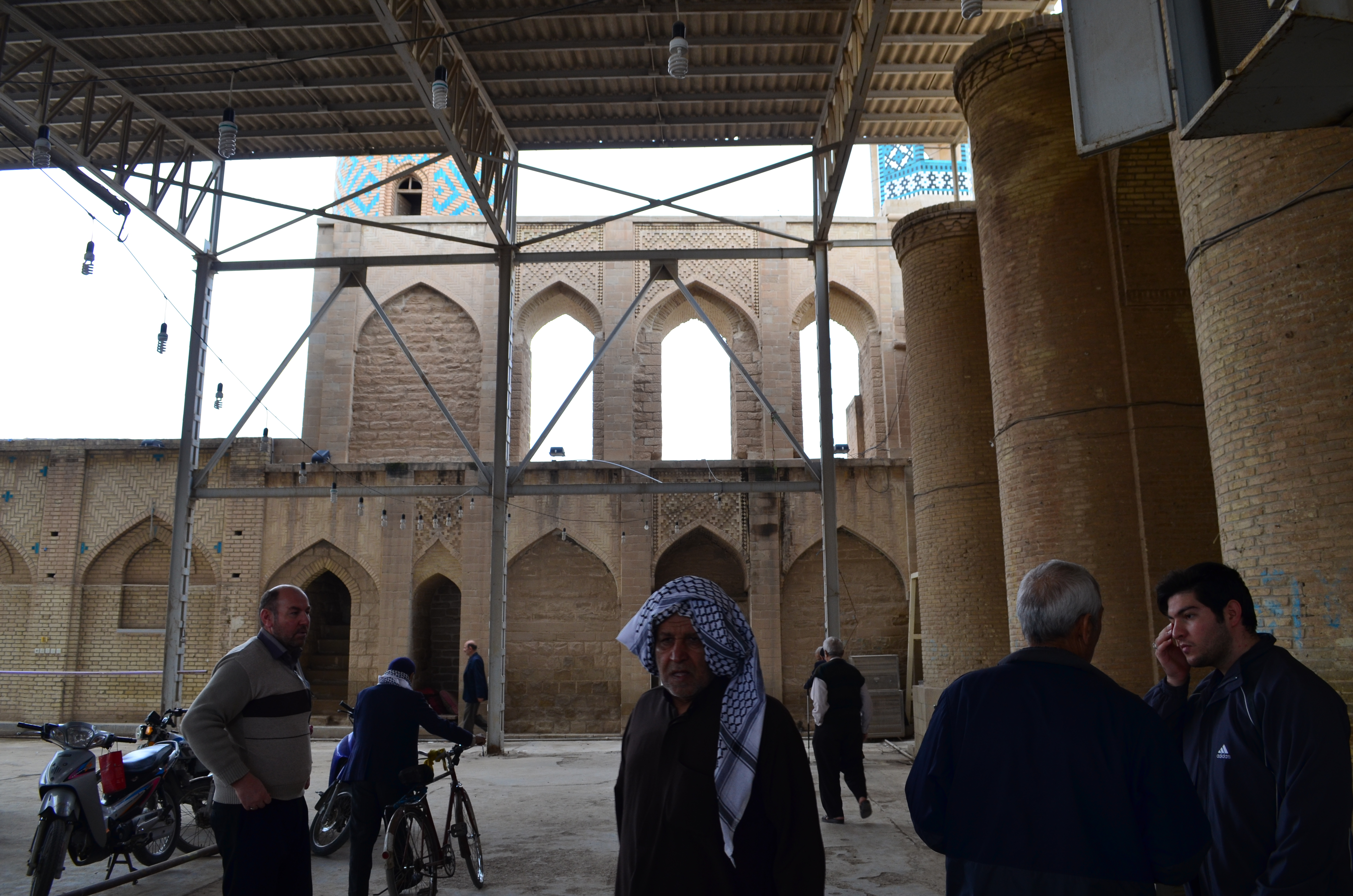
An iwan in 2015

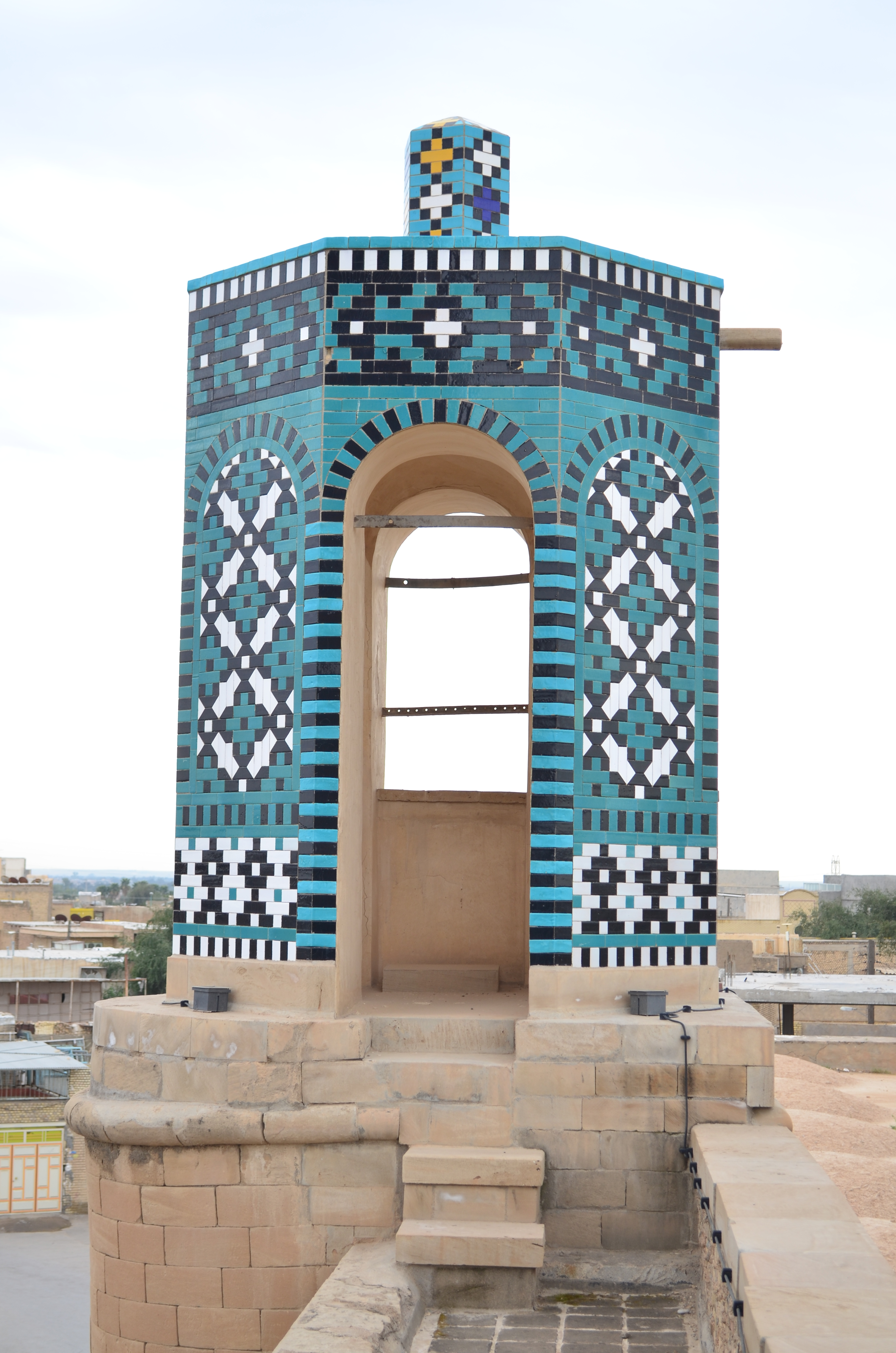
Turret-style canopy on the roofline

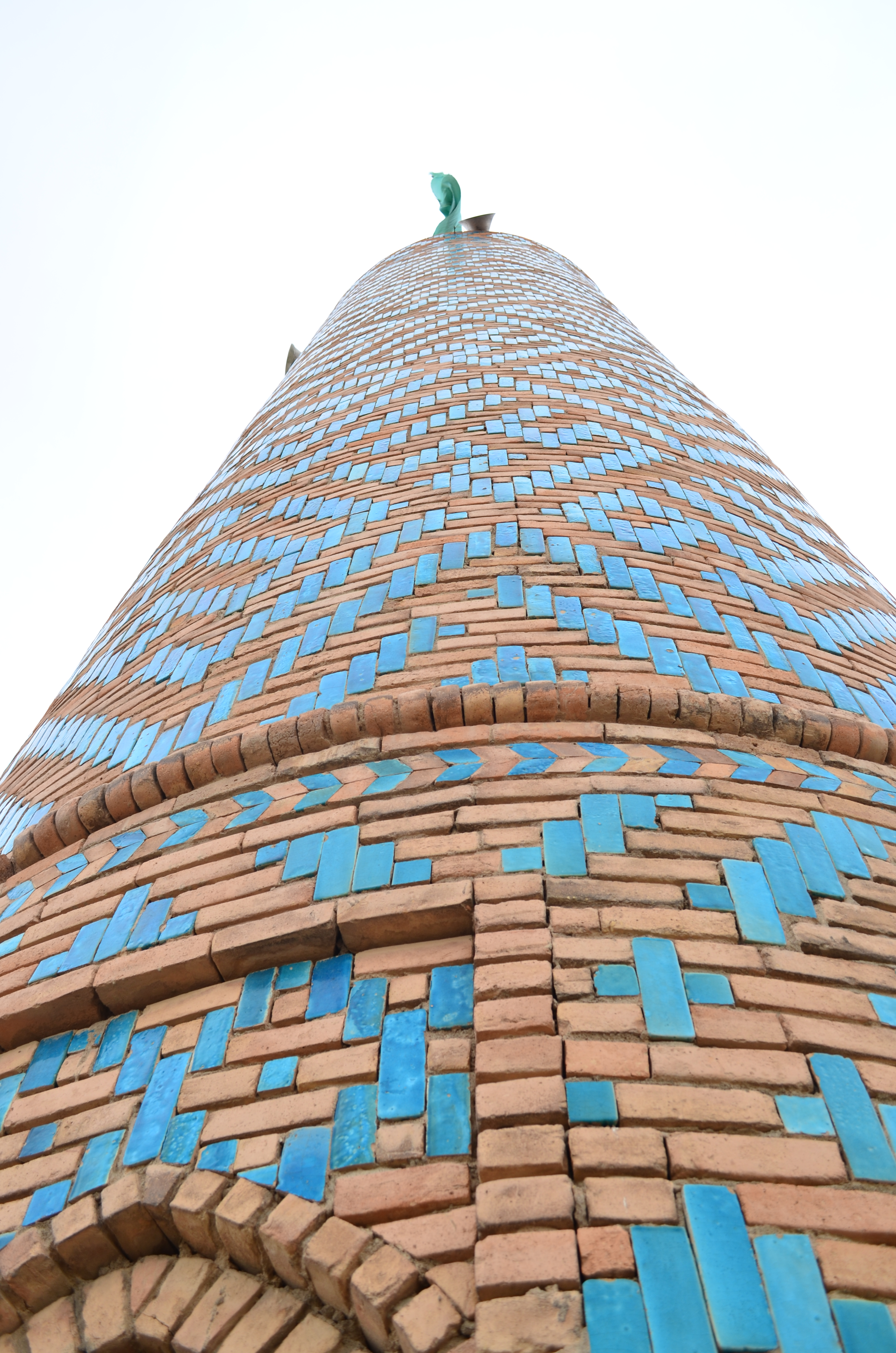
Detail of colored brickwork

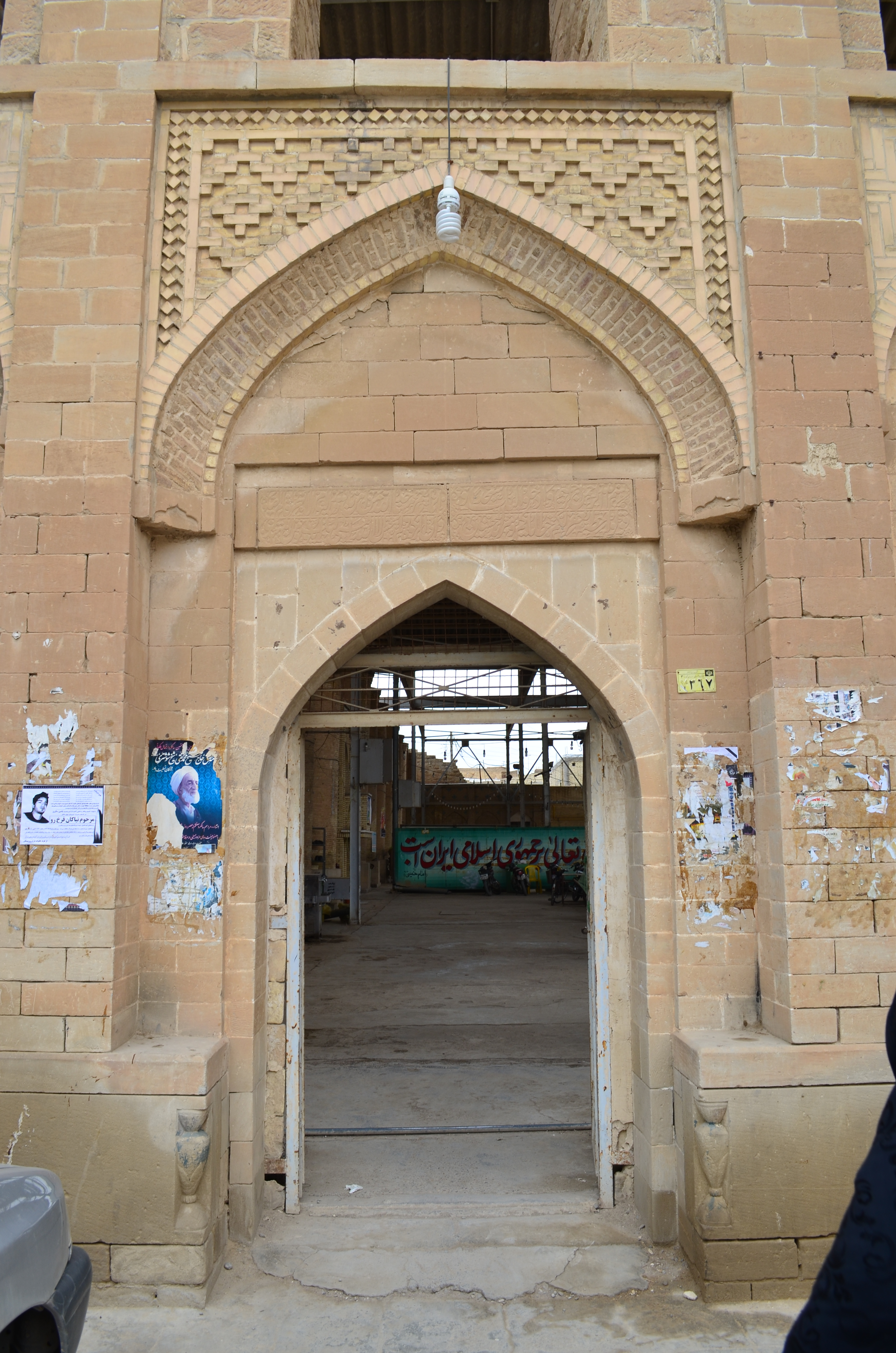
A brick iwan

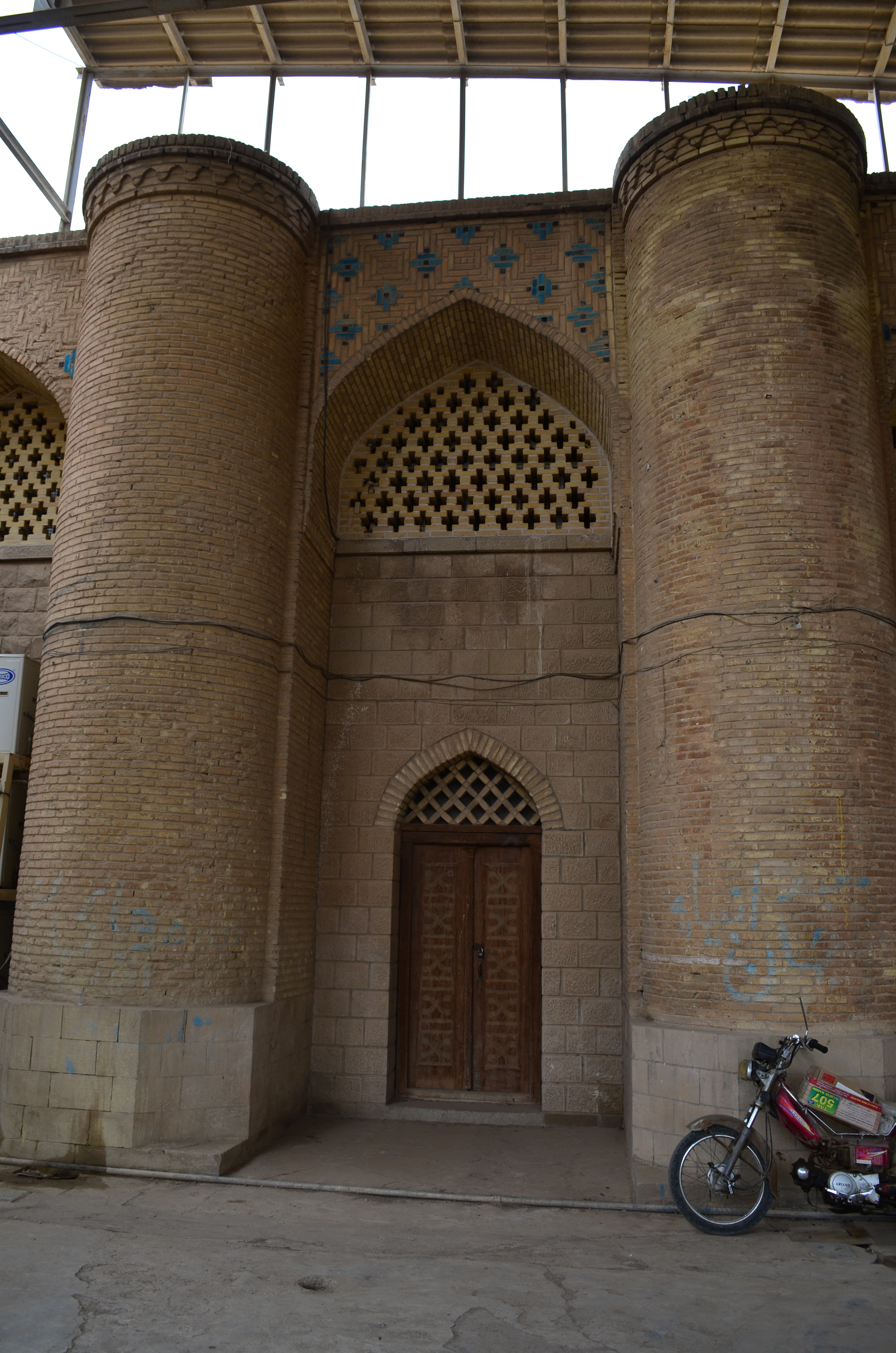
A brick iwan

== See also ==
- Shia Islam in Iran
- List of mosques in Iran
- List of oldest mosques in Iran
