= Maria Lúcia Godoy =

Brazilian soprano (1924–2025)

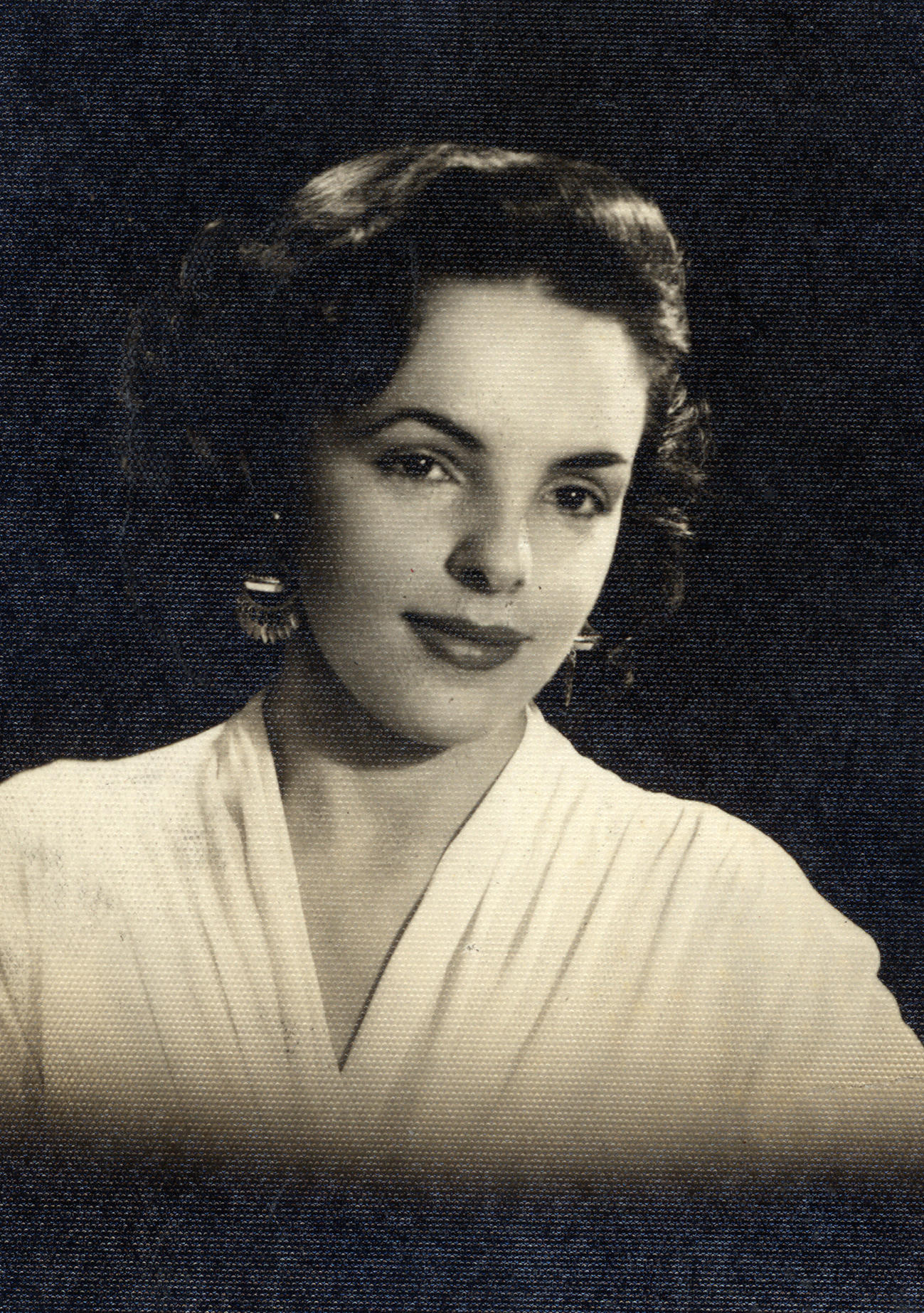
- Godoy in 1956

Background information
- Born: September 2, 1924; Mesquita, Minas Gerais, Brazil
- Died: May 16, 2025 (aged 100) Belo Horizonte, Minas Gerais, Brazil
- Occupation: Soprano
- Instrument: Voice
- Years active: 1950–2020
- Spouse: Isaac Karabtchevsky (divorced)

Maria Lúcia Godoy (September 2, 1924 – May 16, 2025) was a Brazilian soprano known for her interpretations of classical and Brazilian music, particularly the works of Heitor Villa-Lobos. Her extensive career as a chamber singer and symphonic soloist earned her recognition as one of the most important Brazilian vocalists of her generation.

== Early life ==
Godoy was born in Mesquita, Minas Gerais, Brazil. She moved to Belo Horizonte during her childhood, where she pursued a degree in Literature at the Federal University of Minas Gerais. Her musical education began under the tutelage of Honorina Prates. She later studied with Pasquale Gambardella in Rio de Janeiro and further honed her skills in Germany, thanks to a scholarship that allowed her to study with Margarete von Winterfeld.

== Career ==
Godoy's professional debut was as the principal soloist of the Madrigal Renascentista, conducted by maestro Isaac Karabtchevsky, whom she later married. She gained acclaim for her performances of both classical and Brazilian repertoire, becoming particularly associated with the works of Heitor Villa-Lobos. Her recording of Bachianas Brasileiras No. 5 is considered one of the definitive interpretations of the piece.

Throughout her career, Godoy performed in major cities across Brazil and internationally, showcasing a repertoire that spanned from imperial-era modinhas to contemporary compositions. She premiered works by composers such as Edino Krieger, Cláudio Santoro, Ronaldo Miranda, and Marlos Nobre. Her versatility extended to opera, where she portrayed roles including Mimi (La Bohème), Rosina (The Barber of Seville), and Dorabella (Così fan tutte).

In 1977, she released the album Maria Lucia Godoy Interpreta Villa-Lobos, featuring performances accompanied by guitarist Sérgio Abreu and an orchestra of cellos conducted by Alceo Bocchino.

== Personal life and death ==
Maria Lúcia Godoy was married to conductor Isaac Karabtchevsky. She turned 100 in September 2024, and died in Belo Horizonte on May 16, 2025.
