= List of the oldest mosques =

The oldest mosques in the world can refer to the oldest, surviving mosque building or to the oldest mosque congregation. There is also a distinction between old mosque buildings in continuous use as mosques and others no longer used as mosques. In terms of congregations, there are early established congregations that have been in continuous existence, and early congregations that ceased to exist.

The major regions, such as Africa and Eurasia, are sorted alphabetically, and the minor regions, such as Arabia and South Asia, are sorted by the dates in which their first mosques were reportedly established, more or less, barring those that are mentioned by name in the Quran.

To be listed here a site must:

- be the oldest mosque in a country, large city (top 50), or oldest of its type (denomination, architectural, etc.);
- be the oldest congregation of its type (denomination).

== Mentioned in the Quran ==
The following are treated as the oldest mosques or sanctuaries mentioned in the Quran:

Building	Image	Location	Country	First built	Notes
Al-Haram Mosque		Mecca	Saudi Arabia	Unknown, considered the oldest mosque, associated with Abraham	Al-Masjid al-Ḥarām, (Note: Mentioned in: Quran 2:144–217; Quran 5:2; Quran 8:34; Quran 9:7–28; Quran 17:1; Quran 22:25; Quran 48:25–27.) the holiest sanctuary, containing the Ka'bah, a site of the Ḥajj ('Pilgrimage'), the Qiblah (direction of formal prayers of Muslims), and the first mosque in Islamic thought. Rebuilt many times, notably 1571 by the Ottomans, and the late 20th century by the Saudis, further enlargement under way since 2010.
Al-Aqsa Mosque Compound (Al-Aqsa)		East Jerusalem	Palestine (under an Israeli occupation)	Considered the second oldest mosque in Islamic tradition, associated with Abraham. First prayer hall built in it in 637/638. The Dome of the Rock was constructed in 692, the Qibli Mosque in 705.	Al-Masjid al-Aqṣá, the former Qiblah, site of the significant event of Night Journey (Isra and Mi'raj), considered the third holiest site in Islam. The Qur'an does not specify the precise location of "the furthest place of prayer", and its meaning was debated by early Islamic scholars. Eventually, a consensus emerged its identification with the Temple Mount in Jerusalem. The term Al-Aqsa properly refers to the whole Temple Mount compound (seen as a single mosque). (Note: According to historian Oleg Grabar, "It is only at a relatively late date that the Muslim holy space in Jerusalem came to be referred to as al-haram al-sharif (literally, the Noble Sacred Precinct or Restricted Enclosure, often translated as the Noble Sanctuary and usually simply referred to as the Haram). While the exact early history of this term is unclear, we know that it only became common in Ottoman times, when administrative order was established over all matters pertaining to the organization of the Muslim faith and the supervision of the holy places, for which the Ottomans took financial and architectural responsibility. Before the Ottomans, the space was usually called al-masjid al-aqsa (the Farthest Mosque), a term now reserved to the covered congregational space on the Haram, or masjid bayt al-maqdis (Mosque of the Holy City) or, even, like Mecca's sanctuary, al-masjid al-ḥarâm,") The mosque compound should not be confused with the silver-domed congregational mosque or prayer hall facing Mecca, commonly referred to in English as Al-Aqsa Mosque, and also known as Al-Qibli Mosque (see below).
Quba Mosque		Medina	Saudi Arabia	622	The first mosque built by Muhammad in the 7th century CE, mentioned as the "Mosque founded on piety since the first day" in the Quran. Classical scholars generally identify the mosque in the verse as Quba Mosque. However, a well-known narration also identifies it as the Prophet's Mosque (Al-Masjid al-Nabawi), leading some scholars to discuss both mosques in relation to the verse.

== Africa ==
=== Northeast Africa ===
Northeast Africa
Building	Image	Location	Country	First built	Tradition	Notes
Mosque of the Companions		Massawa	Eritrea	620s–630s		Believed by some to be the first mosque in Africa and built by the companions of Muhammad in the 7th century.
Al Nejashi Mosque		Negash	Ethiopia	7th century		By tradition, the burial site of several followers of Muhammad who, during his lifetime, fled to the Aksumite Kingdom to escape persecution in Mecca. It was recently renovated by TIKA, a Turkish cooperation organization.
Mosque of Amr ibn al-As		Cairo	Egypt	641		Named after 'Amr ibn al-'As, commander of the Muslim conquest of Egypt. First mosque in Egypt and claimed to be the first mosque in Africa.
Mosque of Ibn Tulun		Cairo	Egypt	879		
Al-Azhar Mosque		Cairo	Egypt	972	Sunni	
Arba'a Rukun Mosque		Mogadishu	Somalia	1268/9	Sunni	

=== Northwest Africa ===
Northwest Africa
Building	Image	Location	Country	First built	Tradition	Notes
Great Mosque of Kairouan (or Uqba ibn Nafi Mosque)		Kairouan	Tunisia	670	Sunni	Alternatively named after Uqba ibn Nafi. Believed to be the first mosque in the Maghreb. The current mosque dates from a total reconstruction starting in 836 under the Aghlabids, with further restorations and additions in later periods.
Sidi Okba Mosque		Sidi Okba	Algeria	686–1025		Mosque and tomb dated between 686 and 1025, starting with the tomb in 686. The mosque was subsequently built around it.
Al-Zaytuna Mosque		Tunis	Tunisia	698	Sunni	There are some doubts about the exact foundation date: usually attributed to 698 but it could have been a bit later in 734. The current mosque dates from a total reconstruction in 864 under the Aghlabids, with further modifications and renovations in later eras.
Mosque of Agadir		Tlemcen	Algeria	790		Mosque founded in 790 by Idris I at a settlement called Agadir, site of former Roman settlement Pomeria, now within the modern city of Tlemcen. Only its foundations remain today, along with a minaret added in the 13th century by Yaghmurasan.
Bu Ftata Mosque		Sousse	Tunisia	838–841		Dated by an inscription to the reign of Abu Iqal al-Aghlab ibn Ibrahim (838–841). Minaret added later under the Hafsids.
Great Mosque of Sfax		Sfax	Tunisia	849		Exact construction date uncertain, but probably around 849.
Great Mosque of Sousse		Sousse	Tunisia	851		
Al-Qarawiyyin mosque		Fez	Morocco	859		Some doubts exist about its foundation; with possible alternative of 877 CE, based on an inscription discovered in the 20th century. The present building dates from multiple later expansions and reconstructions, with the oldest elements dating from the 10th century. Significantly expanded under the Almoravids between 1135 and 1143.
Mosque of the Andalusians		Fez	Morocco	859		There are doubts about its foundation; and the oldest parts of the present building date from the 10th century. It was mostly reconstructed by the Almohads between 1203 and 1207.
Al-Naqah Mosque		Tripoli	Libya	973		Oldest Islamic monument in Tripoli, though its history is not well-known. Likely built by the Fatimid caliph al-Mu'izz, though it may be older. Reconstructed in 1019 AH (1610/1611 CE).
Great Mosque of Tlemcen		Tlemcen	Algeria	1082		Founded under the Almoravids, decoration completed or redone in 1136 by another Almoravid ruler. Important renovation and additions took place in 1236 under the first Zayyanid ruler.

=== Southeast Africa ===
Southeast Africa (including nearby islands of the Indian Ocean, but barring countries that are also in Southern Africa)
Building	Image	Location	Country	First built	Tradition	Notes
Shanga Mosque		Shanga, Pate Island	Kenya	830		Foundation discovered, with coins attesting dates, during the 1980s excavations. The earliest concrete evidence of Muslims in East Africa.
Great Mosque of Kilwa		Kilwa Kisiwani	Tanzania	1000–1100		in ruins
Kizimkazi Mosque		Dimbani, Zanzibar	Tanzania	1107		According to an inscription.
Malindi Mosque		Stone Town, Zanzibar	Tanzania	15th century		some sources claim an origin in the 15th century.
Mandhry Mosque		Mombasa	Kenya	1570		it retains its Swahili architecture.
Tsingoni Mosque		Tsingoni, Mayotte	France	1538		
Al-Fatah Mosque (Green Mosque)		Kigali	Rwanda	1913		Founded by coastal Swahili-speaking Tanzanian Muslims who came to Rwanda to work in the German administration, of what was then German East Africa.

=== Southern Africa ===
Southern Africa
Building	Image	Location	Country	First built	Tradition	Notes
Auwal Mosque		Cape Colony	South Africa	1798		Recognised as the first mosque established in the country, at the time Cape Colony.
Palm Tree Mosque		Cape Colony	South Africa	1807		Building constructed in 1788 (238 years ago).
Masjid al-Qudama		Uitenhage, Eastern Cape	South Africa	1849		It has been deduced that the mosque was a completed in March 1849
Grey Street Mosque (Juma Mosque)		Durban	South Africa	1881		
Soofie Masjid		Butha Buthe	Lesotho	1900		Founded by Soofie Saheb at the turn of the century; the community is described as African Muslim yet speaking an Indian language.
Habibia Soofie Saheb Jamia Masjid		Rylands, Cape Town	South Africa	1905		
Lobatse Masjid		Lobatse	Botswana	1960s		Founded by Indian Muslims who were brought over during the British colonial period.
Ezulwini Mosque		Ezulwini, near Mbabane	Eswatini	1982		

=== West Africa ===
West Africa
Building	Image	Location	Country	First built	Tradition	Notes
Great Mosque of Djenné		Djenné	Mali	13th century		
Djinguereber Mosque		Timbuktu	Mali	1327		
Larabanga Mosque		Larabanga	Ghana	1421		The oldest existing mud-brick mosque in Ghana.
Great Mosque of Kano		Kano	Nigeria	15th century		Built in for Emir Muhammad Rumfa
Agadez Mosque		Agadez	Niger	1515		Niger's oldest mosque.
Grand Mosque, Sokodé		Sokodé	Togo	1820		

== Asia ==
=== Arabian Peninsula ===
Arabian Peninsula (including the island-state of Bahrain)
Building	Image	Location	Country	First built	Tradition	Notes
Quba Mosque		Medina	Saudi Arabia	622		Considered to be the first mosque built by Prophet Muhammad , and the second largest mosque in Medina
Al-Masjid al-Nabawi		Medina	Saudi Arabia	622		Second holiest site in Islam (after Al-Haram Mosque) and Muhammad's mosque, which houses his tomb in what was initially his and his wife Aisha's house. Largely rebuilt and greatly enlarged in the late 20th century, whilst retaining at its heart the earlier construction of the Ottomans, and landmark Green Dome atop the prophet's mausoleum.
Masjid al-Qiblatain		Medina	Saudi Arabia	623		Mosque originally with two Qiblah walls: One facing Jerusalem, the first Qiblah and another facing Mecca
Mazin Bin Ghadoubah Mosque		Samail	Oman	c. 627		Founded by Mazin Ben Ghadooba, who is considered to be the first Omani to adopt Islam during Muhammad's lifetime.
Al-Shawadhna Mosque		Nizwa	Oman	c. 628–629		Original foundation attributed by some to 7 AH (628/629 CE). A construction or renovation dated to 1529 CE is recorded by an inscription above the mihrab.
Jawatha Mosque		Al-Ahsa	Saudi Arabia	c. 629–639		Has recently been renovated and prayers are still held in this mosque.
Khamis Mosque		Khamis, Manama	Bahrain	c. 692		Though most of the structure is dated to the 11th or 12th century, it is popularly believed to have been founded by the Caliph Omar in the 600s.
Great Mosque of Sana'a		Sana'a	Yemen	7th century		Possibly the oldest mosque in the country
Al-Janad Mosque		Taiz	Yemen	7th century		
Al-Hadi Mosque		Sa'dah	Yemen	897		
Al Badiyah Mosque		Fujairah	United Arab Emirates	1400s		Some much earlier estimates have been proposed.

=== Levant ===
Levant (including Cyprus and the region of Syria)
Building	Image	Location	Country	First Built	Tradition	Notes
Al-Omari Mosque		Bosra	Syria	634-636		
Al-Omari Mosque		Daraa	Syria	634-636		
Al-Omari Grand Mosque		Beirut	Lebanon	634-636	Sunni	The mihrab is the oldest part of the mosque, dating back to the Caliphate of Umar.
Al-Qibli Mosque (al-Jami' al-Aqsa)		Jerusalem (old city)	Palestine	637		A Muslim prayer hall with a silver-colored lead dome located in the southern part of Al-Aqsa (Temple Mount), built by the Rashidun caliph Umar ibn Al-Khattab.
Ibrahimi Mosque		Hebron	Palestine	637		
Great Omari Mosque (Great Mosque of Gaza)		Gaza	Palestine	7th century		Original structure from the 7th century, renovated later. it was mostly destroyed during the 2023 Gaza war (Gaza genocide)
Umayyad Mosque (Great Mosque of Damascus)		Damascus	Syria	715	Sunni	It is considered to be the oldest mosque still in use in its original form. It was originally built after the Muslim conquest of the city in 634. The current structure dates to 715.
Great Mosque of Aleppo		Aleppo	Syria	715		The mosque was modified and completely rebuilt in later periods. The mosque and its minaret were partially destroyed in April 2013, during the Syrian Civil War
White Mosque		Ramla	Israel	720		in ruins
Great Mosque of Raqqa		Raqqa	Syria	772		In ruins
Arab Ahmet Mosque		Arab Ahmet, Nicosia	Cyprus	Late 16th century		Named in honour of a 1571 Ottoman army commander

=== Iran, Iraq, and Turkey ===
Iran, Iraq, and Turkey
Building	Image	Location	Country	First built	Tradition	Notes
Imam Ali Mosque (Old Mosque of Basra)		Basra	Iraq	635		rebuilt in 665.
Great Mosque of Kufa		Kufa	Iraq	639	Shia	rebuilt in 670. The mosque contains the remains of Muslim ibn Aqeel – first cousin of Husayn ibn Ali, his companion Hani ibn Urwa, and the revolutionary Mukhtar al-Thaqafi.
Maqam al-Imam al-Husayn Mosque		Karbala	Iraq	680	Shia	Reconstructed several times, including in 1016.
Jameh Mosque of Isfahan		Isfahan	Iran	771		First mosque on the site was built circa 771, during the reign of the Abbasid caliph al-Mansur. It was then replaced by a larger one in 840–841 during the reign of al-Mu'tasim. It underwent many changes and additions after this, most notably under the Seljuks in the late 11th and early 12th centuries.
Jameh Mosque of Fahraj		Fahraj	Iran	700s		
Great Mosque of Samarra		Samarra	Iraq	848		
Abu Dulaf Mosque		Samarra	Iraq	859		
Tarikhaneh Mosque		Damghan	Iran	9th century		The oldest mosque in Iran to preserve much of its original form. Exact date of construction is unclear, but attributed to 9th century based on its style.
Al-Khulafa Mosque		Baghdad	Iraq	908		The mosque was rebuilt and restored in the 1960s by the Ministry of Awqaf in its current shape
Al-Askari Mosque		Samarra	Iraq	944	Shia (Twelver)	Shrine of the 10th and 11th Twelver Shi'ite Imams: Ali al-Hadi and Hasan al-Askari.
Imam Ali Mosque		Najaf	Iraq	977	Shia, Sunni	Houses the tomb of Ali ibn Abi Talib, Muhammad's cousin and fourth Caliph, and the first person of the Shia Imamate.
Great Mosque of Diyarbakır		Diyarbakır	Turkey	1092	Sunni	One of the oldest known mosques in modern Turkey, possibly the oldest, but its early history is not well-understood. A mosque was founded in the area after the city's Muslim conquest in 639. The current building dates from the Seljuk-era, dated by inscription to 1091–2 and further works continuing in the 12th century.
Yivliminare Mosque (Alaeddin Mosque)		Antalya	Turkey	1230	Sunni	
Aslanhane Mosque		Ankara	Turkey	1290	Sunni	

=== Transcaucasia ===
Transcaucasia (excluding the Russian North Caucasus)
Building	Image	Location	Country	First built	Tradition	Notes
Juma Mosque		Shamakhi	Azerbaijan	743-744		Built in 743–744, set on fire by Armenian units of "Dashnaktsutiun" in 1918, reconstructed in 2009.
Blue Mosque		Yerevan	Armenia	Mid-18th century		

=== Central Asia ===
Central Asia
Building	Image	Location	Country	First built	Tradition	Notes
Po-i-Kalyan		Bukhara	Uzbekistan	713		Since 713, several buildings of the main congregational mosque have been constructed, demolished and rebuilt at this site.

=== China ===
Greater China
Building	Image	Location	Country	First built	Tradition	Notes
Huaisheng Mosque		Guangzhou	China	627		Originally built by Sa'd ibn Abi Waqqas, who was an uncle of the Islamic prophet Muhammad, and was named in memory of Muhammad. Rebuilt many times since.
Xianxian Mosque		Guangzhou City	China	629		The mosque was originally built in 629 during the Tang dynasty.
Great Mosque of Xi'an		Xi'an, Shaanxi	China	742		Although the oldest stones date from the 18th century, the mosque was founded in 742.
Niujie Mosque		Beijing	China	996		
Qingjing Mosque		Quanzhou, Fujian	China	1009		
Jinan Great Southern Mosque		Jinan, Shandong	China	1295		
Id Kah Mosque		Kashgar, Xinjiang	China	1442		
Jamia Mosque		Hong Kong	China	1890		Then British Hong Kong
Taipei Grand Mosque		Taipei	Taiwan	1947		Oldest and most famous mosque in Taiwan. Original building was firstly used in 1947, then relocated to a new site where it was reconstructed in 1960.
Kaohsiung Mosque		Taipei	Taiwan	1949		The second oldest mosque in Taiwan. The original building was built in 1949, then moved to a new location where the second building was built in 1951, and the third and final building built in 1992.
Macau Mosque		Macau	China	1980		The first and only mosque in Macau, then Portuguese Macau.

=== South Asia ===
South Asia
Building	Image	Location	Country	First built	Tradition	Notes
Barwada mosque		Ghogha, Gujarat	India	Before 623		Built by Arab traders, the qibla is faced to Bait al Mukaddas (Jerusalem). The mosque was abandoned by devotees after the qibla was changed in 623 CE to Makkah and another mosque constructed at the same time.
Cheraman Juma Masjid		Kodungallur	India	629		As per legend, it was built by Malik bin Dinar, companion of Muhammad, on orders of Cheraman Perumal, then King of modern-day Kerala, it is one of the oldest mosques in India.
Palaiya Jumma Palli		Kilakarai	India	630	Sunni	Considered to be the first mosque to be built in Tamil Nadu, and the second mosque in India. Constructed by Yemeni merchants and trade settlers in the Pandiya Kingdom and ordered by Bazan ibn Sasan, Governor of Yemen at the time of Muhammad.
Masjid Zeenath Baksh		Mangalore	India	642		Masjid Zeenath Baksh, and also known as Beliye Palli, is the third oldest mosque in India and the oldest in the state of Karnataka, constructed in 22 AH (642/643 CE). The mosque is located in the Bunder area in the city of Mangalore and is known for its pure Indian style, reminiscent of Dravidian architecture. The mosque was established by the family of sahabah of Muhammad, and is of exceptional importance to Muslims in the region.
Jame' As-Sahaba		Lalmonirhat, Rangpur	Bangladesh	688		The oldest mosque in Bangladesh, located in the Lalmonirhat District. In 69 Hijri, the mosque was built by the Companion Sa'd ibn Abi Waqqas.
Masjid Al-Abrar		Beruwala, Kalutara District, Western Province	Sri Lanka	1st century AH		The date has been carved in its stone pillars. It is situated in western province of Sri Lanka.
Haji Piyada		Balkh	Afghanistan	794 or 9th century		The oldest identifiable Islamic building in Afghanistan. Construction dated to either the 9th century or to 794.
Jamia Masjid, Banbhore		Banbhore, Sindh	Pakistan	727		This is the oldest mosque of Pakistan. Also believed to be the first mosque in South Asia. Built after the conquest of Sindh.
Great Mosque		Budaun, Uttar Pradesh	India	1223		Built by Iltutmish, the 3rd Sultan of Delhi and the Mamluk dynasty
Kazimar Big Mosque		Madurai	India	1284	Sunni, Hanafi, Shadhili	First mosque in Madurai.
Chaqchan Mosque		Khaplu, Gilgit Baltistan	Pakistan	1370		This is the oldest mosque of Gilgit Baltistan located in Khaplu.
Sixty Dome Mosque		Bagerhat	Bangladesh	1450		Built by Khan Jahan Ali, it is considered to be the second-oldest mosque in Bangladesh. The fortified structure contains eighty-one domes, sixty stone pillars and eleven mihrabs.
Neevin Mosque		Lahore	Pakistan	1460		

=== Southeast Asia ===
Southeast Asia
Building	Image	Location	Country	First built	Tradition	Notes
Sheik Karimal Makdum Mosque		Tubig Indangan, Simunul island, Bangsamoro	Philippines	1380		Founded by Makhdum Karim, who introduced Islam to the Philippines. This is the oldest mosque in Southesast Asia.
Wapauwe Old Mosque		Kaitetu, Central Maluku Regency, Maluku	Indonesia	1414		The oldest surviving mosque in Indonesia.
Ampel Mosque		Ampel, Surabaya, East Java	Indonesia	1421		The oldest surviving mosque in Java, and second oldest in Indonesia.
Masjid Sultan Sharif Ali		Brunei	Brunei	1430 (approximate)		Built under the direction of Sharif Ali ("Sultan Berkat"), who reigned 1425–1432.
Kampung Laut Mosque		Tumpat, Kota Bharu, Kelantan	Malaysia	15th century		The oldest surviving mosque in Malaysia
Great Mosque of Demak		Demak, Central Java	Indonesia	15th century		Oldest mosque in Central Java and second oldest in Java.
Talo Mano Mosque		Narathiwat	Thailand	17th century		It is at least one of the oldest known mosques in Thailand.
Masjid Omar Kampong Melaka		Central Area	Singapore	1820		Originally a wooden structure built by Arab merchant Syed Omar Ali Aljunied.

=== East Asia ===
East Asia (excluding Greater China)
Building	Image	Location	Country	First built	Tradition	Notes
Kobe Mosque		Kobe	Japan	1935		Designed in the Turkish style by a Czech architect, confiscated by the Imperial Japanese Navy in 1943, and later returned.
Seoul Central Mosque		Seoul	South Korea	1976		

== Europe ==
=== Central and Eastern Europe ===
Central Europe and Eastern Europe (excluding the Caucasus, European Russia and Nordic countries)
Building	Image	Location	Country	Built (CE)	Tradition	Notes
Al-Agha Mosque		Dragash	Kosovo	1268		Built by Muslims who migrated from Aleppo, in Syria, to Kosovo.
Dzhumaya Mosque		Plovdiv	Bulgaria	1363–1364		Built during the reign of Sultan Murad II the old building was demolished and replaced by the modern-day mosque.
Sailors' Mosque		Ulcinj	Montenegro	14th century		
Halit Efendi Mosque		Slupčane, Lipkovo Municipality	North Macedonia	1415		Considered the oldest mosque in North Macedonia. However, as a result of the various renovation works, the building has been altered to such an extent that it is no longer in its original state.
Turhan Emin-Beg Mosque		Ustikolina	Bosnia and Herzegovina	1448–1449		Built by Turhan Emin-beg. Known to have been destroyed two times (1941 and 1992) and rebuilt two times (1956 and 2007).
Fatih Mosque		Elbasan Castle	Albania	1466		Built by the orders of Sultan Mehmed II.
Old Mosque, Plav (Imperial Mosque)		Plav	Montenegro	1471		Built during the Ottoman rule in the city.
Iljaz Mirahori Mosque		Korçë	Albania	1494		It was built by Iljaz Hoxha, also known as Iljaz Bey Mirahor, and is a Cultural Monument of Albania.
King Mosque (also known as the Sultan Bayazit Mosque)		Elbasan	Albania	1502		Established in 1492; the exact year of completed is not certain. A Cultural Monument of Albania.
Mosque of Kuklibeu		Prizren	Kosovo	1534		
Mosque of Muderis Ali Efendi		Prizren	Kosovo	1543–1581		
Esmahan Sultan Mosque		Mangalia	Romania	1575		Oldest mosque in Romania
			Poland	1558		Tatar mosques in Poland were noted in a 1558 treatise Risale-i Tatar-i Lech.
			Lithuania	16th century		Various records indicate Lithuanian Tatars built mosques in then the Grand Duchy of Lithuania during the 16th century
Mosque of Sinan Pasha		Prizren	Kosovo	1615		
Log pod Mangartom Mosque		Log pod Mangartom, Municipality of Bovec	Slovenia	1916		Built by Bosniak members of the Austro-Hungarian army, in what was then Austria-Hungary.
Gunja Mosque		Gunja	Croatia	1969		The first and one of the few mosques in Croatia, located near the border with Bosnia and Herzegovina.
Vienna Islamic Centre–Mosque		Vienna	Austria	1979		
Brno Mosque		Brno	Czech Republic	1998		Construction began 1996, inaugurated 1998.

=== Iberian Peninsula ===
Iberian Peninsula
Building	Image	Location	Country	First built	Tradition	Notes
Great Mosque of Cordoba (Mezquita)		Córdoba, Andalusia	Spain	785		Originally built by Abd al-Rahman I in the then Emirate of Córdoba, it underwent successive extensions in the 9th and 10th centuries. After the Castilian conquest of Cordoba in 1236, it was converted into the city's cathedral, which it remains to this day.
Mosque of Madinat al-Zahra		Córdoba, Andalusia	Spain	941–942		Friday mosque of Madinat al-Zahra, a vast, fortified palace-city begun in 936 by Abd al-Rahman III. The city's mosque was inaugurated in 941–942. The complex was plundered & destroyed during the civil war that ended the Caliphate of Córdoba in the early 11th century. A UNESCO World Heritage Site since 2018.
Mosque of Cristo de la Luz		Toledo, Castile-La Mancha	Spain	999		Built in the then Caliphate of Córdoba, this building is a rarity in that it is in much the same state as it was when it was originally built. Originally a square structure with nine domed bays, a semi-circular apse was added in 1187, after it had been converted into a church.
Mosque inside Aljafería Palace		Zaragoza, Aragon	Spain	1046		A small prayer room inside the Aljafería Palace, dating from the Taifa period under the Hudid dynasty in the then Caliphate of Córdoba. It is accessed through a portal inside palace. In 2001, the original restored structures of the Aljafería were included in the Mudéjar Architecture of Aragon, a World Heritage Site.
Mosque of las Tornerías (Arabic: الـمـسـتـمـيـم, romanized: al-Mustimim)		Toledo, Castile-La Mancha	Spain	mid-11th-century		Built on the foundations of Roman architecture, located in the old Muslim neighborhood Arrabal de Francos, in the then Taifa of Toledo. The building continued maintaining the Islamic faith in Spain well beyond the reconquista of the city by the Christian troops of Alfonso VI of León and Castile in 1085, until the period of 1498–1505, when it was desacralizated by the Catholic Monarchs.
Ribat of Arrifana Archaeological site		Aljezur, Algarve	Portugal	1130		Probably constructed by Abu-l-Qasim Ahmad ibn al-Husayn ibn Qasi, governor of Silves and a rebel leader against the Almoravid dynasty. These are the only ruins of such Muslim fortress to have been identified in Portugal, excavated by Portuguese archaeologists since 2001.
Church of Nossa Senhora da Anunciação		Mértola, Alentejo	Portugal	Second-half of the 12th century		Unique and most identifiable former mosque in Portugal, in what was then the Almohad Caliphate, although a mixture of Almohad and Manueline post-Gothic architecture. Rebuilt in the second half of the 12th century with some elements from the 9th century.
Giralda		Seville, Andalusia	Spain	1198		Only the minaret remains, built in the then Almohad Caliphate. Mosque comparable in size to Great mosque of Cordoba, mostly destroyed by earthquake in 1365. Minaret used as a church bell tower was built higher in the 16th century.
Church of São Clemente		Tavira, Algarve	Portugal	Second-half of the 13th century		Only parts of the original minaret remain, built in the Kingdom of Portugal, incorporated in the church bell tower. It's 22.7 m (74 ft) tall and 4.2 m (14 ft) wide. Across it lies an old Muslim cemetery of Jardim dos Amuados.
Mosque of Tórtoles		Tarazona, Aragon	Spain	15th-century		Almost unaltered in the later centuries; built in the then Crown of Aragon.
San Sebastian Minaret (Alminar De San Sebastian)		Ronda, Andalusia	Spain			Only the minaret of the medium-size mosque in Plaza Abul Beka neighborhood remains in the then Almohad Caliphate. Minaret was expanded and used as a bell tower. The mosque was converted to a church but destroyed in the 1600s during Morisco Revolts. Ronda was a Muslim city for 700 years. The city had 7 or 8 mosques; none survive today.

=== Russia ===
Russia
Building	Image	Location	First built	Tradition	Notes
Juma Mosque		Derbent, Dagestan	700-900 (approximate)		Then part of the Abbasid Caliphate
Kul Sharif Mosque		Kazan, Tatarstan	1552		Original structure was destroyed in 1552 CE while the current structure is from 2005
Khan's Mosque		Kasimov	1768		
Marjani Mosque		Kazan, Tatarstan	1770		

=== Scandinavia ===
Scandinavia
Building	Image	Location	Country	First built	Tradition	Notes
Järvenpää Mosque			Finland	1942		A mosque of the community of Finnish Tatars. It is considered to be the oldest mosque in Scandinavia. Finland's first Muslim cemetery was established in the 1830s for Russian troops.
Nusrat Djahan Mosque		Hvidovre, outside Copenhagen	Denmark	1967	Ahmadiyya	The first purpose-built mosque in Scandinavia.
Islamic Cultural Centre Norway		Oslo	Norway	1974	Sunni Deobandi	Founded by Pakistani-Norwegians aided by Danish Muslims. Followed by the first Shi'i mosque, Anjuman-e Hussain, in 1975; and the first Sunni Barelvi mosque in 1976.
Nasir Mosque		Gothenburg	Sweden	1976		
		Stockholm	Sweden	2000		Converted from Katarinastation, a former power station.
Reykjavík Mosque		Reykjavík	Iceland	2002		Not a purpose-built mosque, but serves as an interim gathering site.

=== United Kingdom and Ireland ===
United Kingdom and Ireland
Building	Image	Location	Country	First built	Tradition	Notes
Shah Jahan Mosque		Woking, England	United Kingdom	1889		First purpose-built mosque; built by Gottlieb Wilhelm Leitner and partly funded by Shah Jahan Begum of Bhopal.
Liverpool Mosque and Muslim Institute		Liverpool, England	United Kingdom	1891		Several sources state that a mosque was founded in 1860 at 2 Glynrhondda Street, Cardiff, Wales. This has been rejected by an academic paper as a transcription error.
Dublin Mosque and Islamic Centre		Dublin	Ireland	1976		Later, followed by the first purpose-built mosque was built in Ballyhaunis in 1987.

=== Western Europe ===
Western-Central Europe (excluding the British Isles, Nordic countries, and countries that are also in Eastern Europe)
Building	Image	Location	Country	First built	Tradition	Notes
Père Lachaise Ottoman Mosque		Paris	France	1856		The first in Metropolitan France, served for burial prayers for Ottoman diplomats, North African military personnel, and Turkish and Arab students. It fell into disrepair when France and the Ottoman Empire went to war in 1914.
Grand Mosque of Paris		Paris	France	1926		Built in the Moroccan style and honored Muslim French veterans of World War I.
Wünsdorf Mosque		Wünsdorf, Berlin	Germany	1915		Erected by the Imperial German Army administration for Muslim Allied prisoners of war in the POW camp in Wünsdorf, later used as refugee camp. In 1930 torn down due to lack of a congregation.
Mobarak Mosque		The Hague	Netherlands	1955		The first known purpose-built mosque in the Netherlands.
Centre Islamique de Genève		Geneva	Switzerland	1961		Founded by Said Ramadan, known as the Little Mosque of Geneva.

== Americas ==
=== North America ===
North America (including Central America and island-states of the Caribbean Sea)
Building	Image	Location	Country	First built	Tradition	Notes
Al-Sadiq Mosque		Chicago, Illinois	United States	1922	Ahmadiyya	Oldest extant mosque in the Americas.
Mother Mosque of America (Moslem Temple)		Cedar Rapids, Iowa	United States	1934		Oldest extant purpose-built mosque in the United States
Al-Rashid Mosque		Edmonton, Alberta	Canada	1938		First purpose-built mosque in Canada.
		Westmoreland and Spanish Town	Jamaica	1950s		Constructed by the Islamic Society of Jamaica, which was founded in 1950.
Bridgetown Mosque		Bridgetown	Barbados	1957		First purpose-built mosque in Barbados.
Omar bin Al-Khattab Mosque		Willemstad, Curaçao	Netherlands	1965		
			Haiti	1985		Converted private residence.
Suraya Mosque		Torreón	Mexico	1989	Shi'ite	Built by the immigrants from the Middle East living in Torreón.
Omar Mosque		San José	Costa Rica	1995	Sunni	Founded by the Islamic Cultural Association of Costa Rica.
		Belize City	Belize	c. 2008		Founded by Belizeans who converted to Islam while in the United States.
Boukman Buhara Mosque		Cap-Haïtien	Haiti	2016		First purpose-built mosque in Haiti; includes a minaret. Constructed following the 2010 Haiti earthquake.

=== South America ===
South America
Building	Image	Location	Country	First built	Tradition	Notes
			Suriname	1906		Built by immigrant Javanese rice farmers, in the Netherlands colony of the time.
Mesquita Brasil		São Paulo	Brazil	1929		Previous site built in 1929; current building inaugurated in 1952. First known mosque in Brazil.
			Panama	1930	Ahmadiyya	
		El Paraíso, Caracas	Venezuela	1968		
At-Tauhid Mosque		Buenos Aires	Argentina	1983	Shi'ite	Opened in October 1983 with the support of the Embassy of the Islamic Republic of Iran to Argentina. It is a very simple building with a subtle Islamic style in its facade.
As-Salam Mosque		Santiago	Chile	1995		Commissioned 1989, inaugurated in 1995.
Mohammed VI Mosque		Coquimbo	Chile	2007		

== Oceania ==
=== Australasia ===
Australasia
Building	Image	Location	Country	First built	Tradition	Notes
Marree Mosque		Marree, South Australia	Australia	1861 / 1882		Small structure in the South Australian desert built by Australia's "Afghan" camel-drivers, has been restored.
Central Adelaide Mosque		Adelaide, South Australia	Australia	1888		The oldest major city mosque in the country.
Ponsonby Mosque		Auckland	New Zealand	1980		Cornerstone laid in 1979; the first Islamic centre in the country was installed in an Auckland house bought in 1959.

=== Melanesia ===
Melanesia
Building	Image	Location	Country	First built	Tradition	Notes
Hidayatullah Sanoek Mosque		Sanoek, South Waigeo, Raja Ampat Regency, West Papua	Indonesia	1505 (approximate)		The oldest surviving mosque in Oceania
		Vitogo, Nausori, and Tavua	Fiji	1922 (approximate)		A number of wooden mosques were built by local Islamic assemblies around 1922.
		Port Moresby	Papua New Guinea	2000		Islam was introduced to the island in the 1970s, and the first Islamic centre established in 1988.

== See also ==
- List of oldest minarets
- List of tallest minarets
- Holiest sites in Islam
- Islamic architecture
- List of mosques in India
  - Congregational mosque
  - List of largest mosques
  - List of mosques
- List of oldest known surviving buildings
- List of oldest church buildings
- List of oldest synagogues
