= Al-Shawadhna Mosque =

Historic mosque in Nizwa, Oman

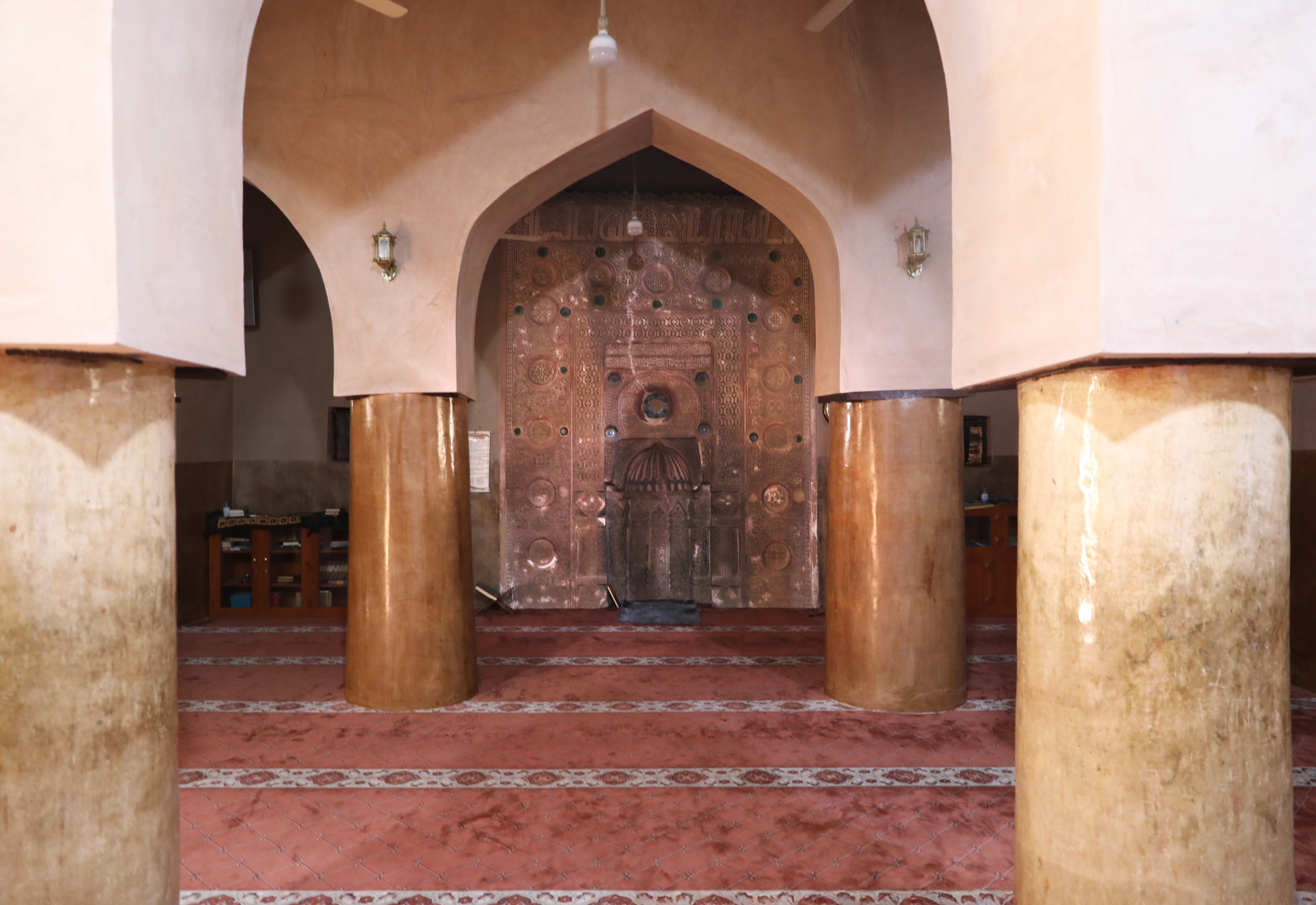
- Interior of the mosque's prayer hall

Religion
- Affiliation: Islam
- Ecclesiastical or organizational status: Mosque

Location
- Interactive map of Al-Shawadhna Mosque
- Coordinates: 22.9313°N 57.5306°E

Architecture
- Completed: 1529 (date of mihrab decoration)

The Al-Shawadhna Mosque or Al-Shawadhina Mosque (Arabic: مسجد الشواذنة), also popularly known as the Masjid al-Qiblatayn (Arabic: مسجد القبلتين, lit. 'Mosque of the Two Qiblas'), is a historic mosque in Nizwa, Oman. It is reputed to be one of the oldest mosques in Oman. Architecturally, it is notable for its well-preserved mihrab covered with carved stucco decoration from the 16th century. The mosque is located in the historic al-'Aqr neighbourhood of Nizwa.

== History ==
It is difficult to reliably date the mosque's construction due to the nature of its mudbrick architecture, which requires regular maintenance and renewal over the years. According to local tradition, the mosque was originally founded in the 7th century and was also restored in 729. The decorated mihrab inside the mosque features an inscription that contains the date 936 AH in the Islamic calendar, corresponding to 1529 CE. It also names those who sponsored work on the mosque at this time and names the craftsman as 'Isa ibn 'Abdullah ibn Yusuf.

== Architecture ==
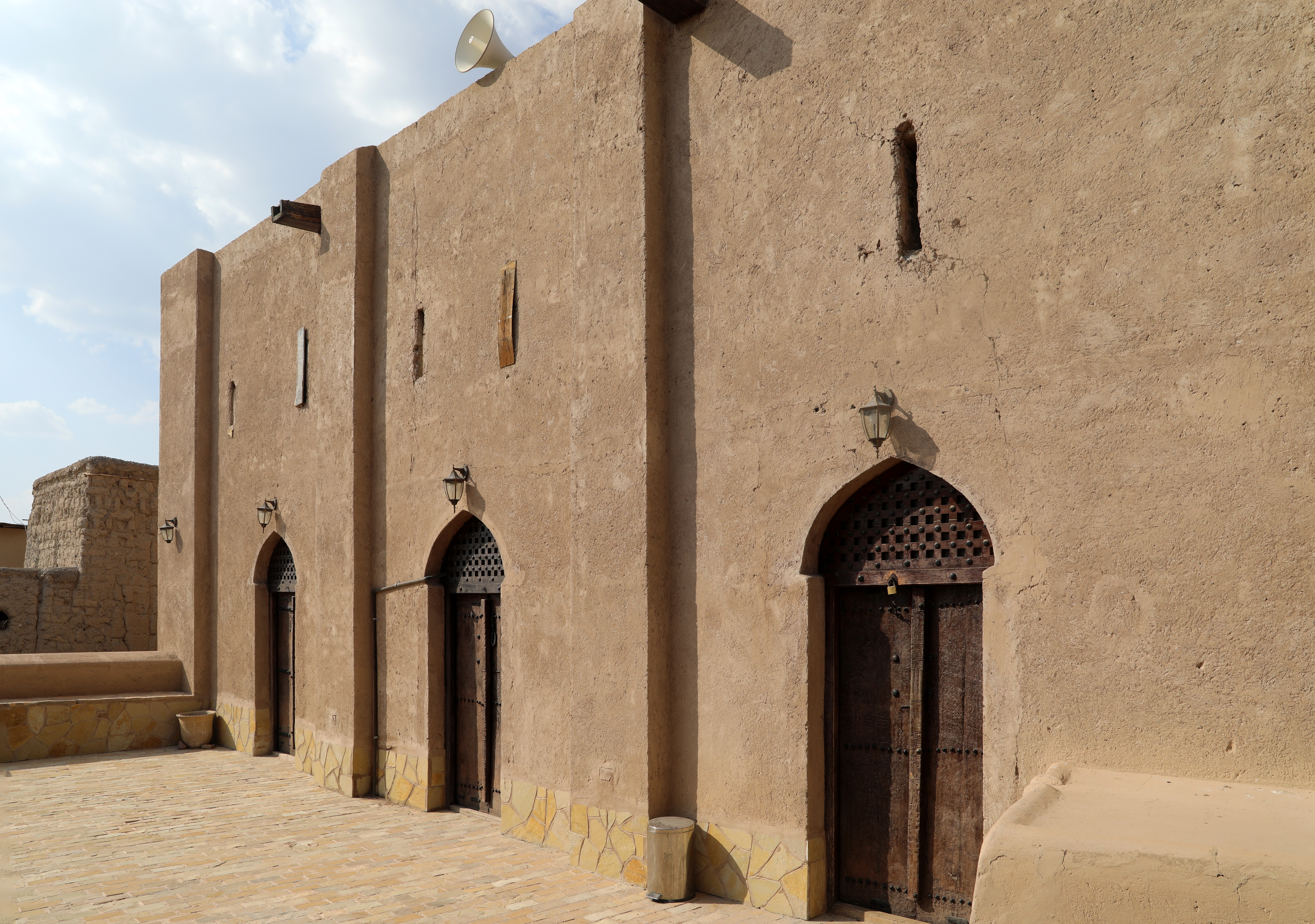
Exterior of the prayer hall, seen from the courtyard on the south side

The mosque's floor plan forms an irregular rectangle, including a prayer hall on the north side and a courtyard (sahn) on its south side. These are built on a structure that elevates them above the street level. The layout shares some general characteristics with other historic mosques in central Oman; among other things, the longer axis of the prayer hall is roughly perpendicular to the qibla wall (the wall in the direction of prayer, to the west in this case). The prayer hall is divided into three aisles by two rows of pointed arches supported by four columns, with a flat roof above.

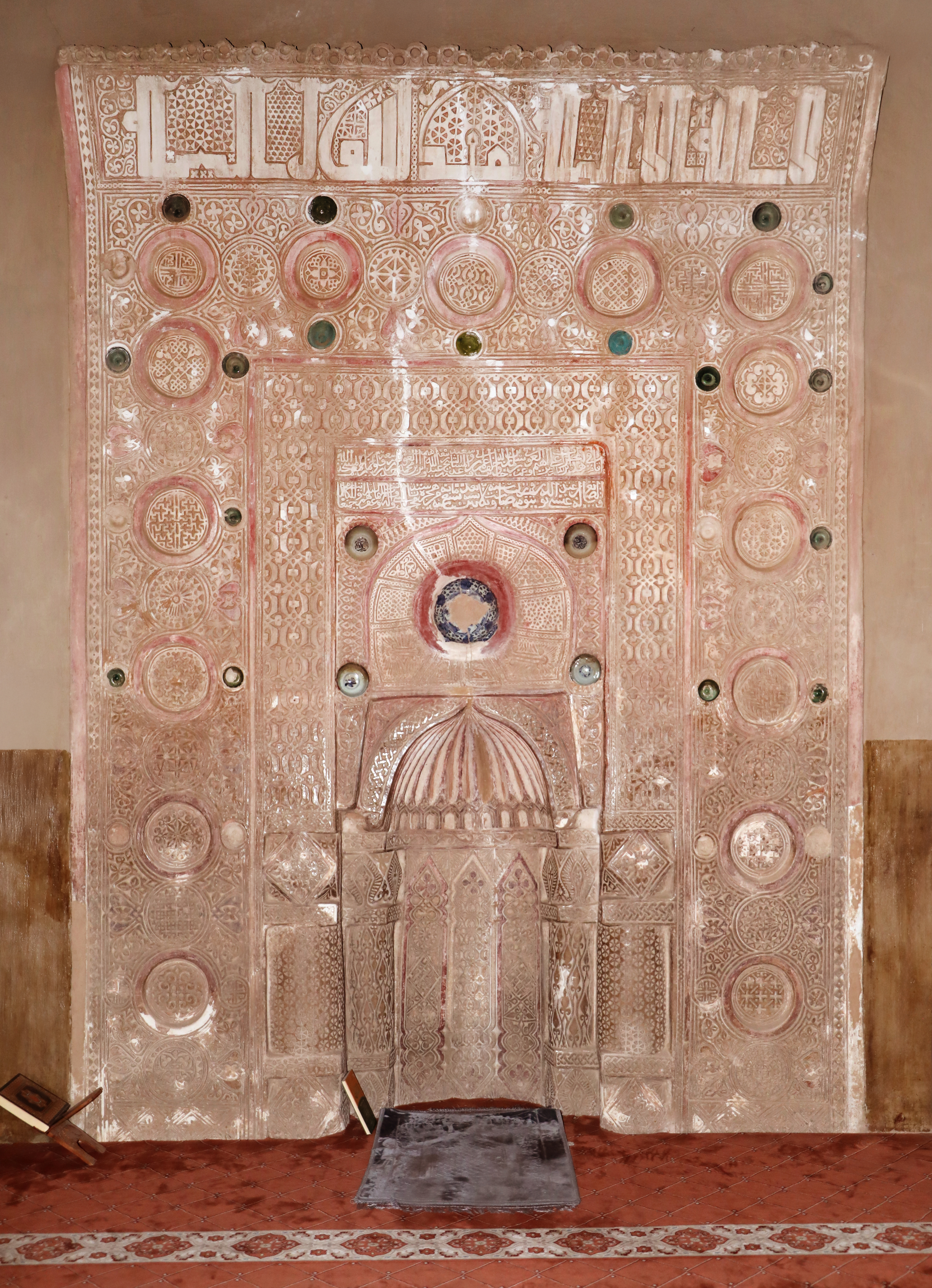
The decorated mihrab

The mosque's walls are generally undecorated, except for the mihrab (niche in the western wall of the prayer hall, symbolizing the qibla). The latter consists of a large rectangular composition in carved stucco. Multiple other historic mosques in Oman, including other mosques in and around Nizwa, feature similar decorated mihrabs. The carved decoration is divided into multiple zones featuring various geometric and highly stylized vegetal motifs. Above the concave niche in the center is an Arabic inscription in Naskhi script that records the date and the names of the craftsman and the patrons. The zone of decoration between the niche and this inscription also features five white and blue Chinese porcelain bowls that are set into the stucco decoration — a feature also found in some other Omani mosques from this same period and attested even earlier in East Africa. The frieze at the top of the mihrab decoration is slightly inclined and is carved with the shahada (the Islamic declaration of faith) in a large Kufic script.
