= Mesquita Brasil =

Mosque in São Paulo, Brazil

Mosque Brazil
- Portuguese: Mesquita Brasil
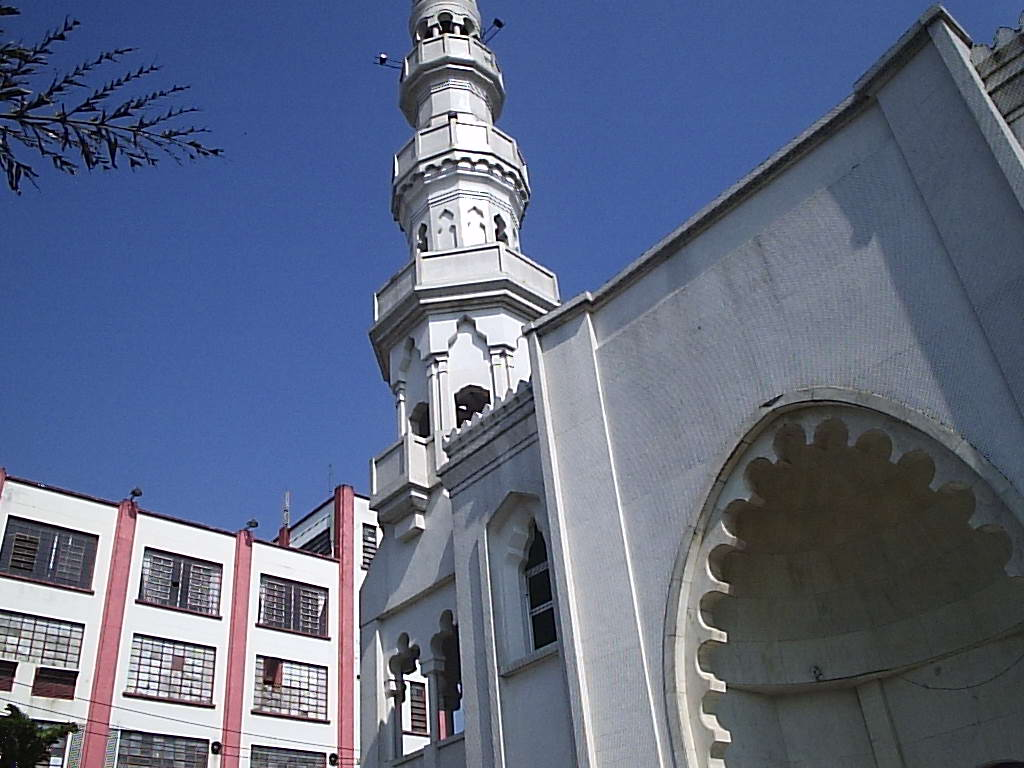
- Mesquita Brasil, in June 2007

- Location of the mosque in São Paulo

Religion
- Affiliation: Islam
- Ecclesiastical or organizational status: Mosque
- Ownership: Muslim Beneficent Society of São Paulo
- Status: Active

Location
- Location: Avenida do Estado, 5382, Cambuci, São Paulo, São Paulo (state)
- Country: Brazil
- Interactive map of Mosque Brazil
- Coordinates: 23°33′29″S 46°37′06″W

Architecture
- Type: Mosque architecture
- Founder: Muslim Beneficent Society of São Paulo
- Established: 1927 (as an organization)
- Groundbreaking: 1940
- Completed: 1960

Specifications
- Dome: One
- Minaret: One

Website
- mesquitabrasil.com.br (in Portuguese)

The Mesquita Brasil (lit. 'Mosque Brazil') is a mosque located in Cambuci, the central district of São Paulo city, Brazil. The mosque was completed in 1929 by the Muslim Beneficent Society of São Paulo. The Mesquita Brasil is the oldest mosque in Brazil and one of the oldest mosques in South America.

== History ==
The Mesquita Brasil dates from the 1920s. In the aftermath of the World War I, many Muslim immigrants arrived in São Paulo after fleeing troubles in the Middle East. In 1927, the Palestinian Muslim Charitable Society was formed by some Palestinian immigrants including Darwich Gazal and Hosni Adura. As more immigrants arrived from Syria and Lebanon, in 1929 they changed the name of the society to the Muslim Beneficent Society (SBM) of São Paulo. The Society began holding congregation prayers, initially in rented rooms in Av Rangel Pestana and Barão de Duprat in São Paulo, and then, in 1938, they acquired land and shifted prayers to the Avenue of the State.

In 1940, the Society moved permanently to the present premises at Av. Do Estado, 5,382, Cambuci, São Paulo and began construction of the Mesquita Brasil, as the first Brazilian mosque. Construction took many years and the mosque was officially inaugurated in 1960. The inauguration was attended by Arab and Brazilian officials, including H.E. Hussein Zulfaqqar Sabry, Deputy Foreign Minister of the United Arab Republic, representing the Secretary-General of the Organization of Islamic Conference (OIC).

== See also ==
- Islam in Brazil
- List of mosques in Brazil
- List of the oldest mosques
