= Tarikhaneh =

Historical mosque in Damghan, Semnan, Iran

Tarikhaneh (Tarikhaneh Mosque)
- مسجد تاریخانه
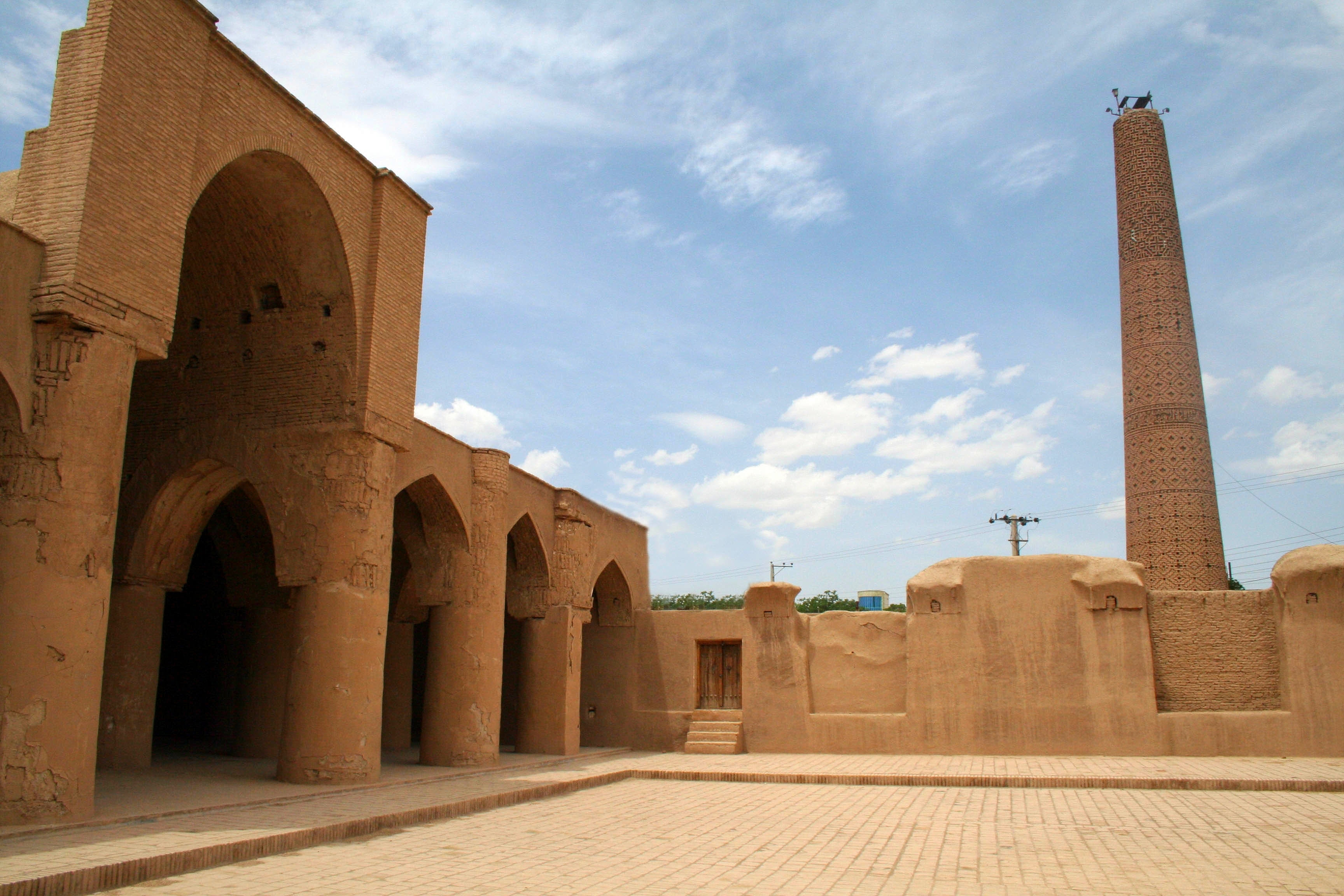
- The mosque minaret and iwan in 2008

- Location of the mosque in Iran

Religion
- Affiliation: Shia Islam
- Ecclesiastical or organisational status: Mosque
- Status: Active

Location
- Location: Mutahari Street, Damghan, Semnan Province
- Country: Iran
- Interactive map of Tarikhaneh (Tarikhaneh Mosque)
- Coordinates: 36°9′52″N 54°21′15″E

Architecture
- Type: Mosque architecture
- Style: Abbasid; Sasanian; Ziyarid (minaret)
- Completed: c. 150 AH (767/768 CE); 1027 CE (minaret)

Specifications
- Dome: 18 (maybe more)
- Minaret: One (damaged with age)
- Minaret height: 30 metres (98 ft) (est.)
- Materials: Bricks; adobe; plaster; timber

Website
- tarikhaneh.com

Iran National Heritage List
- Official name: Tarikhaneh Mosque
- Type: Mosque
- Designated: 1932
- Reference no.: 80
- Conservation organization: Cultural Heritage, Handicrafts and Tourism Organization of Iran

Tarikhaneh, or more correctly, the Tarikhaneh Mosque (Persian: مسجد تاریخانه, romanized: Masjed-e Tarikhaneh), and also variously rendered as the Tarikhana Mosque and the Tarikh Khana Mosque, (Note: Other spellings include: Tari Khaneh, Tari Khana, Tarikh Khaneh, and Tārīk Khāneh.) and also known as the Mosque of 100 Gates, is a mosque located in the historical city of Damghan, in the province of Semnan, Iran. The mosque is one of the oldest and most significant Islamic structures in Iran, estimated to date from the eighth century CE.

The mosque was added to the Iran National Heritage List on 6 January 1932, administered by the Cultural Heritage, Handicrafts and Tourism Organization of Iran and was nominated for recognition by the Islamic Educational, Scientific and Cultural Organization. Scholars debate its exact construction date, with some suggesting origins as early as the 8th century CE. Various restoration initiatives have been undertaken to maintain its structural integrity. Local authorities have advocated for increased recognition of the mosque in order to promote tourism and raise cultural awareness. As of January 2023, the mosque was in active use for worship.

== Etymology ==
In Persian, Tārīk Khāneh is derived from tārī ("god") and khāneh ("home"), thus meaning "god's home".

== History ==
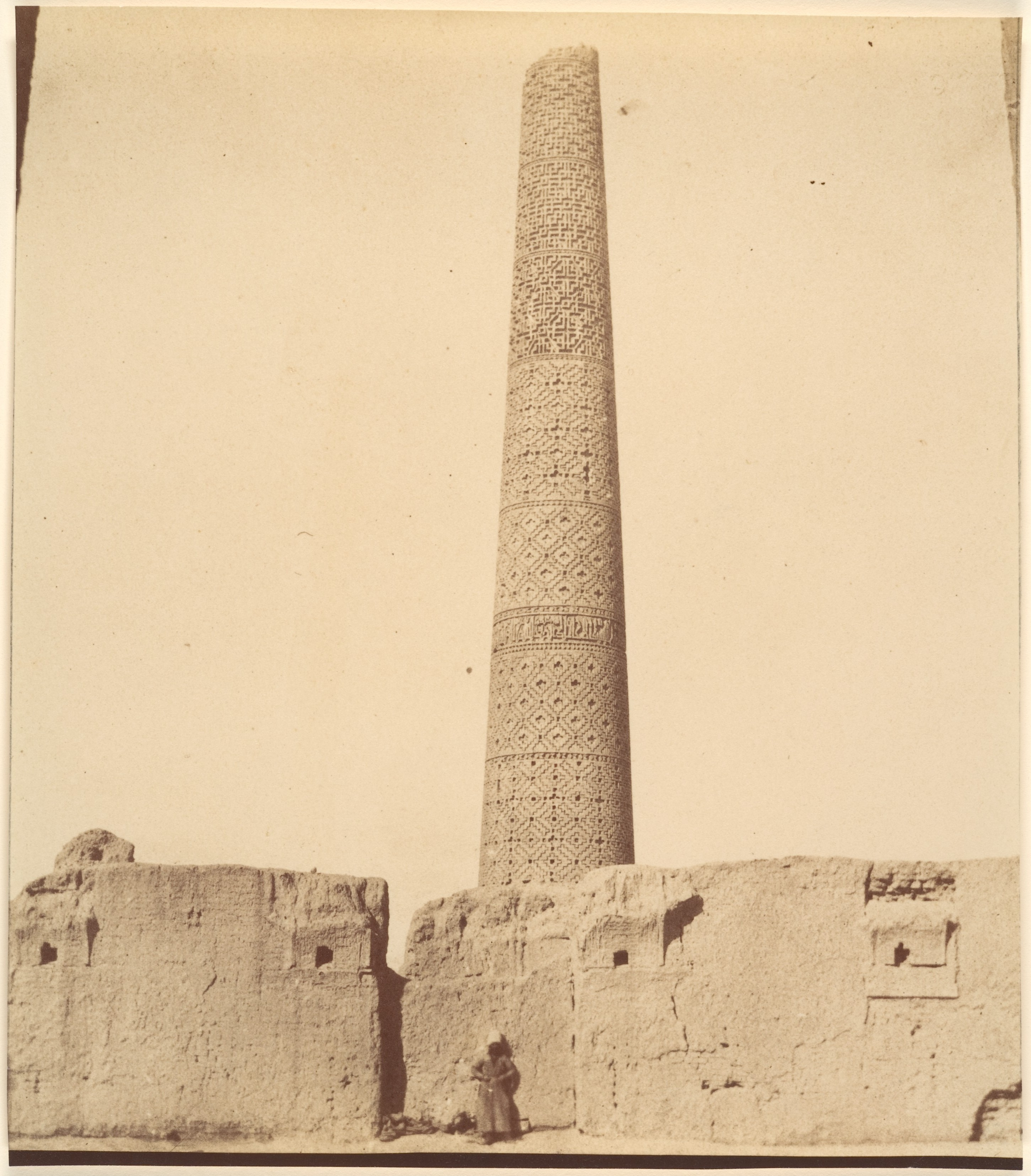
The minaret of Tarikhaneh by Luigi Pesce, 1840s–60s

Built on the site of a former Zoroastrian fire temple, the chronology of the mosque's construction is not well-documented. Scholarly discourse regarding the mosque's construction date has produced varied conclusions. Notably, historian Mohammad Karim Pirnia dates the original building's construction to c. 150 AH (767/768 CE) based on architectural styles and historical context. Other sources suggest that while no definitive inscriptions exist to confirm its age, the mosque likely predates 200 AH (815/816 CE) due to its stylistic features. Based on its very close similarities with earlier Sassanian architecture, it is likely from the first centuries of Islamic rule, possibly the 8th century CE. Some scholars have suggested that its overall form and style corresponds more to the 9th century CE.

The mosque exemplifies the architectural transition during the Islamic period, influenced by the significant cultural and religious shifts that occurred following the advent of Islam in the Iranian plateau. The introduction of Islam initiated profound changes in the region's religious, cultural, and social life, transforming pre-Islamic practices that had been dominated by Zoroastrianism and other faiths.

== Architecture ==
The courtyard plan consists of a square courtyard which is surrounded by arcades of barrel vaults supported by slightly pointed fired brick arches set on thick circular pillars, typical of Sasanian architecture. The massive circular pillars of radial brickwork, repeating the building technique used in Sassanian palaces, are 3.5 metres (11 ft) tall and almost 2 metres (6 ft 7 in) in diameter. They are an almost unique survival of a structural form deriving from the same source as the vast arch of Ctesiphon. The hypostyle prayer hall consists of several naves or aisles divided by arcades and covered by vaults, with the central nave being larger than the others. The building is essentially Sasanian in style, material, and building technique with the only innovation being the slightly pointed arches. According to Arthur Pope, "It expresses dignity and confidence, but also humility."

While the Tarikhaneh Mosque exhibits strong Sasanian architectural influences in its form and materials, its Islamic function fundamentally alters its character. The mosque's design features a simple, uncluttered space oriented towards the qibla, marked by the mihrab. This emphasis on horizontal expanse accommodates large congregations. In essence, the Tarikhaneh Mosque demonstrates how Sasanian architectural forms were adapted and reinterpreted to serve the unique spiritual and communal needs of Islamic worship, resulting in a new and distinct architectural expression. An aerial image of the mosque, published in 2023, revealed that there were 18 small domes above the prayer hall.

Standing together at a distance from the mosque are the remains of a square column of uncertain date, possibly part of the original construction period and a cylindrical minaret. The latter was built sometime in the years 1026 to 1028 CE. It resembles the style of later Seljuk minarets. The minaret is 4.2 metres (14 ft) in diameter; its top has fallen, but originally must have measured more than 30 metres (98 ft) high, with a gallery supported on muqarnas corbels. The tower is strikingly divided into six zones of ornamentation, each rendered in brick with a different geometric pattern. An inscription at around mid-way up the tower records that its construction was commissioned by the local governor, Abu Harb Bakhtyar ibn Muhammad.

== Gallery ==
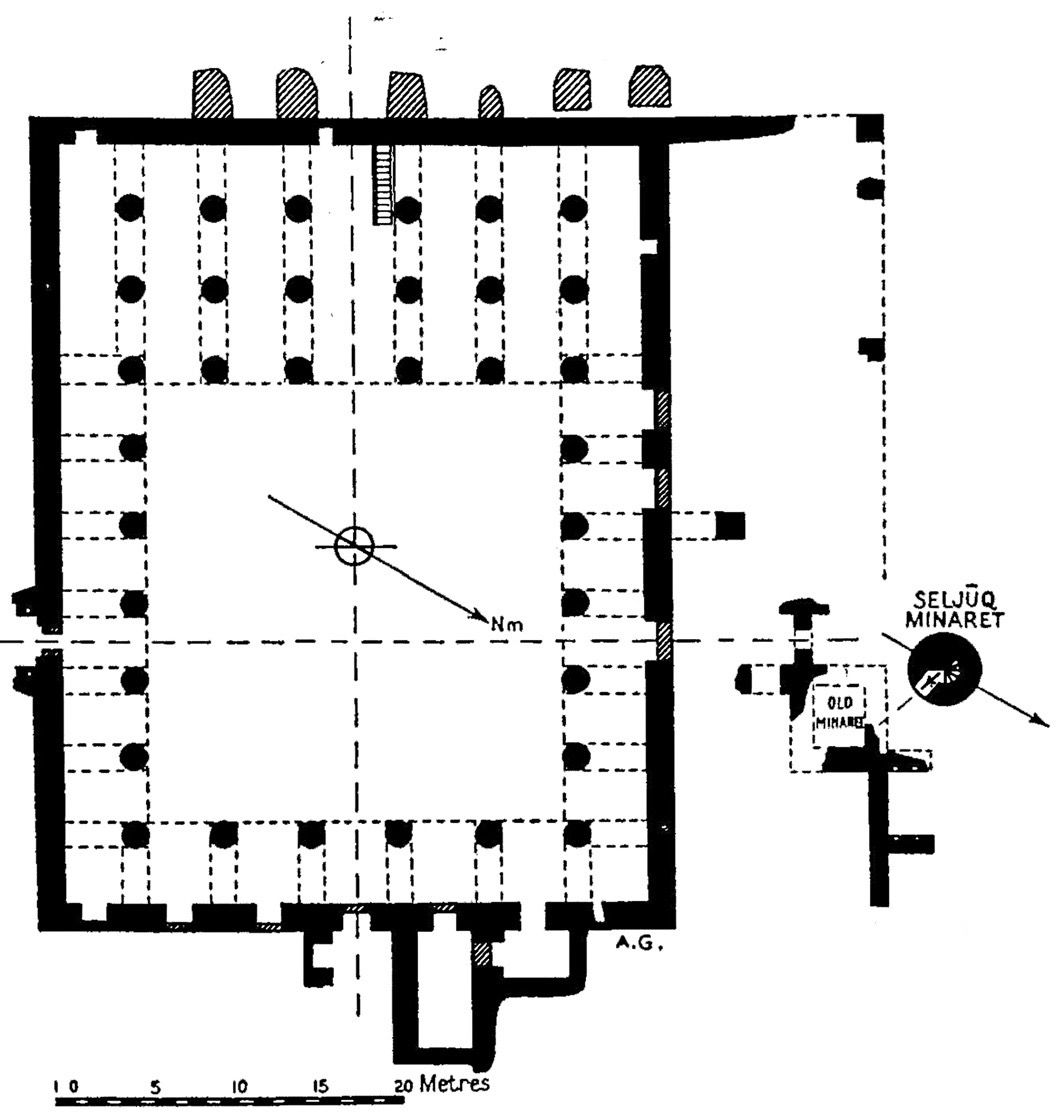
Floor plan by André Godard

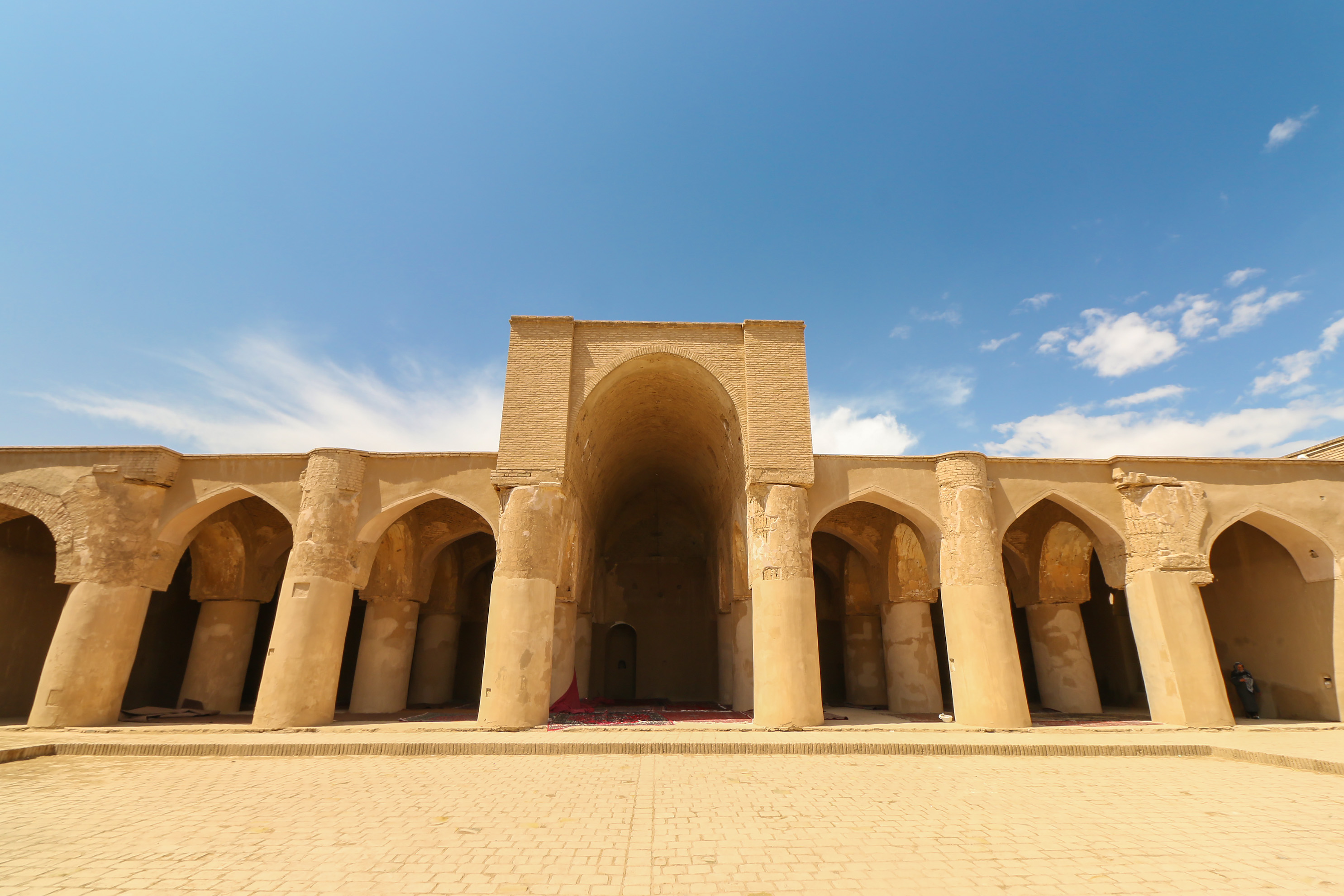
View from the courtyard to the prayer hall

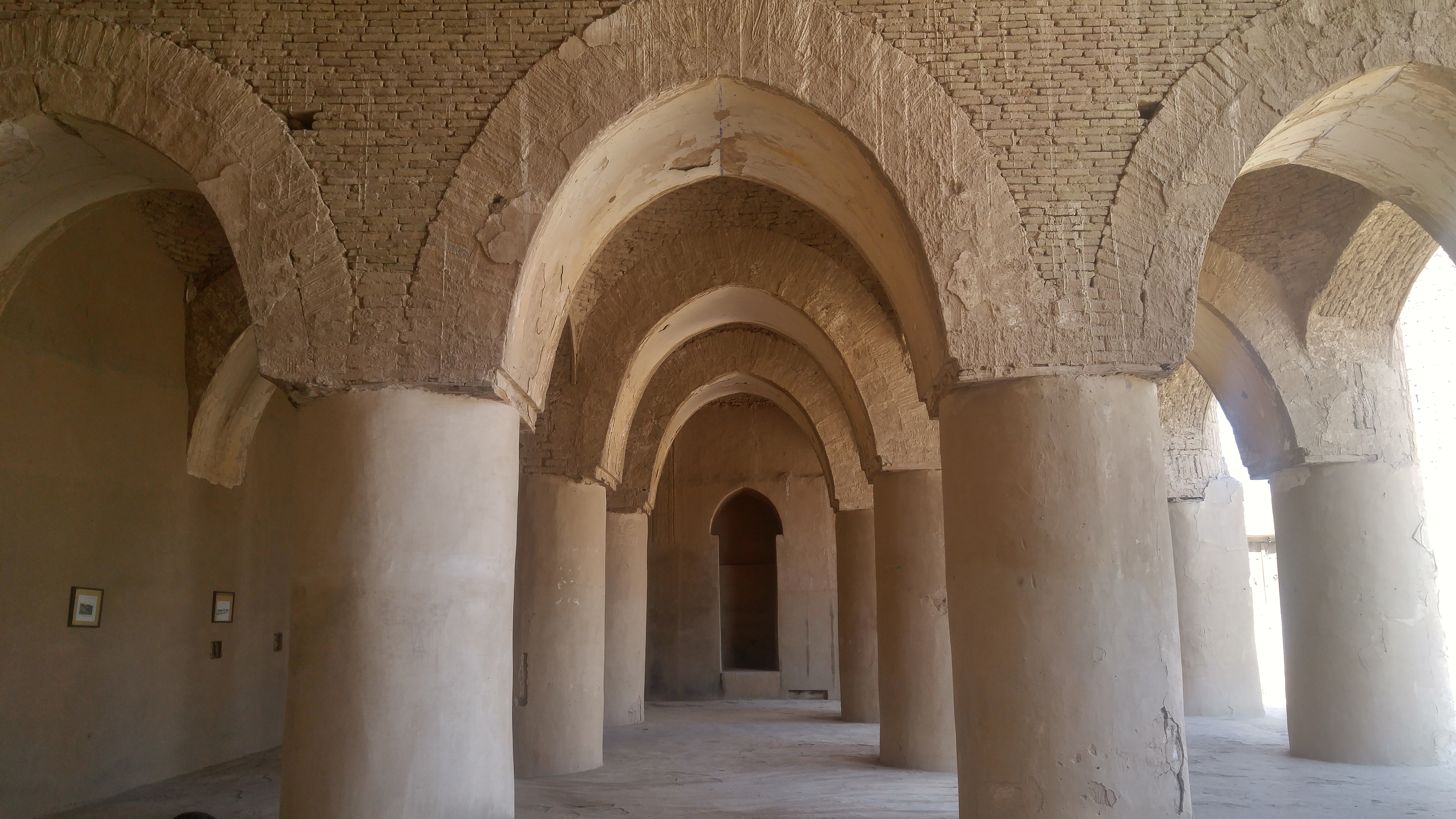
Columns and arches of the prayer hall

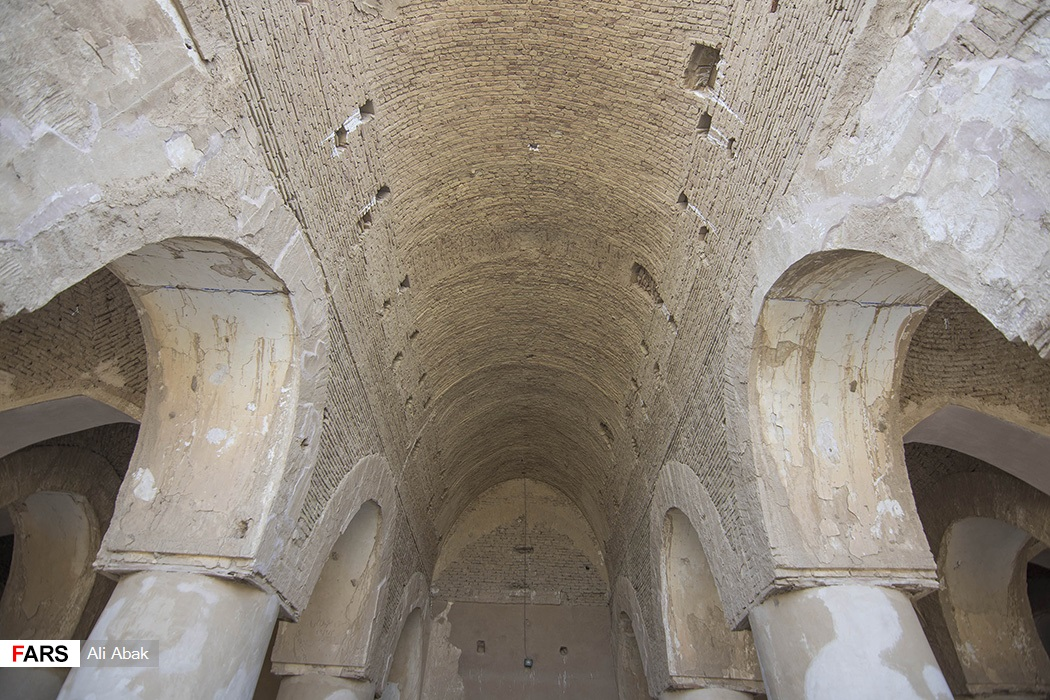
Vault over the central nave of the prayer hall

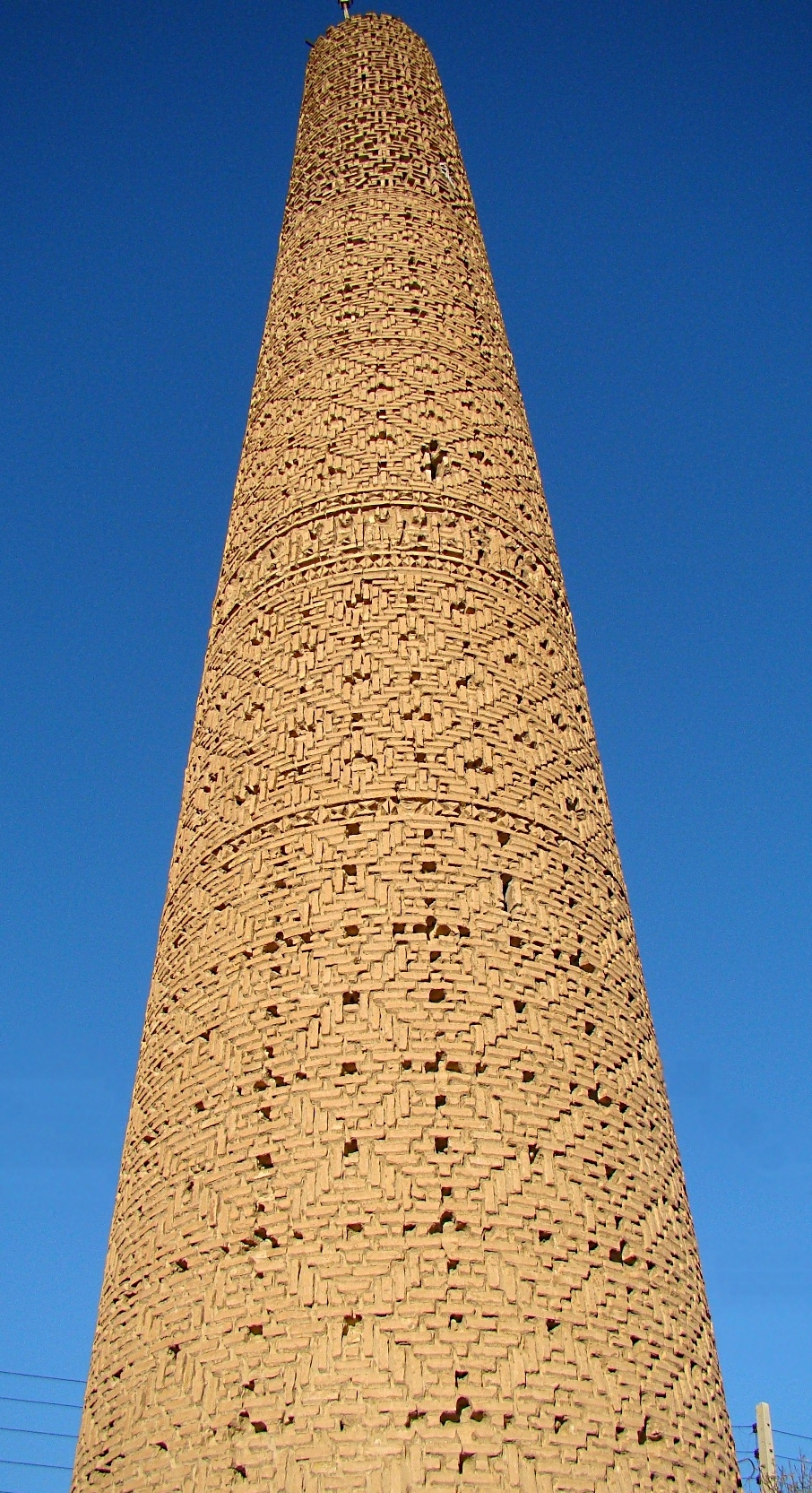
The minaret, Ziyarid dynasty, 1026‒1032.

== See also ==
- Shia Islam in Iran
- List of mosques in Iran
- List of oldest mosques in Iran
