= Maria Bethânia discography =

Brazilian Singer

Maria Bethânia albums discography
- Studio albums: 34
- Extended plays: 2
- Live albums: 15
- Singles: 2
- Box sets: 2
- Soundtracks and collaborations: 65

The discography of Brazilian singer Maria Bethânia consists of 34 studio albums, 15 live albums, several participations in movie and telenovela soundtracks as well as numerous collaborations with other artists.

== Albums ==
=== Studio albums ===
- 1965 - Maria Bethânia - Sony Music/RCA
- 1967 - Edu e Bethânia - Universal Music/Elenco
- 1969 - Maria Bethânia - EMI
- 1971 - A Tua Presença... - Universal Music/Philips/Polygram
- 1971 - Vinicius + Bethânia + Toquinho - en La Fusa (Mar de Plata) - RGE
- 1972 - Drama - Universal Music/Philips/Polygram
- 1976 - Pássaro proibido - Universal Music/Philips/Polygram
- 1977 - Pássaro da manhã - Universal Music/Philips/Polygram
- 1978 - Álibi - Universal Music/Philips/Polygram
- 1979 - Mel - Universal Music/Philips/Polygram
- 1980 - Talismã - Universal Music/Philips/Polygram
- 1981 - Alteza - Universal Music/Philips/Polygram
- 1983 - Ciclo - Universal Music/Philips/Polygram
- 1984 - A beira e o mar - Universal Music/Philips/Polygram
- 1987 - Dezembros - Sony Music/RCA
- 1988 - Maria - Sony Music/RCA
- 1989 - Memória da pele - Universal Music/Polygram
- 1990 - 25 anos - Universal Music/Polygram
- 1992 - Olho d'água - Universal Music/Polygram
- 1993 - As canções que você fez pra mim - Universal Music/Polygram
- 1993 - Las canciones que hiciste para mí - Philips-PolyGram
- 1996 - Âmbar - EMI
- 1999 - A força que nunca seca - Sony Music
- 2001 - Maricotinha - Sony Music
- 2003 - Cânticos, preces, súplicas à Senhora dos jardins do céu na voz de Maria Bethânia - Sony Music/Biscoito Fino
- 2003 - Brasileirinho - Quitanda
- 2005 - Que falta você me faz - Músicas de Vinicius de Moraes - Biscoito Fino
- 2006 - Pirata - Quitanda
- 2006 - Mar de Sophia - Biscoito Fino
- 2007 - Omara Portuondo e Maria Bethânia - Biscoito Fino
- 2009 - Encanteria - Quitanda
- 2009 - Tua - Biscoito Fino
- 2012 - Oásis de Bethânia - Biscoito Fino
- 2014 - (O Vento Lá Fora) (with Cleonice Berardinelli) - Quitanda
- 2015 - Meus quintais - Biscoito Fino
- 2019 - Mangueira: a menina dos meus olhos - Biscoito Fino/ Quitanda
- 2021 - Noturno - Biscoito Fino

=== Live albums ===
- 1968 - Recital na Boite Barroco - EMI
- 1970 - Maria Bethânia Ao vivo - EMI
- 1971 - Rosa dos ventos Ao vivo - Universal Music/Philips/Polygram
- 1973 - Drama 3º ato - Universal Music/Philips/Polygram
- 1974 - Cena muda - Universal Music/Philips/Polygram
- 1975 - Chico Buarque & Maria Bethânia ao vivo - Universal Music/Philips/Polygram
- 1976 - Doces Bárbaros - Universal Music/Philips/Polygram
- 1978 - Maria Bethânia e Caetano Veloso - ao vivo - Universal Music/Philips/Polygram
- 1982 - Nossos Momentos - Universal Music/Philips/Polygram
- 1995 - Maria Bethânia: Ao vivo - Universal Music/Polygram
- 1997 - Imitação da Vida - EMI
- 1998 - Diamante Verdadeiro - Sony Music
- 2002 - Maricotinha: Ao Vivo - Biscoito Fino
- 2007 - Dentro Do Mar Tem Rio - Biscoito Fino
- 2010 - Amor, Festa, Devoção - Biscoito Fino
- 2012 - Noite Luzidia - Biscoito Fino
- 2013 - Carta de Amor - Biscoito Fino
- 2015 - Brasileirinho - Quitanda
- 2016 - Tempo, Tempo, Tempo, Tempo - Biscoito Fino
- 2016 - Abraçar e Agradecer - Biscoito Fino
- 2018 - De Santo Amaro a Xerém (with Zeca Pagodinho) - Biscoito Fino
- 2025 - Caetano e Bethânia Ao Vivo (with Caetano Veloso) - Sony

=== Box sets ===
- 2011 - Box Maria - Universal Music
- 2011 - Box Bethânia - Universal Music

== Soundtracks and collaborations ==
- Quando o Carnaval Chegar Movie Soundtrack, on tracks Baioque and Bom Conselho by Chico Buarque, and on tracks Minha Embaixada Chegou, by Assis Valente and Formosa, by Nássara and J. Rui, featuring Nara Leão – Phonogram, 1972
- Nova Bossa Nova Festival Folklore e Bossa Nova do Brasil 72, on tracks Bodocó by Gordurinha and Não Tem Solução by Dorival Caymmi with Terra Trio – MPS Records, Germany, 1972
- Phono 73, on track Oração a Mãe Menininha by Dorival Caymmi featuring Gal Costa; Preciso Aprender a Só Ser, by Gilberto Gil featuring Gilberto Gil himself and on Trampolim by Caetano and Bethânia, with Caetano Veloso – Polygram, volume 3, 1973
- Gabriela Soundtrack, on track Coração Ateu by Sueli Costa – Som Livre, 1975
- Erasmo Carlos Convida, on track Cavalgada by Erasmo Carlos and Roberto Carlos – Polygram, 1980
- Sorriso Negro, by Dona Yvonne Lara, on track A Sereia Guiomar by Yvonne Lara and Delcio Carvalho – WEA, 1981
- Roberto Carlos, on track Amiga by Roberto Carlos and Erasmo Carlos – CBS, 1982
- Plunct, Plact, Zuuum, on track Brincar de Viver by Guilherme Arantes and Jon Lucien – Som Livre, Various, 1983
- Luz e Esplendor, by Elizeth Cardoso, on track Elizetheana with Alcione, Cauby Peixoto, Dona Ivone Lara, Joyce, Nana Caymmi and Paulinho da Viola – ARCA SOM, 1984
- Da cor do Brasil, by Alcione, on track Roda Ciranda by Martinho da Vila – RCA, 1984
- Nordeste Já, on tracks Chega de Mágoa, and Seca d’Água, based on a poem by Patativa do Assaré – Continental, various, 1985
- Sinceramente Teu, by Joan Manuel Serrat, on track Sinceramente Teu by Santiago Kovadoff – Ariola, 1986
- Negro Demais no Coração, by Joyce, on track Tarde em Itapoã, by Vinícius de Moraes and Toquinho – CBS, 1988
- Uns, by Caetano Veloso, on track Salva Vida by Caetano Veloso – Polygram, 1989
- Nelson Gonçalves e Convidados, on track Caminhemos by Herivelto Martins – RCA, 1989
- A trilha Sonora África Brasil, on track Mamãe Oxum by André Luiz Oliveira and Costa Netto – EMI, 1989
- Brasil, by João Gilberto, Caetano Veloso and Gilberto Gil, on track No Tabuleiro da Baiana by Ary Barroso – WEA, 1991
- Songbook Noel Rosa, on track Pela Décima Vez by Noel Rosa – Lumiar Discos, 1991
- No Tom da Mangueira, on tracks Primavera and Cântico à Natureza by Nelson Sargento, Alfredo Português and Jamelão, with the vocal group Garganta Profunda – Saci, various, 1993
- Sambas de Enredo Grupo Especial, 1994 Carnival, on track Atrás da Verde-e-Rosa só não vai quem já morreu by David Corrêa, Paulinho Carvalho, Carlos Sena and Bira do Ponto, with Caetano Veloso, Gilberto Gil and Gal Costa – RCA, 1993
- Dorival, on track Morena do Mar by Dorival Caymmi – Columbia, vários, 1994
- João Batista do Vale, by João do Vale, on track Estrela Miúda by João do Vale and Luiz Vieira – RCA, 1994
- Gente de Festa, by Margareth Menezes, on track Libertar by Roberto Mendes and J. Velloso – Continental, 1995
- Brasil em Cy, by Quarteto em Cy on track A Noite do Meu Bem by Dolores Duran – CID, 1996
- Belô Velloso, on track Brincando by Mabel Velloso e Alexandre Leão – Velas, 1996
- Recife Frevo é, on track Frevo nº 01 de Recife by Antonio Maria – Virgin, vários, 1996
- Alfagamabetizado, by Carlinhos Brown on track Quixabeira by domínio popular, with Caetano Veloso, Gilberto Gil e Gal Costa – EMI, 1996
- Agora, by Orlando Moraes on track A Montanha e a Chuva by Orlando Moraes – Som Livre, 1997
- Songbook Djavan, on track Morena de Endoidecer by Djavan and Cacaso – Lumiar discos, 1997
- Álbum Musical, by Francis Hime, on track Pássara de Francis Hime and Chico Buarque – WEA, 1997
- Amigos, by Angela Maria, on track Orgulho by Nelson Wederkind and Waldir Rocha – Columbia, 1997
- Livro, by Caetano Veloso, on track Navio Negreiro from a poem by Castro Alves – Polygram, 1997
- Pequeno Oratório do Poeta para o Anjo, poems by Neide Archanjo
- Agô – Pixinguinha 100 anos, on track Fala Baixinho by Pixinguinha and Hermínio Bello de Carvalho – Som Livre, various, 1997
- Diplomacia, by Batatinha on track Bolero by Batatinha and Roque Ferreira – Emi, 1998
- Songbook Marcos Valle, on track Preciso Aprender a Ser Só by Paulo Sérgio Valle and Marcos Valle – Lumiar Discos, 1998
- Brasil são outros 500, on track Tocando em Frente by Almir Sater and Renato Teixeira, new version featuring actress Vera Holtz – Som Livre, 1998
- Alcione Celebração, on track Linda Flor by Luiz Peixoto, Marques Porto, Henrique Vogeler and Cândido Costa – Polygram, 1998
- Songbook Chico Buarque, on tracks Até Pensei by Chico Buarque and Sobre Todas as Coisas by Chico buarque and Edu Lobo – Lumiar Discos, 1999
- Sinfonia de Pardais, in honor to Herivelto Martins, on track Segredo by Herivelto Martins and Marino Pinto – Som Livre, various, 1999
- Doces Bárbaros Bahia, on track 'Hino do Esporte Clube Bahia' (Adroaldo Ribeiro Costa), with Gal Costa, Gilberto Gil and Caetano Veloso – 2000
- Chico Buarque e as cidades, on track Olhos nos Olhos by Chico Buarque – DVD, directed by José Henrique Fonseca – BMG, 2000
- Nelson Gonçalves Movie Soundtrack, on track 'Caminhemos' (Herivelto Martins), with Nelson Gonçalves – 2001
- Ana Carolina, on track Dadivosa by Ana Carolina, Neusa Pinheiro and Adriana Calcanhoto – and on the sample of the text Antônio Bivar Era uma Vez – BMG, 2001
- Eu vim da Bahia, on tracks É um Tempo de Guerra by Augusto Boal, Gianfrancesco Guarnieri and Edu Lobo, Gloria in excelsis (Missa agrária), by Gianfrancesco Guarnieri and Carlos Lyra and on De Manhã by Caetano Veloso – BMG Brasil, 2002
- Doutor do baião (tributo a Humberto Teixeira), on track 'Asa Branca' by (Luiz Gonzaga and Humberto Teixeira) - 2003
- Alcione ao vivo 2, by Alcione, on track 'Ternura Antiga' (Dolores Duran), with Alcione - 2003
- Todo Acústico, by Joanna, on track 'Maninha' (Chico Buarque and Vinícius de Moraes), with Joanna - 2003
- Pequeno oratório do poeta para o anjo, by Neide Arcanjo, narrating all tracks (Introduçtion; era o mar e parecia ser o mar. Era o mar.; Era a quimera e parecia ser o amor. Era a quimera.; Era o caule e parecia ser a flor. Era o caule.; Era a beleza e parecia ser a beleza. Era a beleza.) - 2004
- Namorando a Rosa (tribute to Rosinha de Valença), on track 'Chuá-chuá' (Ary Pavão and Pedro de Sá Pereira), with Joanna - 2005
- 2 Filhos de Francisco Movie Soundtrack, on track 'Tristeza do jeca' (Angelino de Oliveira), with Caetano Veloso - 2005
- ODE DESCONTÍNUA E REMOTA PARA FLAUTA E OBOÉ (DE ARIANA PARA DIONÍSIO) - Poems by Hilda Hilst with music by Zeca Baleiro, on track ‘Canção III’ - 2006
- A Hora da Estrela Movie, by Clarice Lispector - Maria Bethânia reads the author's dedication on the narrated version of the book - 2006
- Olivia Byington, homonymous CD by Olivia Byington; Maria Bethânia participates on Mãe Quelé theme - 2006
- Menino do Rio, by Mart'nália, on track 'São Sebastião' (Totonho Villeroy) - 2006
- 100 anos de frevo, on track 'Frevo nº 1 do Recife' (Antônio Maria) - 2007
- Senhora raiz, by Roberta Miranda, on track 'Guacira' (Hekel Tavares and Joracy Camargo), with Roberta Miranda - 2008
- Multishow Registro - Pode Entrar, by Ivete Sangalo, on track 'Muito Obrigado, Axé' (Carlinhos Brown), with Ivete Sangalo - 2009
- Tecnomacumba - A tempo e ao vivo, by Rita Ribeiro on track 'Iansã' (Gilberto Gil and Caetano Veloso), with Rita Ribeiro - 2009
- Canta o samba da Bahia ao vivo, by Beth Carvalho, on track 'De manhã' (Caetano veloso), with Beth Carvalho and Caetano Veloso - 2009
- Multishow Registro - N9ve + 1, by Ana Carolina on track 'Eu que não sei quase nada do mar' (Ana Carolina), with Ana Carolina - 2009
- Insensato coração Telenovela Soundtrack), on track 'Trocando em miúdos (Chico Buarque) - 2011
- Salve São Francisco, by Geraldo Azevedo on track 'Carranca que chora' (Geraldo Azevedo and Capinan), with Geraldo Azevedo - 2011
- Duas Faces - Jam Session, by Alcione on track 'Sem mais adeus' (Vinícius de Moraes and Francis Hime), with Alcione - 2011
- The Rough Guide To Voodoo, contributed track "Canto De Oxum" - 2013

== Music videos ==
Year	Title	Album	Director(s)
1990	"Da Cor Brasileira"	Mel	—N/a
1993	"As Canções Que Você Fez Pra Mim"	As Canções Que Você Fez Pra Mim	—N/a
1999	"Resto de Mim "	A Força Que Nunca Seca	Roberto Mendes and Ana Basbaum

== Video albums ==
=== Concert tour videos ===
Year	Title	Album details
1995	As Canções Que Você Fez Pra Mim - Ao Vivo	Released: 1995; Studio: Polygram Video; Label: Polygram · Universal Music; Format: VHS · DVD
2003	Maricotinha - Ao Vivo	Released: April 28, 2003; Studio: Sarapuí Produções Artísticas; Label: Biscoito Fino; Format: DVD
2004	Brasileirinho - Ao Vivo	Released: August 24, 2004; Studio: Multishow; Label: Quitanda · Biscoito Fino; Format: DVD
2005	Tempo Tempo Tempo Tempo	Released: December 9, 2005; Studio: Sarapuí Produções Artísticas; Label: Biscoito Fino; Format: DVD
2008	Omara Portuondo e Maria Bethânia - Ao Vivo	Released: October 9, 2008; Studio: Sarapuí Produções Artísticas; Label: Montuno · Biscoito Fino; Format: DVD
2009	Dentro Do Mar Tem Rio - Ao Vivo	Released: June 5, 2009; Studio: Sarapuí Produções Artísticas; Label: Biscoito Fino; Format: DVD · Blu-ray
2010	Amor Festa Devoção - Ao Vivo	Released: November 12, 2010; Studio: Sarapuí Produções Artísticas; Label: Biscoito Fino; Format: DVD · Blu-ray
2011	Noite Luzidia	Released: November 29, 2012; Studio: Sarapuí Produções Artísticas; Label: Biscoito Fino; Format: DVD

=== As featured artist ===
- Ana Carolina - Estampado
- Concertos MPBR
- Alcione - Ao vivo 2
- Chico César - Cantos e encontros de uns tempos pra cá
- Beth Carvalho canta o samba da Bahia
- Martn'ália - Eu Sei Que Vou Te Amar / Soneto do Corifeu" (Includes citation: Soneto do Corifeu) (in Mart'nália Canta Vinicius de Moraes)
- Tecnomacumba
