= Latin Grammy Award for Best Portuguese Language Roots Album =

Music award category

- Awarded for: Vocal or instrumental Portuguese Language Roots albums containing at least 51% playing time of newly recorded material. For Solo artists, duos or groups.
- Country: United States
- Presented by: The Latin Recording Academy
- First award: 2000
- Currently held by: João Gomes, Mestrinho and Jota.pê for Dominguinho (2025)
- Website: latingrammy.com

The Latin Grammy Award for Best Portuguese Language Album is an honor presented annually at the Latin Grammy Awards, a ceremony that recognizes excellence and creates a wider awareness of the cultural diversity and contributions of Latin recording artists in the United States and internationally.

According to the category description guide for the 13th Latin Grammy Awards, the award is for vocal or instrumental Portuguese Language Roots albums containing at least 51% playing time of newly recorded material. For Solo artists, duos or groups.

The category was first presented as Best Brazilian Roots/Regional Album. In 2009 the category was divided in Best Native Brazilian Roots Album and Best Tropical Brazilian Roots Album, with the latter being discontinued the following year. The former category continued until 2012 when it was renamed into Best Brazilian Roots Album. The category was changed to its current name in 2018.

In 2001, As Canções de Eu Tu Eles by Gilberto Gil became the first album to win this award and to be nominated for Album of the Year. Gilberto Gil and Renato Teixeira hold the record of most wins in the category with three wins each. Teixeira has won in collaboration with Sérgio Reis in 2015 and alongside Almir Sater in 2016 and 2018.

== Recipients ==
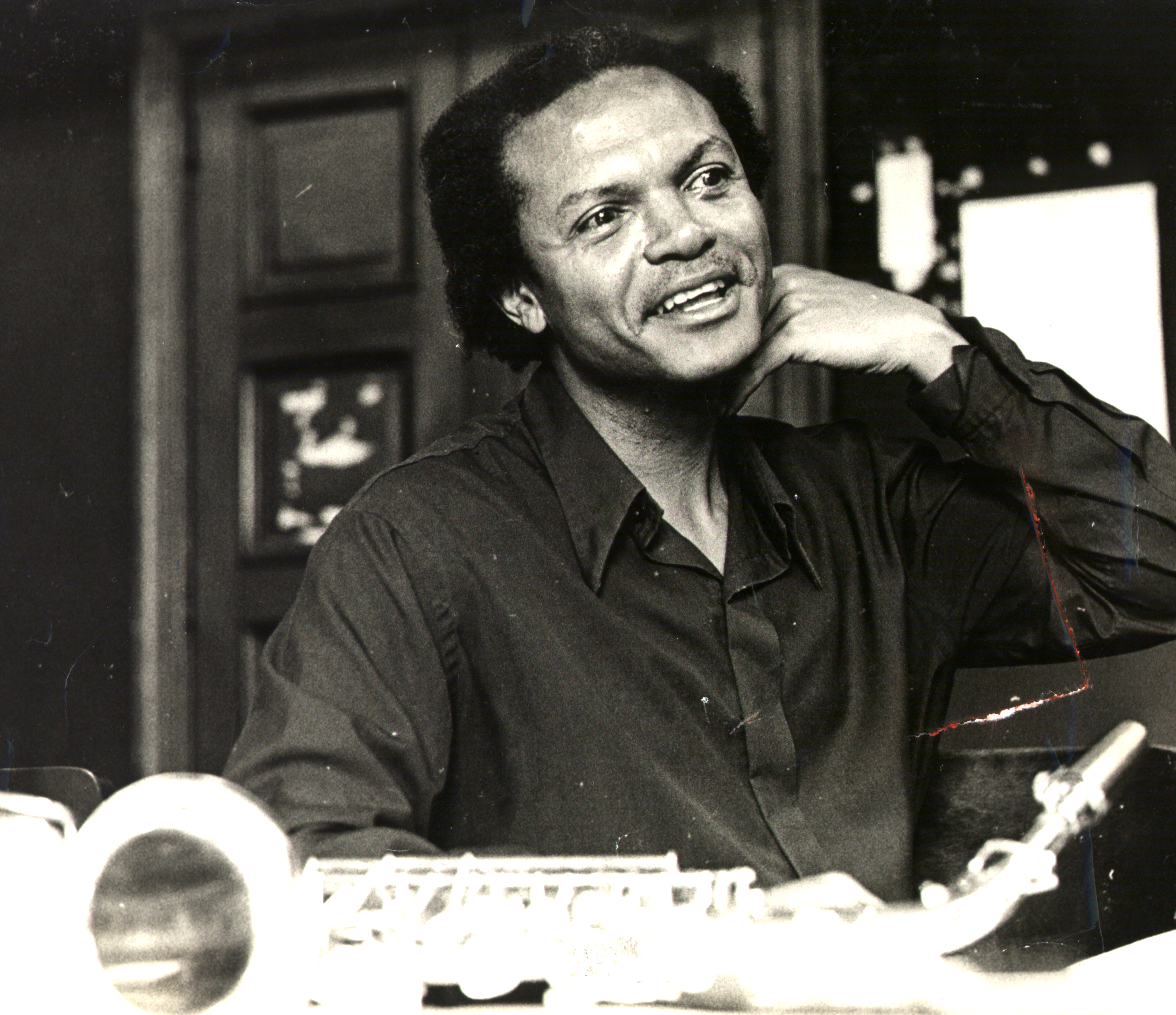
Paulo Moura was the first winner in 2000 for Pixinguinha.

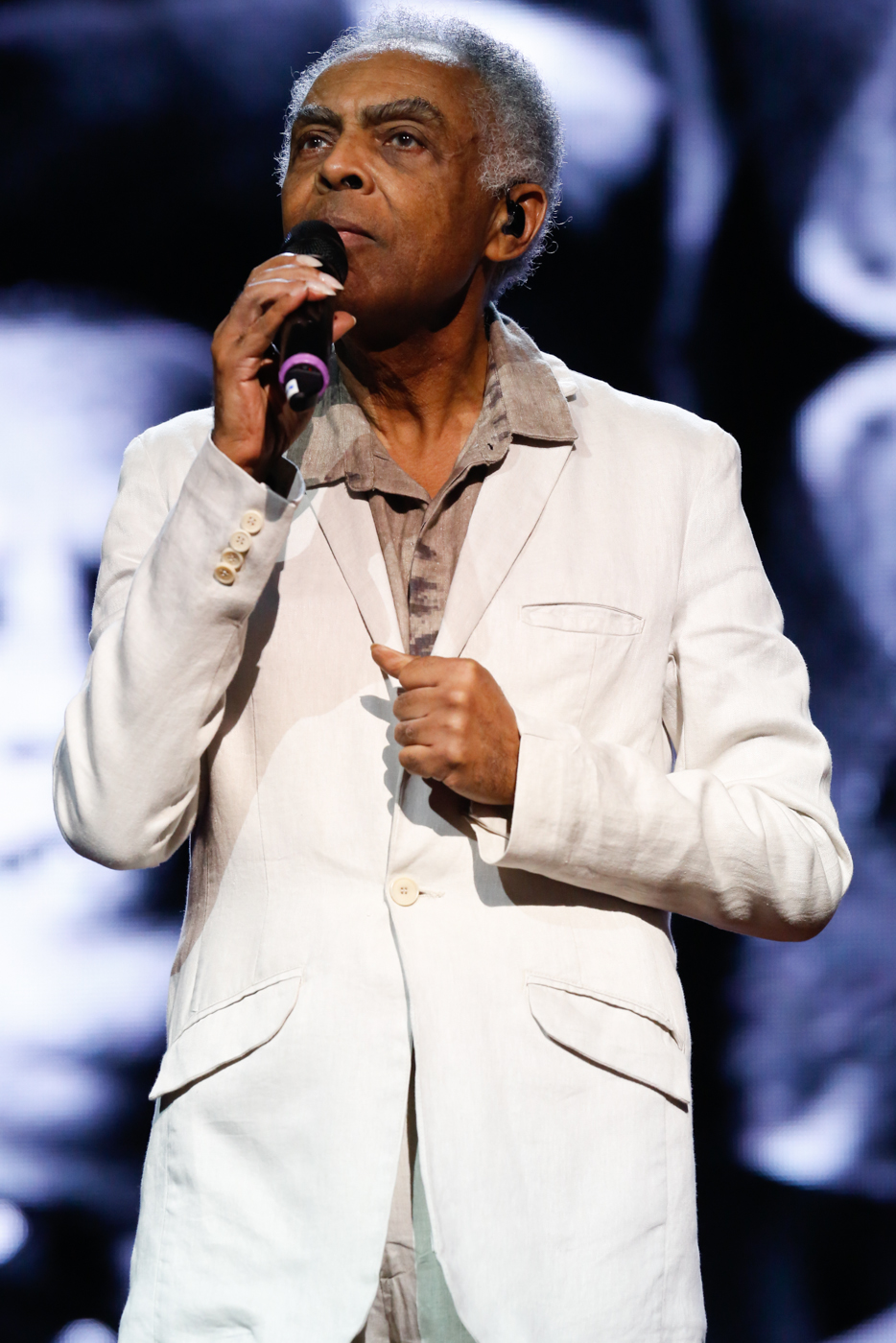
Gilberto Gil has won three times, in 2001, 2002 and 2010, the latter being for Best Native Brazilian Roots Album.

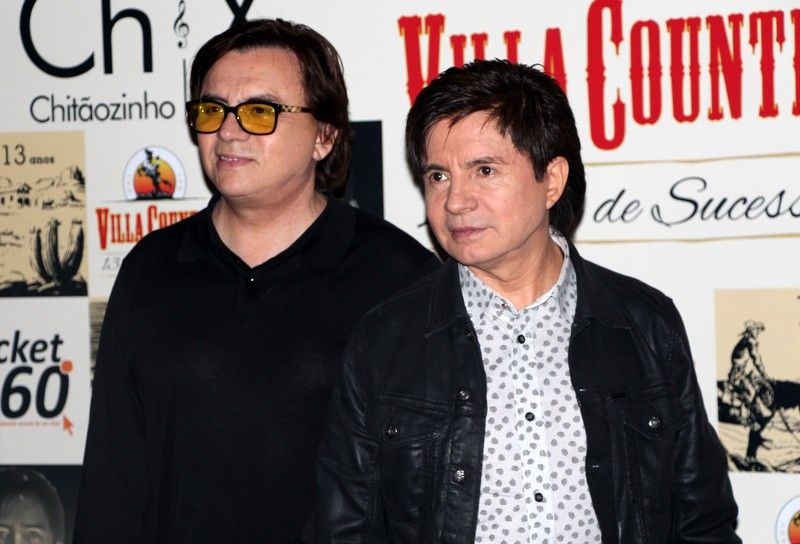
Chitãozinho & Xororó have won twice, in 2006 and 2008.

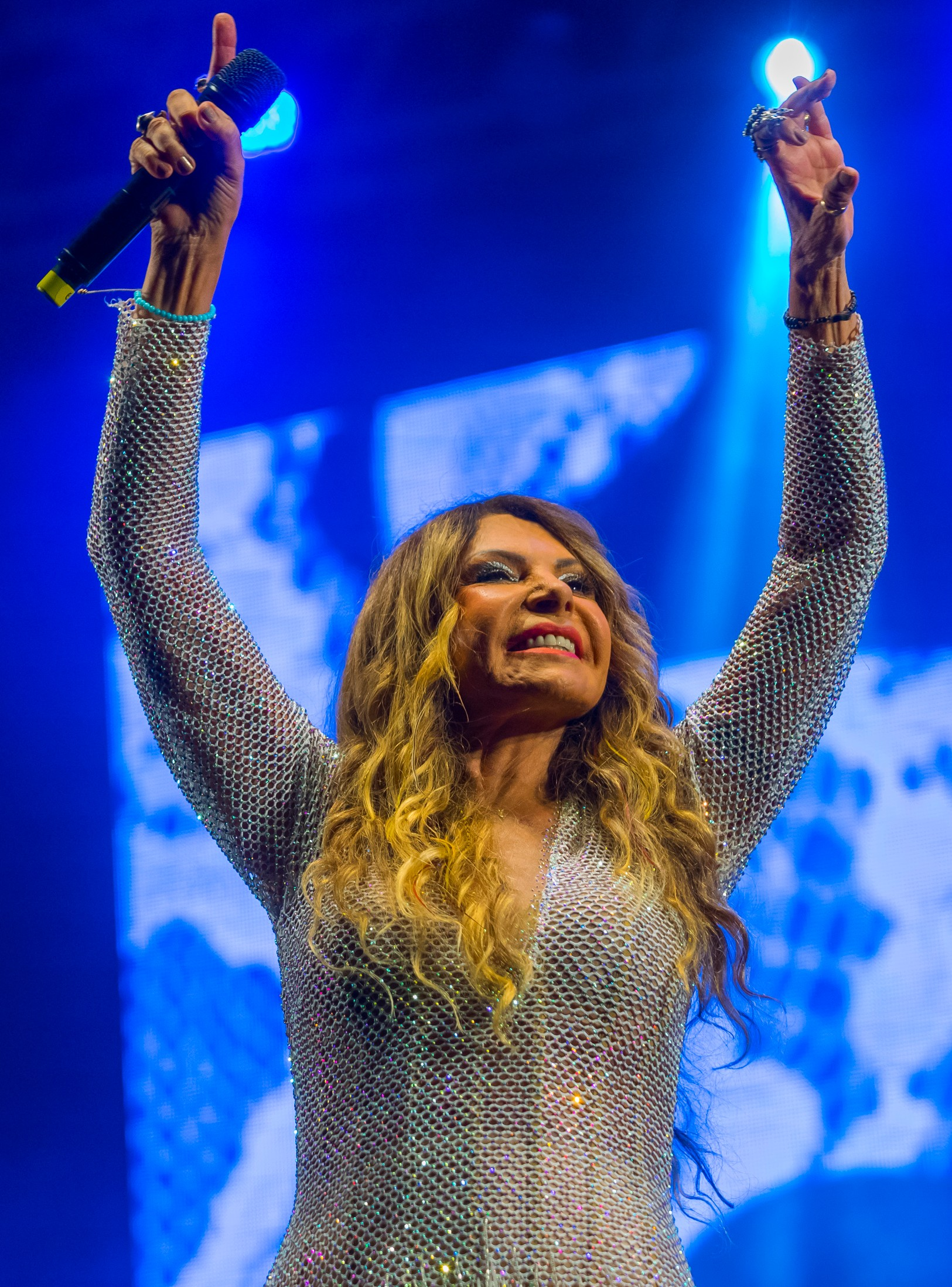
Elba Ramalho was the first winner for Best Native Brazilian Roots Album in 2009.

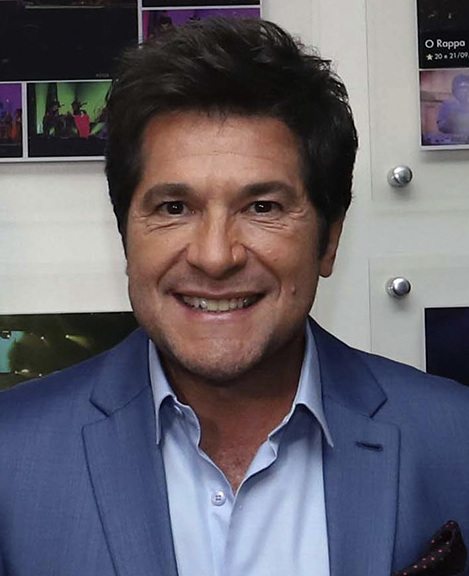
Daniel was the first and only winner for Best Tropical Brazilian Roots Album in 2009.

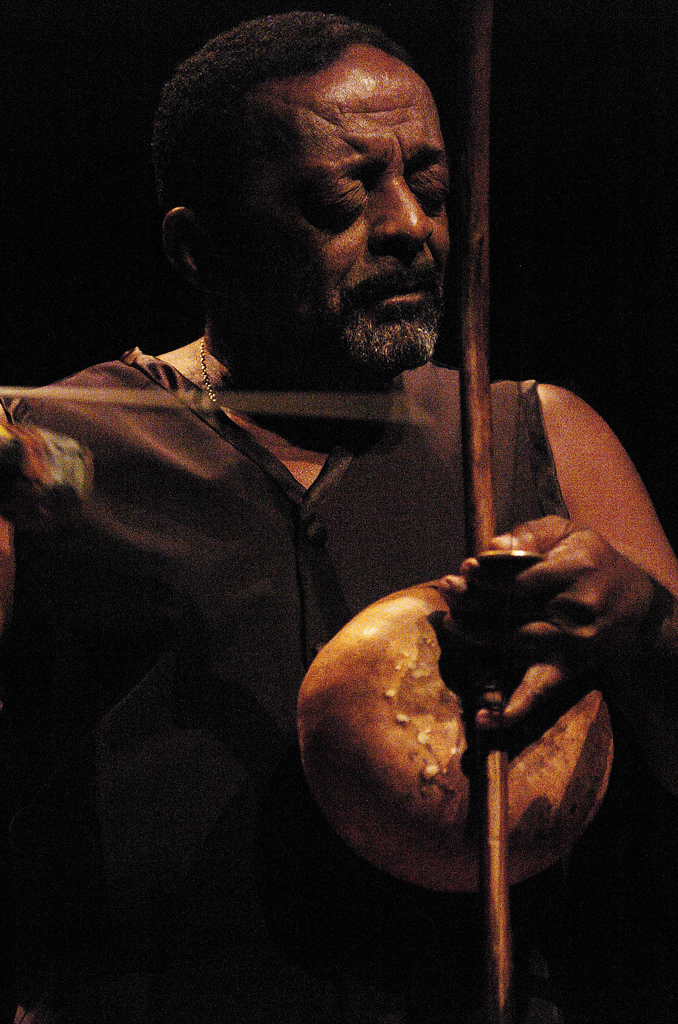
Naná Vasconcelos won the award in 2011.

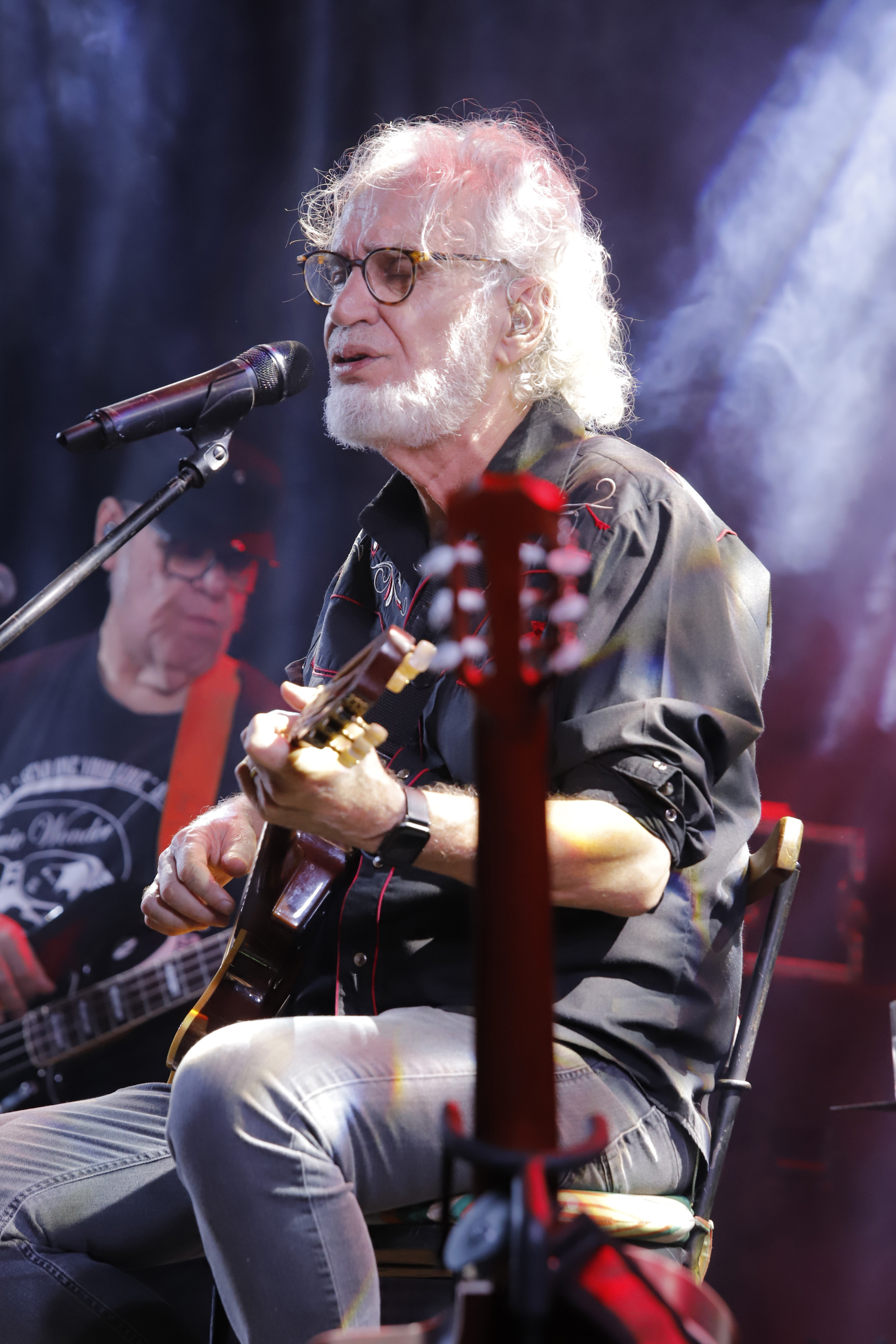
Renato Teixeira has won twice, both alongside Almir Sater, in 2016 and 2018.

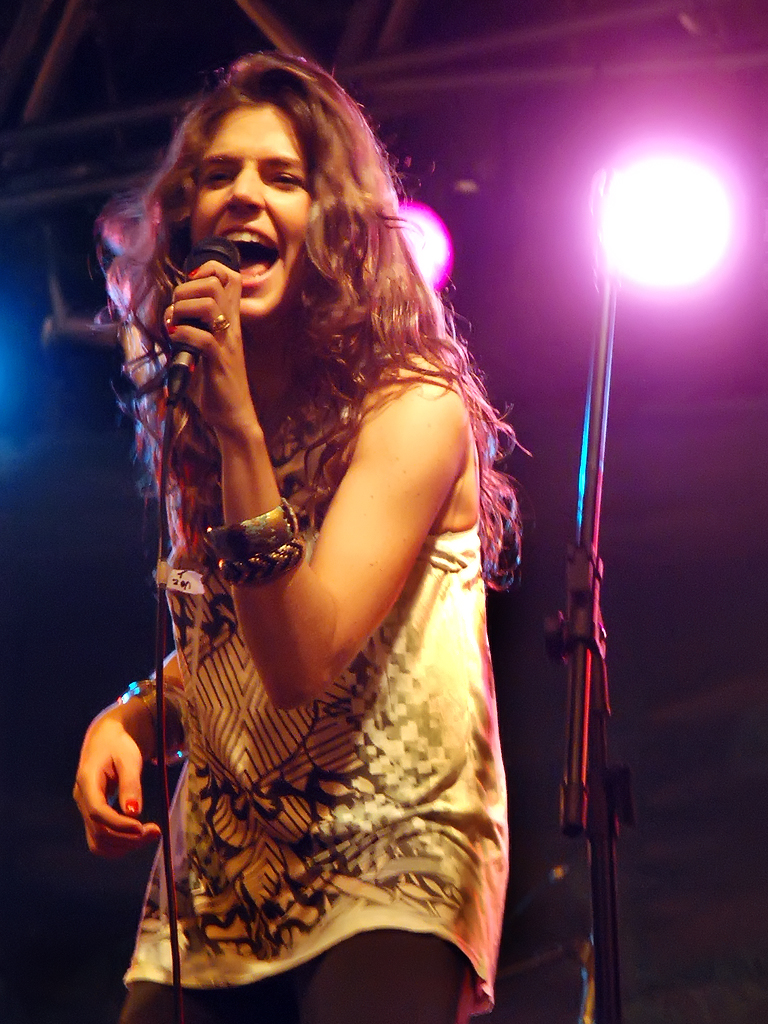
Mariana Aydar won the award in 2020.

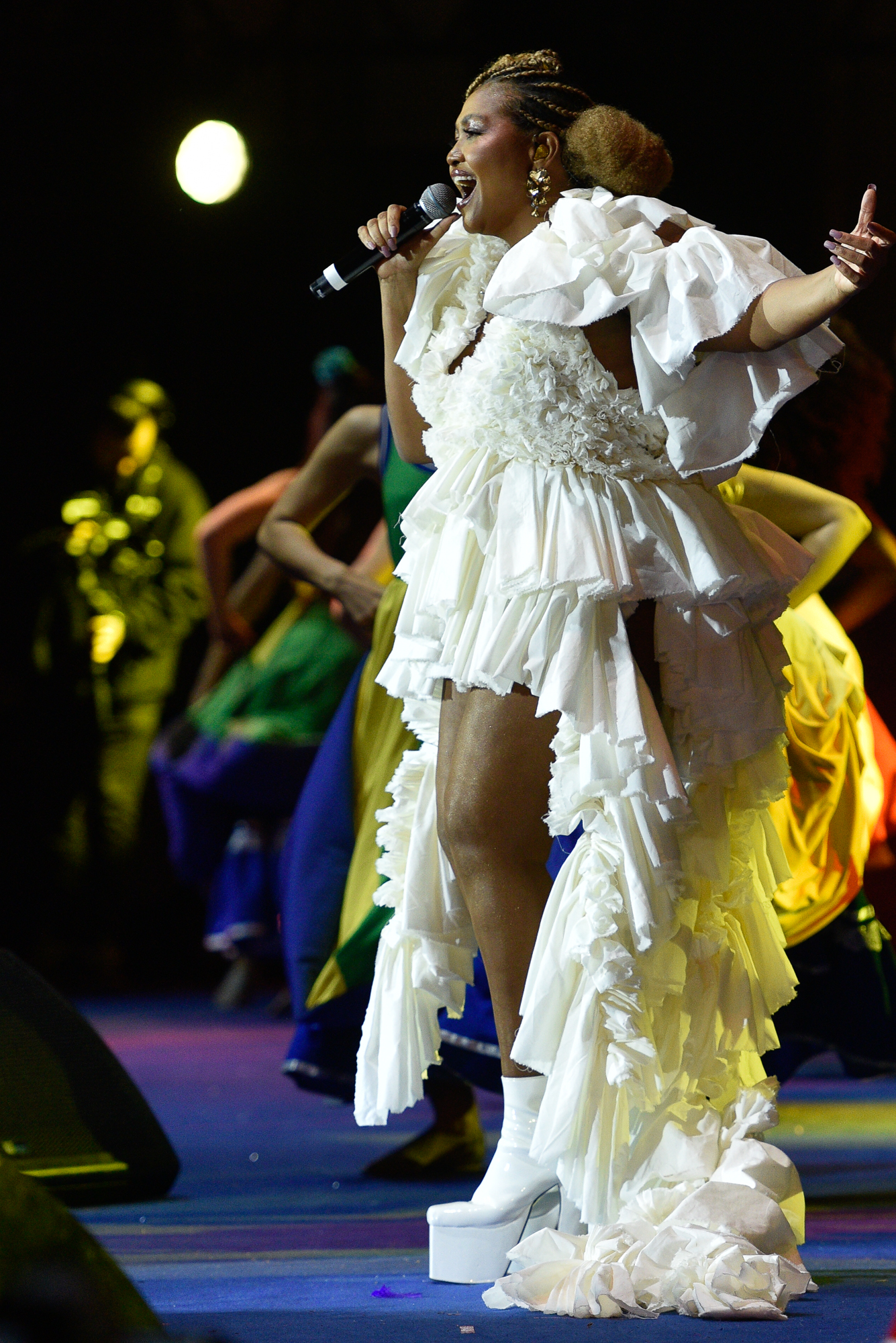
2023 winner, Gaby Amarantos.

Year	Performing artist(s)	Work	Nominees	Ref.
Best Brazilian Roots/Regional Album
2000	Paulo Moura & Os Batutas	Pixinguinha	Nilson Chaves – Tempo Destino: 25 anos ao vivo; Dominguinhos – Voce vai ver o que é bom; Toninho Ferragutti – Sanfonemas; Carlos Malta and Pife Muderno – Carlos Malta e Pife Muderno	
2001	Gilberto Gil	As Canções de Eu Tu Eles	Dominguinhos – Ao Vivo; Forróçacana – Vamo Que Vamo; Zé Ramalho – Nação Nordestina; Alceu Valença – Forró Lunar	
2002	Gilberto Gil	São João Vivo	As Galvão – Nois E A Viola; Caju & Castanha – Andando De Coletivo; Heraldo do Monte – Viola Nordestina; Dominguinhos – Lembrando Voce	
2003	Dominguinhos	Chegando de mansinho	Fafá de Belém – O Canto Das águas; Elomar, Pena Branca, Renato Teixeira, Teca Calazans and Xangai – Cantoria Brasileira; Olodum – Pela Vida; Pena Branca – Pena Branca Canta Xavantinho	
2004	Banda de Pífanos de Caruaru	No Século XXI, No Pátio Do Forró	Ara Ketu – Obrigado A Você; Cascabulho – É Caco de Vidro Puro; Maria Dapaz – Luiz Gonzaga Na Voz de Maria Dapaz-Vida de Viajante; Liu & Léu – Jeitão de Caboclo; Sérgio Reis and Filhos – Violas e Violeiros	
2005	Ivete Sangalo	MTV Ao Vivo	Renato Borghetti – Gaitapontocom; Caju & Castanha – Recado a São Paulo; Dominguinhos, Sivuca and Oswaldinho – Cada Um Belisca Um Pouco; Forróçacana – Os Maiores Sucessos de São João; Gil – O Canto Da Sereia; Elba Ramalho and Dominguinhos – Baião De Dois	
2006	Chitãozinho & Xororó	Vida Marvada	Frank Aguilar – Sou Brasileiro; Banda Calypso – Volume 8; Caju & Castanha – Levante A Taça; Sérgio Reis – Para Toda A Família	
2007	Daniela Mercury	Balé Mulato - Ao Vivo	Dominguinhos – Conterrâneos; Margareth Menezes – Brasileira - Ao Vivo; Sérgio Reis – Tributo A Goiá; Naná Vasconcelos – Trilhas	
Best Contemporary Brazilian Roots Album
2008	Elba Ramalho	Qual o Assunto Que Mais Lhe Interessa?	Harmonia Do Samba – Esse Som Vai Te Levar - Ao Vivo; Trio Curupira – Pés no Brasil, Cabeça no Mundo; Trio Virgulino – 26 Anos de Estrada; Victor & Leo – Ao Vivo em Uberlândia	
Best Traditional Brazilian Roots/Regional Album
2008	Chitãozinho & Xororó	Grandes Clássicos Sertanejos Acústico I	Pedro Bento and Zé Da Estrada – 50 Anos de Mariachis & Grandes Sucessos Sertanejos; Renato Borghetti – Fandango!; Cezar & Paulinho – Companheiro é Companheiro; Siba e a Fuloresta – Toda Vez Que Eu Dou Um Passo O Mundo Sai Dolugar	
Best Native Brazilian Roots Album
2009	Elba Ramalho	Balaio De Amor	Banda Calypso – Amor Sem Fim; Caju & Castanha – Sorria Você Está Sendo Filmado; Netinho – Minha Praia; Orquestra Contemporânea de Olinda – Orquestra Contemporânea de Olinda	
Best Tropical Brazilian Roots Album
2009	Daniel	As Músicas do Filme O Menino da Porteira	Mazinho Quevedo – Alma Caipira; Os Serranos – 40 Anos - Sempre Gaúchos!; Tchê Guri – A Festa; Tradição – Micareta 2 Sertaneja	
Best Native Brazilian Roots Album
2010	Gilberto Gil	Fé na Festa	Frank Aguiar – Danquele Jeito; Banda Calypso – 10 Anos CD 2; Gaúcho da Fronteira – Gaúcho Doble Chapa; Eva – Lugar da Alegria	
2011	Naná Vasconcelos	Sinfonia & Batuques	Geraldo Azevedo – Salve São Francisco; Gilberto Gil – Fé Na Festa Ao Vivo; Paulo César Pinheiro – Capoeira de Besouro; Elba Ramalho – Marco Zero Ao Vivo	
Best Brazilian Roots Album
2012	Dominguinhos	Iluminado	Gaby Amarantos – Treme; Oswaldinho Do Acordeon – Forró Chorado; Jammil – Jammil Na Real; Daniela Mercury – Canibália - Ritmos do Brasil (Ao Vivo)	
2013	Various Artists: Téo Azevedo, producer	Salve Gonzagão 100 Anos	César Oliveira & Rogério Melo – Era Assim Naquele Tempo...!; Os Serranos – Os Serranos Interpretam Sucessos Gaúchos Vol. 3; Elba Ramalho – Vambora Lá Dançar; Various Artists; Jackson Antunes & Téo Azevedo (producer) – Sob O Olhar Januarense / O Velho Chico - Volume 1	
2014	Falamansa	Amigo Velho	Cajú & Castanha – Meu Deus Que País É Esse!; Festa Na Roça – Toninho Ferragutti e Neymar Dias; Minhas Canções Inacabadas – Tavinho Moura; Quinteto Violado – Quinteto Canta Gonzagão; Alceu Valença – Amigo Da Arte	
2015	Not awarde			
2016	Almir Sater e Renato Teixeira	AR	Lucy Alves e Clã Brasil – No Forró do Seu Rosil; Heraldo do Monte – Heraldo do Monte; Elba Ramalho – Cordas, Gonzaga e Afins; Alceu Valença – A Luneta e o Tempo (soundtrack)	
2017	Bruna Viola	Ao Vivo - Melodias Do Sertão	Patrícia Bastos – Batom Bacaba; Pinduca – No Embalo do Pinduca; Trio Nordestino – Canta O Nordeste; Yangos – Chamamé; Various Artists; Serena Assumpção, Dipa & Pipo Pegoraro (album producers) – Ascensão	
Best Portuguese Language Roots Album
2018	Almir Sater and Renato Teixeira	+A3	Anastácia – Dequele Jeito!; Mariza – Mariza; Sara Tavares – Fitxadu; Borghetti Yamandu – Borghetti Yamandu	
2019	Hermeto Pascoal	Hermeto Pascoal E Sua Visão Original Do Forró	Foli Griô Orquestra – Ajo; Alessandra Leão – Macumbas E Catimbós; Elba Ramalho – O Ouro Do Pó Da Estrada; Zé Mulato e Cassiano – Rei Caipira	
2020	Mariana Aydar	Veia Nordestina	Camané & Mário Laginha – Aqui Está-se Sossegado; Mariene de Castro & Almério – Acaso Casa Ao Vivo; Targino Gondim – Targino Sem Limites; Grupo Ofa – Obatalá - Uma Homenagem a Mãe Carmen; Margareth Menezes – Autêntica	
2021	Ivete Sangalo	Arraía Da Veveta	Luiz Caldas – Sambadeiras; Sara Correia – Do Coração; Orquestra Afrosinfônica; André Magalhães & Ubiratan Marques, album producers – Orin a Língua Dos Anjos; Elba Ramalho – Eu e Vocês	
2022	Alceu Valença	Senhora Estrada	Mateus Aleluia – Afrocanto as Nações; Banda Pau e Corda Featuring Quinteto Violado – Na Estrada . Ao Vivo; Luiz Caldas – Remelexo Bom; Targino Gondim, Nilton Freittas, Roberto Malvezzi – Belo Chico; Áurea Martins – Senhora das Folhas; Iara Rennó – Oríki	
2023	Gaby Amarantos	TecnoShow	Carminho – Portuguesa; João Gomes – Raiz; Elba Ramalho – Elba Ramalho No Maior São João Do Mundo; Almir Sater – Do Amanha Nada Sei; Gabriel Sater – Erva Doce	
2024	Mariana Aydar & Mestrinho	Mariana e Mestrinho	Aguidavi Do Jêje & Luizinho Do Jêje – Aguidavi do Jêje; João Gomes – De Norte a Sul; Marcelo Jeneci – Night Clube Forró Latino (Volume I); Gabriel Sater – Faróis do Sertão	
2025	João Gomes, Mestrinho & Jota.pê	Dominguinho	Joyce Alane – Casa Coração; Camané – Ao Vivo No Ccb: Homenagem A José Mário Branco; Natascha Falcão – Universo De Paixão; Fitti – Transespacial	
