= Pena Branca & Xavantinho =

Brazilian sertanejo duo

- Born: José Ramiro Sobrinho (Pena Branca); Ranulfo Ramiro da Silva (Xavantinho); September 4, 1939 (Pena Branca); Igarapava, São Paulo, Brazil; December 26, 1942 (Xavantinho); Uberlândia, Minas Gerais, Brazil
- Origin: Uberlândia, Minas Gerais, Brazil
- Died: February 8, 2010 (aged 70) São Paulo, Brazil (Pena Branca); October 8, 1999 (aged 56) São Paulo, Brazil (Xavantinho)
- Genres: Sertanejo
- Years active: 1962–1999

Pena Branca & Xavantinho was a Brazilian Sertanejo duo made up of brothers José Ramiro Sobrinho (4 September 1939 – 8 February 2010), as Pena Branca, and Ranulfo Ramiro da Silva (26 December 1942 – 8 October 1999), as Xavantinho. They became famous with their cover of the Milton Nascimento song "O cio da terra", with Nascimento himself providing guest vocals. During their career, they recorded with famous artists both inside and outside the Sertanejo scene such as Nascimento, Rolando Boldrin, Fagner, and Almir Sater, among others.

== Biography ==
=== Pena Branca ===
José Ramiro Sobrinho, or Pena Branca, was born on 4 September 1939 in Igarapava, São Paulo. He lived for a large part of his life in the city of Uberlândia, Minas Gerais, later the birth city of his brother Xavantinho.

=== Xavantinho ===
Ranulfo Ramiro da Silva, or Xavantinho, was born in the Cruzeiro dos Peixotos district of Uberlândia on 26 December 1942.

=== Early life ===
The brothers largely grew up in a rural zone of Uberlândia. They worked in a rural area when they were children alongside their parents and five siblings. José Ramiro learned to play the viola de cravelha (a 12-string guitar), while Ranulfo learned to play the violão. They performed at folias de reis, at kermesse, parties, and volunteer drives. Their father died when Pena Branca and Xavantinho were 12 and 9 years old, respectively.

=== 1958–68: Beginning of musical career ===
In 1958, Pena Branca & Xavantinho began to sing as a duo, performing on a radio station in Uberlândia. In 1961, they appeared on Coronel Hipopota's program on Rádio Educadora de Uberlândia. At that time they called themselves Peroba and Jatobá. Afterwards, they adopted the stage name Barcelo e Barcelinho and, later on, Xavante e Xavantinho, inspired by their history classes in primary school. In 1964, they travelled to the interior of the state of Goiás with accordionist Pinaji. The three became, for a brief period, Trio Pena Branca. In 1968, they moved to São Paulo to attempt to grow their musical careers.

=== 1970s: Name change to Pena Branca & Xavantinho ===
They came in 4th place at a festival promoted by Rádio Cometa, which offered them a chance to record a CD with their song “Saudade” (Xavantinho, 1971). To acknowledge the two as a duo, they again changed their name to Pena Branca e Xavantinho. In 1975, they became part of the Coração de Viola orchestra in Guarulhos, where Inezita Barroso heard them sing and encouraged them to continue in their musical trajectory. That same year, they were hired to perform at the Basilica of Our Lady of Aparecida on weekends.

=== 1980s: Album releases and prizes ===
In 1980, they participated in "Festival MPB Shell" on TV Globo, with the pagode caipira "Que terreiro é esse?", written by Xavantinho. The song reached the final round. That same year, they released their first LP: "Velha morada" (Warner), with the most famous songs being "Cio da terra" (Milton Nascimento, Chico Buarque), "Calix Bento", along with the titular "Velha morada".

The duo participated on Som Brasil in 1981, which was presented by Rolando Boldrin on TV Globo, with whom they later performed in shows throughout Brazil.

In 1982, they released the LP "Uma dupla brasileira", produced by Boldrin, the most well-known of which being "Memória de carreiro" (Juraíldes da Cruz) and "Rama da mandioquinha" (Elpídio dos Santos).

In 1987, they released "O cio da terra" (Continental), with special participation by Milton Nascimento, Marcus Viana, and Tavinho Moura, becoming known for "Vaca Estrela e boi Fubá" (Patativa do Assaré) and "Cuitelinho" (a folkcloric song collected by Paulo Vanzolini). The LP was their best-selling album to date, with more than 300,000 copies sold, and led them to become more known nationally, reaching an audience with fans of MPB.

In 1988, they launched the LP "Canto violeiro" (Continental), with special participations from Fagner, Tião Carreiro, and Almir Sater, among others, containing the hit "Mulheres da terra" (Xavantinho and Moniz).

=== 1990s: Final years and Xavantinho's death ===
They won the Sharp Award in Best Music in 1990 with the song "Casa de barro", written by Xavantinho and Moniz, and Best CD, with "Cantado do mundo afora".

In 1992, "Ao Vivo em Tatuí", recorded live between 21 and 23 September 1992 at the Teatro do Conservatório de Tatuí with Renato Teixeira (Kuarup) again won the Sharp Award for Best CD and the APCA Prize.

They would later record "Violas e canções"(Velas) in 1993, having a major hit with "Viola quebrada" (Mário de Andrade). They would also perform internationally for the first time that year, playing shows in the United States.

They also released "Ribeirão encheu" (Velas), in 1995, along with "Luar do sertão" (João Pernambuco and Catulo da Paixão Cearense) and "Pingo d'água" (Velas). In 1996, they released "Tristeza do jeca" (Angelino de Oliveira) and "Flor do cafezal" (Luís Carlos Paraná).

Their last project, Coração Matuto (1998), would bring singles such as “Planeta Água” (Guilherme Arantes), “Lambada de Serpente” (Djavan), “Morro Velho” (Milton Nascimento), and “Carreiro Velho” e “Estrada”, the last compositions by Xavantinho.

The duo ended with the death of Xavantinho on 8 October 1999 at 56 years old due to a pulmonary embolism.

Pena Branca continued performing in a solo career. His 2002 album, Pena Branca canta Xavantinho, along with his participation on the Elomar album Cantoria brasileira, were both nominated for Best Brazilian Roots/Regional album at the 4th Annual Latin Grammy Awards, held in Miami, Florida, USA in 2003. He would continue to perform until his own death on 8 February 2010, at age 70, due to a heart attack.

== Legacy ==
In 2007, a researcher from the Federal University of Uberlândia, Ariovaldo Giaretta, named a species of frog after Pena Branca & Xavantinho. The frog species, Ischnocnema penaxavantinho, is part of the brachycephalidae family of frogs and is native to the region around the duo's hometown of Uberlândia.

== Discography ==
- Velha morada (1980)
- Uma dupla brasileira (1982)
- Cio da terra (1987)
- Canto violeiro (1988)
- Cantadô do mundo afora (1990)
- Ao vivo em Tatuí (with Renato Teixeira) (1992)
- Violas e canções (1993)
- Pena Branca & Xavantinho (1994)
- Ribeirão encheu (1995)
- Coração matuto (1998)
