= Elomar Figueira Mello =

Elomar
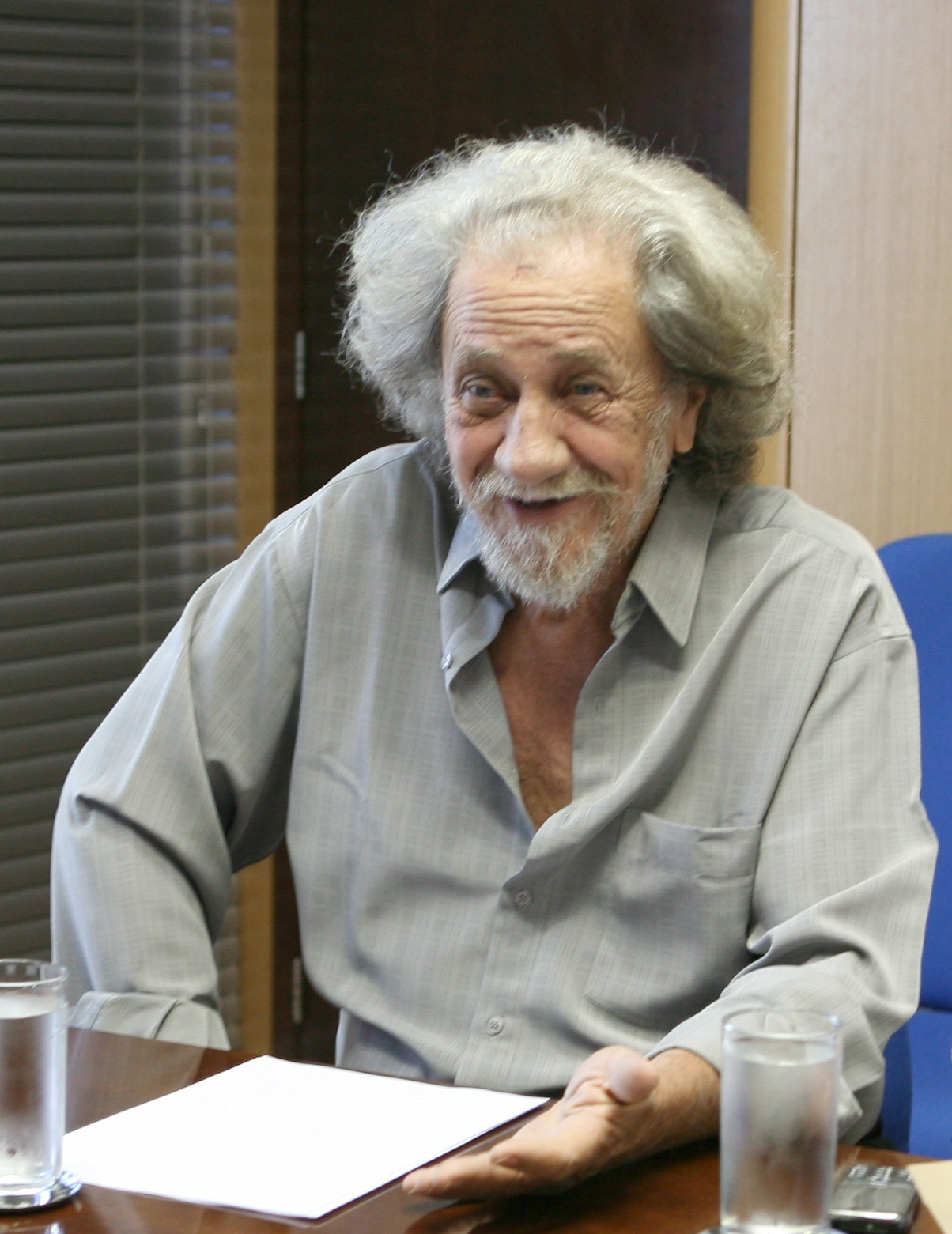

Background information
- Born: December 21, 1937 (age 88); Vitória da Conquista
- Genres: Folk music; Sertanejo music; Chivalric romance
- Occupations: Poet, songwriter, singer, guitar player
- Instruments: Spanish guitar, matraca
- Years active: 1972–present
- Website: https://www.elomar.com.br/

Elomar Figueira Mello (born December 21, 1937) is a Brazilian singer, songwriter, guitarist, and poet. His compositions have been interpreted by the likes of Marlui Miranda, Elba Ramalho, Xangai, Teca Calazans, and Raimundo Fagner. His body of work, which blends classical, medieval and popular influences, has been praised by Caetano Veloso, Vinicius de Moraes, and José Ramos Tinhorão.

His style is characterized by the use of archaisms and neologisms, and by the presence of oral and dialectal elements typical of the northeastern popular cancioneiro.

== Discography ==
- Das Barrancas do Rio Gavião (1972)
- Na Quadrada das Águas Perdidas (1978)
- Parcelada Malunga (1980)
- Fantasia Leiga para um Rio Seco (1981)
- ConSertão (1982)
- Cartas Catingueiras (1983)
- Auto da Catingheira (1983)
- Cantoria (1984)
- Cantoria 2 (1984)
- Sertania (1985)
- Elomar dos Confins do Sertão (1986)
- Concerto Sertanez (1988)
- Elomar em Concerto (1989)
- Árias Sertânicas (1992)
- Cantoria 3 – Canto e Solo (1995)

== Literary works ==
- Sertanílias. Vitória da Conquista: 2008. ISBN 978-85-908262-0-0.
- A Era dos grandes equívocos. Vitória da Conquista: 2016. ISBN 978-85-908262-1-7.
