= Luiz Caldas =

Brazilian musician

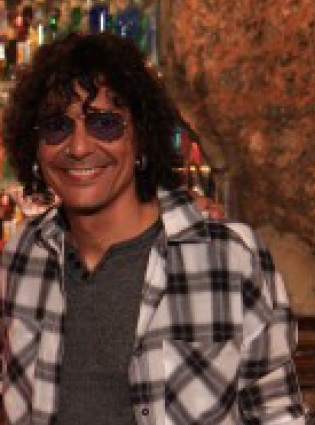
- Caldas in 2015

Background information
- Born: Luiz César Pereira Caldas; 19 January 1963 (age 63); Feira de Santana, Bahia, Brazil
- Genres: Axé; Samba reggae; MPB; Lambada
- Occupations: Singer; songwriter; multi-instrumentalist; music producer
- Instruments: Vocals; Bahian guitar; acoustic guitar; electric guitar; bass; bass; percussion; cavaquinho; mandolin; piano; accordion
- Years active: 1979–present
- Website: www.luizcaldas.com.br

Luiz César Pereira Caldas (January 19, 1963) is a Brazilian singer, songwriter, multi-instrumentalist and music producer. He gained prominence in 1985 with the song Fricote, which contributed to the popularization of axé music, and has been a notable figure in the Salvador Carnival.

== Biography ==
=== Early years ===
Caldas was born in the city of Feira de Santana and moved to Vitória da Conquista during his childhood. He is the son of a federal highway patrolman and a housewife. As a teenager, he joined several bands that performed in the interior of Bahia, and learned to play various instruments.

Upon gaining some recognition, he was invited to play in Orlando Campos' Trio Elétrico Tapajós, with whom he recorded the song "Oxumalá," released in 1979 on Tapajós' album Ave Caetano. After recording the album, he became a freelance studio musician in Salvador, capital of Bahia.

=== Career ===
In 1985, he recorded the album Magia, which included the track Fricote. It gained widespread attention, spreading from Salvador to major music consumption centers such as Rio de Janeiro and São Paulo, diverging from the typical dissemination patterns of the time.

Active in Salvador's carnival, he achieved national recognition in the 1980s and was a regular guest on the main television programs of the 1980s, such as the hit show Cassino do Chacrinha, hosted by José Abelardo Barbosa, which at the time was a showcase for artists. With his success, he became the cover of Veja magazine, the country's leading magazine. In addition to Fricote, he achieved success with songs such as Tieta, which was the theme song for the soap opera Tieta by Aguinaldo Silva, inspired by the book of the same name of Jorge Amado. In 2023, his song Haja Amor gained renewed popularity on the social network TikTok, nearly forty years after its release.

In the 2010s, he began a new phase in his career. He started independently releasing his albums on his official website and expanded his musical repertoire to include styles such as heavy metal, forró, and arrocha. More than twenty-five albums have already been released in this independent and free download format.

In 2021, he was nominated for a Latin Grammy in the category of Latin Grammy Award for Best Portuguese Language Roots Album for the album Sambadeiras. In 2022, he received another nomination in the same category for his forró album Remelexo Bom.

== Discography ==
Year	Album
1979	Ave Caetano/Tapajós
1980	Luiz Caldas e Acordes Verdes
1981	Jubileu de Prata: Trio Elétrico Tapajós
1985	Magia
1986	Flor Cigana
1987	Lá Vem o Guarda
1988	Muito Obrigado
1989	Timbres
1990	Nós
1992	Retrato
1994	Luiz Caldas
1998	Forró de Cabo a Rabo
1999	15 Anos de Axé – Luiz Caldas e Convidados
2001	Janela Aberta
2003	Luz e Fogueira
2004	Melosofia
2006	Ao Vivo em Salvador
2010	MPB – Uma Maria
2010	MPB II – Perguntas e Respostas
2010	Rock – Castelo de Gelo
2010	Samba – Pandeiro Brasileiro
2010	Brega – Brasil Superpopular
2010	Tupi – Nheengara Recé Taba
2010	Instrumental – Oxóssi
2010	Frevo – O Trio Elétrico
2010	Forró – Festa de Sanfoneiros
2010	Axé – Gongá
2013	Axé – Apopod'lé
2013	Guitarra Baiana – Viva a Guitarra Baiana
2013	Chorinho – As Donas da Rua Santos Dumont
2013	Música Rural – Mundão de Deus
2015	O Filtro de Sonhos
2018	Samba na Palma da Mão
2018	La Llave
2018	Fire and Music
2018	Curumim Tucuju
2019	Te Amo
2019	Somos Nós
2019	Respeito é bom e eu gosto
2019	O Pirata e o Baú
2019	O Olho
2019	O Fogo do Forró
2019	Deuses Hindus
2019	De Mansinho
2019	Carapanã
2019	Beatcotô
2019	Banho de perfume
2020	Um Outro Tempo
2020	Sarau no Pátio das Flores
2020	São João em Casa
2020	Puro Prazer
2020	Pó de Estrelas
2020	Paleta de Cores
2020	Otimista
2020	Ori
2020	Mínima – Instrumental
2020	Guitarra Brasileira
2020	Eu Também Quero Ir
2020	A Linha
2021	Sambadeiras
2021	Hip Hop Pedrada
2021	Remelexo Bom

== Personal life ==
Caldas has been married to Sandra Nascimento since 1978. The couple has three children: André, Aiac, and Akauan. André is the father of Luiz's two grandchildren, Maria Alice and Luiz Vicente.

The family lives in Salvador, Bahia, where Caldas maintains a professional studio at home for composing and recording.

Caldas has followed a vegetarian diet for over 20 years and practices yoga and Pilates. He avoids alcohol and smoking. He has struggled with alcoholism but has managed to remain sober.
