= Sambadeiras =

Studio album by Luiz Caldas
- Released: April 1, 2021
- Recorded: 2020–2021
- Genre: Samba de roda
- Length: 44:00
- Label: Independent
- Producer: Luiz Caldas

Sambadeiras is a samba de roda album by Brazilian musician Luiz Caldas, released independently on April 1, 2021. The album was nominated for a Latin Grammy Award for Best Portuguese Language Roots Album in 2021.

== Background ==
Luiz Caldas stated in several interviews that the album was a tribute to the musicians and musical tradition of the Recôncavo Baiano region of Bahia. For Caldas, the main artist that the work sought to honor was Roberto Mendes, a traditional Bahian musician, in addition to the also renowned Jorge Portugal.

The album cover was designed by Akauan Caldas based on a photo by John Levis, which depicts samba dancers. The album was released independently and made available for free listening via download or music streaming services.

== Tracks ==
No.	Title	Writer(s)	Length
1.	"É Desse Jeito"	Luiz Caldas	4:24
2.	"As Voltas do Mundo"	Luiz Caldas	4:12
3.	"Meu Nome É Recôncavo"	Luiz Caldas	4:36
4.	"Graciosa"	Luiz Caldas	4:18
5.	"Benzedeira"	Luiz Caldas	4:30
6.	"Deixa a Gira Girar"	Luiz Caldas	4:22
7.	"Dim Dim"	Luiz Caldas	4:15
8.	"Vavá e Nicinha"	Luiz Caldas	4:28
9.	"Ibejada"	Luiz Caldas	4:20
10.	"Nunca Fale o Que Sabe"	Luiz Caldas	4:35
Total length:			44:00

== Reception ==
=== Awards ===
The album was nominated for a Latin Grammy Awards in 2021 in the category of Best Portuguese Language Roots Album. At a ceremony held at the MGM Grand Garden Arena in Las Vegas, United States, the album was surpassed by Ivete Sangalo's Arraiá da Veveta.

Year	Award	Venue	Category	Result	Ref.
2021	Latin Grammy Awards	MGM Grand Las Vegas, Las Vegas, Nevada, United States	Best Portuguese Language Roots Album	Won	

== Personnel ==
The following musicians worked on this album:

- Luiz Caldas – direction, production, arrangements, recording, editing, bass, guitars, cavaquinho, mandolin, and vocals;
- Andrea Caldas – vocals;
- Paulinho Caldas – vocals;
- Durval Caldas – vocals;
- Fernando Nunes – bass;
- Luciano PP – bass;
- Júlio Caldas – viola machete;
- Claudinho Guimarães – percussion;
- Kall Rabelo – percussion;
- Daniel Novaes – percussion.
