= As Canções de Eu Tu Eles =

Soundtrack album by Gilberto Gil
- Released: June 15, 2000
- Genre: MPB, Latin pop
- Label: Warner
- Producer: Gilberto Gil, Tom Capone

Gilberto Gil chronology
Vira Mundo (2001)	As Canções de Eu Tu Eles (2000)	São João Vivo (2001)

As Canções de Eu Tu Eles (transl. The Songs of Me You Them) is an album released by Brazilian singer-songwriter Gilberto Gil in 2001. The album is the soundtrack for the 2000 film Eu Tu Eles directed by Andrucha Waddington, starred by Regina Casé, Lima Duarte, Stênio Garcia and Luiz Carlos Vasconcelos. Set in Russas, the film is about a countywoman who lives together with her three husbands and two children in the arid backlands of the northeast of Brazil. At the 2000 Cannes Film Festival it earned a "Special Distinction" in the Un Certain Regard section.

Waddington asked Gil to record the album, which also became Gil's tribute to Luiz Gonzaga "The King of the Baião", recording songs previously released by Gonzaga, such as "Assum Preto," "Asa Branca," "Juazeiro," and "Qui Nem Jiló". Gil also wrote songs especially for this movie soundtrack, "As Pegadas do Amor" and "Lamento Sertanejo". The first single released, "Esperando Na Janela", became a hit in Brazil in 2000. There is also a song recorded by Gil on his album Dia Dorim, Noite Neon (1995), "Casinha Feliz", that is recreated and closes the album, which was recorded in ten days.

The album was named by Phillip Jandovský of Allmusic one of Gil's best since the 1970s and a "very authentic and down-to-earth tribute to the old masters of the popular music of the Brazilian Northeast region." Alvaro Neder, also of Allmusic, referred to the music on the album as "delicious", with the songs "filled with the genuine soul of the suffering northeast." As Canções de Eu Tu Eles received a Latin Grammy Award nomination for Album of the Year^{[I]} and was awarded for Best Brazilian Roots/Regional Album. The song "Esperando Na Janela" earned the Latin Grammy for Best Brazilian Song and was nominated for Record of the Year.

== Track listing ==
This information adapted from Allmusic.

No.	Title	Writer(s)	Length
1.	"Oia Eu Aqui de Novo"	Antônio Barros	3:39
2.	"Baião de Penha"	Guio DeMorais, David Nasser	4:07
3.	"Esperando Na Janela"	Raimundinho DoAcordion, Targino Godim, Manuca	4:20
4.	"Juazeiro"	Luiz Gonzaga, Humberto Teixeira	3:42
5.	"Ultimo Pau-De-Arara"	Corumbá, José Gumarães, Venancio	3:20
6.	"Asa Branca"	Gonzaga, Teixeira	3:36
7.	"Qui Nem Jiló"	Gonzaga, Teixeira	3:24
8.	"Assum Preto"	Gonzaga, Teixeira	3:19
9.	"Pau-De-Arara"	Gonzaga, DeMorais	3:11
10.	"A Volta Da Asa Branca"	Gonzaga, Zé Dantas	4:30
11.	"O Amor Daqui de Casa"	Gilberto Gil	2:28
12.	"As Pegadas Do Amor"	Gil	3:29
13.	"Lamento Sertanejo"	Dominguinhos, Gil	4:20
14.	"Casinha Feliz"	Gil	0:32

^{^[I]} The nomination was shared with Vitor Farias, Marcelo Machado and Nas Nuvens (engineers/mixers).

== Certification ==
Region	Certification	Certified units/sales
Brazil (Pro-Música Brasil)	Platinum	250,000^{*}
^{*} Sales figures based on certification alone.
