= Patrícia Bastos =

Brazilian singer-songwriter

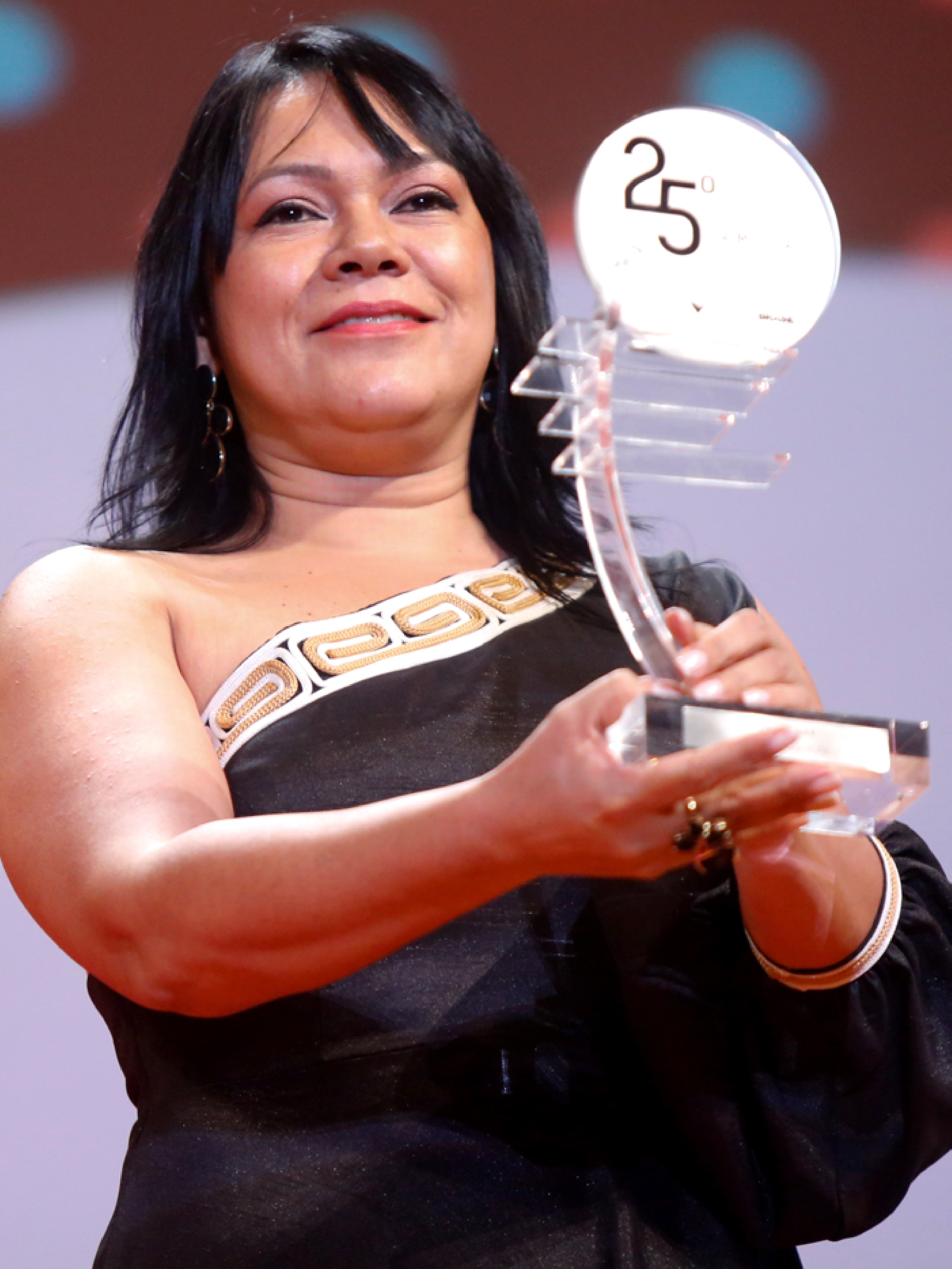
- Bastos at the 25th Premio da Musica Brasileira (2014).
- Born: Patrícia Christiane Guedes Bastos; April 18, 1970 (age 56); Macapá, Brazil
- Occupations: singer; songwriter
- Years active: 1997–present
- Musical career
- Genres: MPB, marabaixo, jazz, zouk
- Instruments: vocal; guitar
- Label: Independent

Patrícia Christiane Guedes Bastos (Brazilian Portuguese: [paˈtɾisiɐ ˈbastus], locally [-ˈbaʃtuʃ]; born 18 April 1970) is a Brazilian singer-songwriter.

== Biography ==
Born in Macapá, the daughter of singer Oneide Bastos, she began her professional music career at 18, when she was chosen as the lead vocalist of the group Banda Brinds, with whom she remained for five years. Starting from the 1990s, she embarked on a solo career, first performing locally, and later gaining national recognition through participation in several festivals.

With the album Zulusa, released in 2013, Bastos won the awards for Best Folk Album and Best Folk Performer in the 25th edition of the Brazilian Music Awards. With her following album, Batom Bacaba, she again received nominations in the Best Album and Best Singer categories at the Brazilian Music Awards, and was also nominated for a Latin Grammy for Best Portuguese Language Roots Album.

Her style is characterized from references to the musical tradition of her homeland, the Amapá region, and in particular to its African and indigenous ancestries.

== Discography ==
=== Studio albums ===
- Pólvora e Fogo (2002)
- Sobre Tudo (2007)
- Eu Sou Caboca (2009)
- Zulusa (2013)
- Batom Bacaba (2016)
- Timbres e Temperos (2021) (with Enrico di Micelli and Joãozinho Gomes)
- Voz da Taba (2023)

Live albums

- Patrícia Bastos In Concert (2004)

=== Guest appearances ===
List of other album appearances
Title	Year	Other artist(s)	Album	Ref.
"Beije!"	2015	Thiago K	Em Meio a Tantas Possibilidades de Morte, Me Peguei Pensando na Vida	
"Lua de Fel"	2015	Vital Lima	O Que Não Tem Fim	
"Água Doce"	2016	Silvan Galvão	Tambores que Cantam	
"Eu Vim do Mar"	2018	Mariana Furquim	Princesa de Aiocá	
"Quer mas não quer"	2019	Paulo Bastos AP	Batuqueiros	
"Mel de Melaço"	2019	Manoel Cordeiro; Zé Renato	Guitar Hero Brasil	
"Arandu Ara"	2019	Corciolli	Imaginary Brazil	
"Ori Dje Dje"	2020	Sapopemba; Benjamim Taubkin	Gbọ́	
"Flor da Manhã"	2020	Fabrício dos Anjos	Novos & Usados – Vol. 1	
"Deserts of Myself"	2020	Corciolli; Emmanuele Baldini	Futura	
"Vozes da Madrugada"	2021	Celso Viáfora	A Vida É	
"Imaginário"	2021	Amazônia Samba	Amazônia Samba	
