= Xangai =

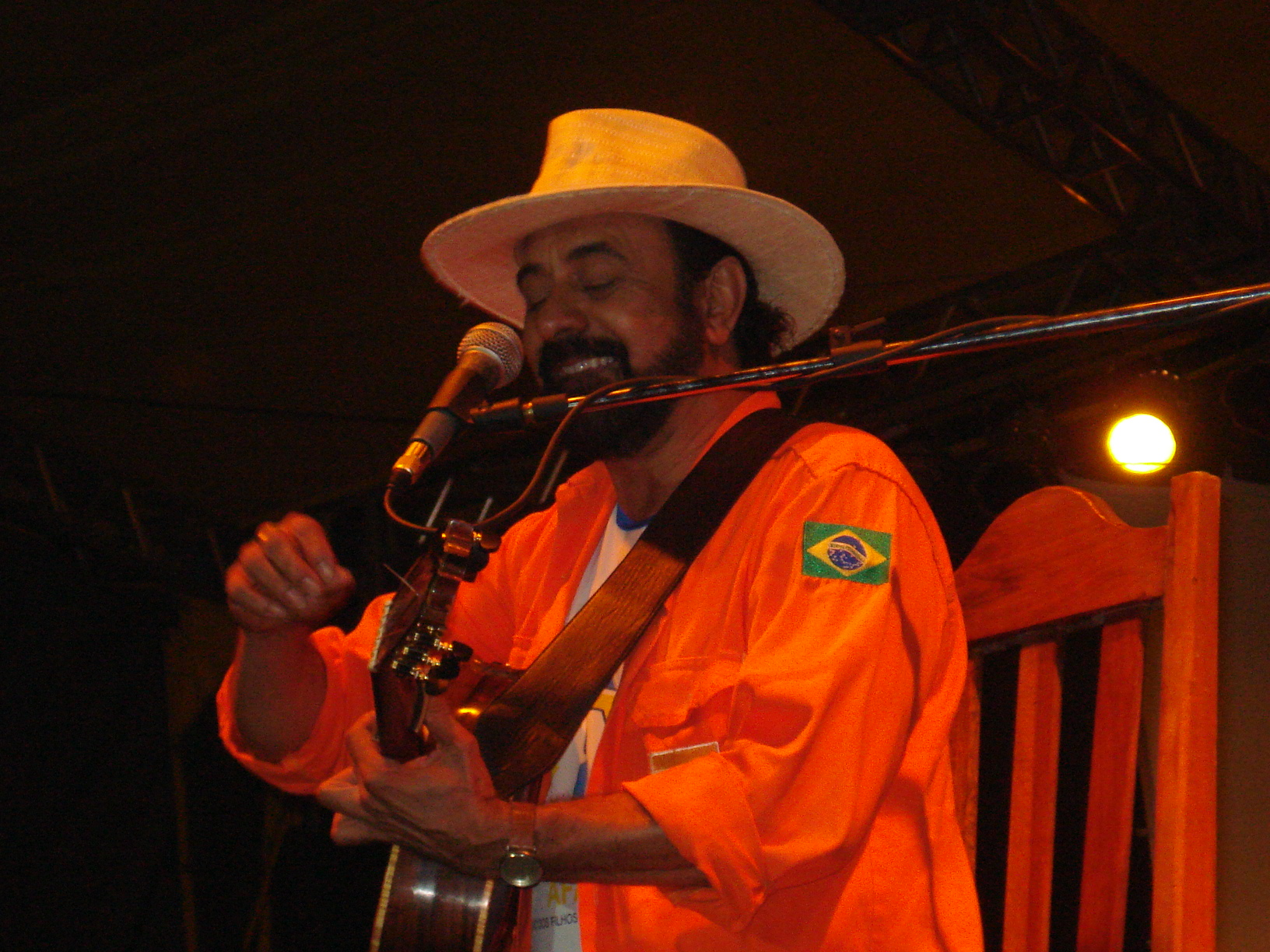
- Born: Eugênio Avelino Lopes Souza; 20 March 1948 (age 77); Itapebi, Bahia, Brazil
- Occupations: Singer, composer, guitarist

Eugênio Avelino Lopes Souza, better known as Xangai (born 20 March 1948) is a Brazilian singer, composer, and guitarist.

== Biography ==
Xangai was born on 20 March 1948 on the banks of the Córrego do Jundiá, a tributary of the Jequitinhonha River, in a rural part of the town of Itapebi, in the far south of Bahia. He was the son and grandson of accordionists. At 18, he went with his parents to the city of Nanuque, in the north of Minas Gerais. Xangai is a direct descendent of the sertanista João Gonçalves da Costa, the founder of Arraial da Conquista, which is now the city of Vitória da Conquista.

He lived in Vitória da Conquista, where at 9 years old he met Elomar, who, despite being 10 years older, he became his friend and who had a major musical influence.

His father was the proprietor of an ice cream shop called Xangai in Nanuque, from which he took his name from. In 1976, he recorded his first album, Acontecivento, with tracks such as "Asa Branca", "Forró de Surubim", and "Esta Mata Serenou". He presented the program "Brasilerança" on Rádio Educadora da Bahia, through which he contributed to the spread of cultural music from the Northeast of Brazil.

On 27 July 2021, he was named by the mayor of Vitória da Conquista, Sheila Lemos, to become the Municipal Secrety of Culture, Tourism, Sports, and Leisure in the city. In his inauguration speech, Xangai promised to "harmonize the sector, avoid politics, and value the cultural manifestations of Vitória da Conquista, taking it to as far as it can go: the planet."

== Novelas ==
Xangai made his TV debut on the telenovela Velho Chico as the musician Avelino at the invite of Luiz Fernando Carvalho.

== Discography ==
Studio Albums

- Acontecivento (1976) Epic/CBS LP
- Qué Que Tu Tem Canário (1981) Kuarup LP
- Mutirão da Vida (1984, relançado em 1998) KLP LP
- Xangai canta Cantigas, Incelenças, Puluxias e Tiranas de Elomar (1986) Kuarup LP
- Lua Cheia-Lua Nova (1990) Kuarup LP
- Dos Labutos (1991) Kuarup LP
- Cantoria de Festa (1997) Kuarup CD
- Um Abraço Pra Ti, Pequenina (1998) CD
- Brasilerança (2002) Kuarup Discos CD
- Xangai (2015)

Live albums

- Estampas Eucalol (2006) Kuarup CD.

Participations and partnerships

- Parceria Malunga (1980, by Elomar and Arthur Moreira Lima) Discos Marcus Pereira LP
- Cantoria 1 (1984, with Elomar, Geraldo Azevedo, and Vital Farias) MKCD LP, CD
- Cantoria 2 (1988, with Elomar, Geraldo Azevedo e Vital Farias) LP, CD
- Aguaraterra (1996, with Renato Teixeira) Kuarup CD
- Nóis é Jeca Mais é Jóia - (2004, with Juraíldes da Cruz) Kuarup CD
- Morena Sol (2003, Intérprete) Um Caminho pro Sol CD

== Filmography ==
- 2016: Velho Chico - Avelino.
