= Batom Bacaba =

Studio album by Patrícia Bastos
- Released: 7 October 2016
- Genre: MPB; marabaixo; batuque
- Length: 53:59
- Language: Portuguese
- Label: Tratore
- Producer: Dante Ozzetti; Du Moreira

Patrícia Bastos chronology
Zulusa (2013)	Batom Bacaba (2016)	Timbres e Temperos (2021)

Singles from Batom Bacaba
- 1. "Brisa e Brasa"; 2. "Mambo D'Água"; 3. "Mei Mei"; 4. "Mameluca"; 5. "O Desenho da Cidade"

Batom Bacaba (Portuguese: [baˈtõ baˈkabɐ]; Bacaba Lipstick) is the sixth album by Brazilian singer Patrícia Bastos, released on October 7, 2016, under the label Independente. The album was nominated for the 28th edition of the Brazilian Music Awards in the category of Best Album, as well as the 18th edition of the Latin Grammy in the category Best Portuguese Language Roots Album.

== Track listing ==
Batom Bacaba track listing
No.	Title	Writer(s)	Length
1.	"Loba Boba"	Joãozinho Gomes; Zeca Baleiro	3:58
2.	"Luz de Lampião"	Joãozinho Gomes; Nilson Chaves	4:37
3.	"O Desenho da Cidade"	Dante Ozzetti; Luiz Tatit	5:24
4.	"Mei Mei"	Joãozinho Gomes; Val Milhomem	3:50
5.	"Brisa e Brasa"	Dante Ozzetti; Luiz Tatit	4:04
6.	"Domingo de Páscoa"	Paulo Bastos	3:07
7.	"Batom Bacaba"	Enrico de Micelli; Joãozinho Gomes	4:21
8.	"Horizonte"	Dante Ozzetti; Joãozinho Mestre	4:16
9.	"O Batom que Não Viu"	Paulo Bastos	3:20
10.	"Tudinho Acessa"	Dante Ozzetti; Joãozinho Gomes	4:48
11.	"Manto d´Água"	Renato Rosas; Ronaldo Silva	2:55
12.	"Banto"	Paulo Bastos	4:34
13.	"Mameluca"	Joãozinho Gomes; Val Milhomem	4:45
Total length:			53:59
