= Remelexo Bom =

Studio album by Luiz Caldas
- Released: June 8, 2021
- Genre: Forró
- Length: 31:59
- Label: Independent

Luiz Caldas chronology
Esperança (2021)	Remelexo Bom (2021)	Águias e Urubus (2021)

Remelexo Bom is an album by Brazilian forró singer Luiz Caldas, released independently on June 8, 2021.

== Background ==
Luiz Caldas, one of the pioneers of Axé music, has recorded his eleventh forró album, continuing a tradition he started in 2013. Every June, a classic of the Saint John's Eve, he releases an album dedicated to the genre.

With the songs available on his website and released on music streaming platforms, Caldas released the album independently. The album featured musician Carlinhos Brown in a duet on the song “Carta de Zé,” composed by Cesar Rasec and Caldas.

== Track listing ==
Ref.:

No.	Title	Writer(s)	Length
1.	"Igual Bambu"	Luiz Caldas	3:06
2.	"Mas É Cada Uma!"	Luiz Caldas	3:01
3.	"Cheios de Treita"	Luiz Caldas	3:28
4.	"Carta de Zé" (with Carlinhos Brown)	Luiz Caldas, Cesar Resec	3:17
5.	"Faz a Vida Gargalhar"	Luiz Caldas	3:18
6.	"Quem Espera Sempre Alcança"	Luiz Caldas	2:54
7.	"Debaixo de Um Toró"	Luiz Caldas	3:02
8.	"É São João"	Luiz Caldas, Paulinho Caldas	3:31
9.	"O Pão Duro"	Luiz Caldas, Reinaldo Barbosa	3:10
10.	"Forró de Zé Bode"	Luiz Caldas, Cesar Resec	3:10
Total length:			31:59

== Accolades ==
Remelexo Bom was nominated for the 2022 Latin Grammy Awards in the category of Best Roots Album in Portuguese Language. At a ceremony held at Michelob Ultra Arena in Paradise, Nevada, United States, Caldas' album was surpassed by Senhora Estrada by Alceu Valença.

Awards and nominations for Remelexo Bom
Year	Award	Venue	Category	Result	Ref.
2022	Latin Grammy Awards	Michelob Ultra Arena, Paradise, Nevada, United States	Best Portuguese Language Roots Album	Nominated	
