= Talismã (album) =

Studio album by Maria Bethânia
- Released: 1980
- Genre: MPB, samba
- Label: PolyGram
- Producer: Perinho Albuquerque, Maria Bethânia

Maria Bethânia chronology
Mel (1979)	Talismã (1980)	Alteza (1981)

Professional ratings
Review scores
Source	Rating
AllMusic	5/5 stars
Blender	4/5 stars

Talismã is a studio album by Brazilian singer Maria Bethânia released in 1980.

== Track listing ==
From Biscoito Fino.

1. Vida real (Caetano Veloso)
2. Cansei de ilusões (Tito Madi)
3. Alguém me avisou feat. Caetano Veloso & Gilberto Gil (Yvonne Lara)
4. O Lado quente do ser (Marina Lima, Antonio Cícero)
5. Pele (Caetano Veloso)
6. Noite de um verão de sonho (Nelson Motta, Xixa Motta)
7. Mergulho (Gonzaguinha)
8. Eu tenho um pecado novo (Yo tengo un pecado nuevo) (M.Mores, A. Martinez, Version: Lourival Faissal)
9. Amo tanto viver (Gilberto Gil)
10. Gema (Caetano Veloso)
11. Mentira de amor (Lourival Faissal, Gustavo de Carvalho)
