= Maria Bethânia (album) =

Studio album by Maria Bethânia
- Released: June 1965
- Recorded: 1965
- Genre: Pop, MPB
- Length: 29:50
- Label: RCA
- Producer: Roberto Jorge

Maria Bethânia chronology
Maria Bethânia (1965)	Maria Bethânia canta Noel Rosa (1966)

Maria Bethânia is the self-titled debut studio album by Brazilian singer Maria Bethânia. It was first released in June, 1965, under RCA Victor label, as an LP in mono version. In 1971, the album was re-released in stereo mode under RCA Camden. In 1996, a remastered CD version was released by Sony BMG.

== Track listing ==
No.	Title	Writer(s)	Length
1.	"De Manhã"	Caetano Veloso	2:14
2.	"Só Eu Sei"	Batatinha, Oscar da Penha, J. Luna	2:16
3.	"Pombo Correio"	Benedito Lacerda, Darcy de Oliveira	2:10
4.	"No Carnaval"	Caetano Veloso, Jota	2:16
5.	"Nunca Mais"	Dorival Caymmi	3:13
6.	"Sol Negro" (feat. Gal Costa)	Caetano Veloso	2:00
7.	"Missa Agrária" / "Carcará"	Carlos Lyra, Gianfrancesco Guarnieri / João do Vale, José Cândido	3:10
8.	"Anda Luzia"	João do Vale, José Cândido	2:39
9.	"Feitio De Oração"	Noel Rosa, Vadico	2:24
10.	"Feiticeira"	Unknown	2:39
11.	"O X Do Problema"	Noel Rosa	2:23
12.	"Mora Na Filosofia"	Arnaldo Passos, Monsueto Menezes	2:21

== Personnel ==
- Maria Bethânia – vocals
- Roberto Jorge – producer
- Alberto Soluri – sound engineer
- Gauss – sound engineer
- Fernando Goldgaber – photography

== Formats ==
- Vinyl (1965) – the 12-track album in mono version.
- Vinyl (1971) – the 12-track album in stereo version.
- CD (1996) – Remastered edition of the stereo album.
