= Renato Teixeira =

Brazilian singer-songwriter

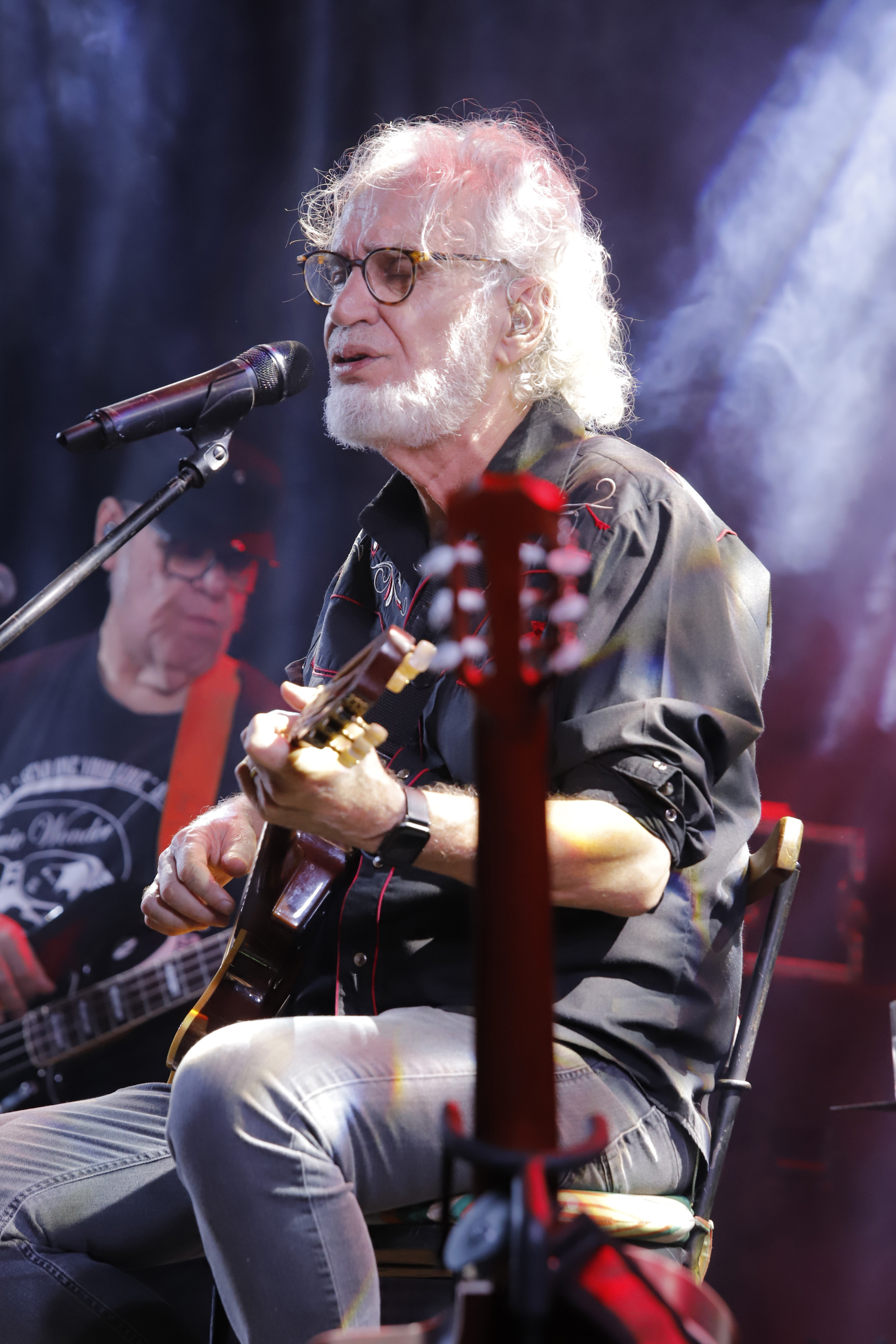
- Teixeira in 2022

Background information
- Born: Renato Teixeira de Oliveira; May 20, 1945 (age 81); Santos, São Paulo, Brazil
- Genres: sertanejo, música popular brasileira, folk rock
- Instruments: vocal, guitar, viola caipira

Renato Teixeira de Oliveira (born May 20, 1945) is a Brazilian singer-songwriter. He is a representative of sertanejo music and folk rock, linked to the caipira culture and dialect. Teixeira is the author of several hit songs including "Romaria", which was notably covered by Elis Regina in her eponymous 1977 album. Other hit songs by Teixeira were "Dadá Maria" (in duet with Gal Costa) and "Tocando em Frente" (in duet with Almir Sater), later sung also by Maria Bethânia. Teixeira won twice the Latin Grammy Award: in 2015 for Best Sertaneja Music Album, with Sérgio Reis, and in 2016, with Sater. His album +AR (with Sater) was ranked as the 44th best Brazilian album of 2018 by the Brazilian edition of Rolling Stone magazine and among the 25 best Brazilian albums of the second half of 2018 by the São Paulo Association of Art Critics.

== Discography ==
- 1969 - Maranhão e Renato Teixeira
- 1971 - Álbum de Família
- 1973 - Paisagem
- 1977 - Romaria
- 1979 - Amora
- 1980 - Garapa
- 1981 - Uma Doce Canção
- 1982 - Um Brasileiro Errante
- 1984 - Azul
- 1985 - Terra Tão Querida
- 1986 - Renato Teixeira
- 1990 - Amizade Sincera
- 1992 - Ao Vivo em Tatuí (with Pena Branca & Xavantinho)
- 1995 - Aguaraterra (with Xangai)
- 1996 - Sonhos Guaranis
- 1997 - Um Poeta e Um Violão
- 1998 - Ao Vivo no Rio
- 2000 - Alvorada Brasileira (with Natan Marques)
- 2000 - O Novo Amanhecer (with Zé Geraldo)
- 2002 - Cantoria Brasileira
- 2003 - Cirandas, Folias e Cantigas do Povo Brasileiro
- 2004 - Renato Teixeira e Rolando Boldrin
- 2007 - Ao Vivo No Auditório Ibirapuera
- 2010 - Amizade Sincera (with Sérgio Reis)
- 2015 - Amizade Sincera II (with Sérgio Reis)
- 2016 - AR (with Almir Sater)
