= Rolando Boldrin =

Brazilian television presenter, actor and singer (1936–2022)

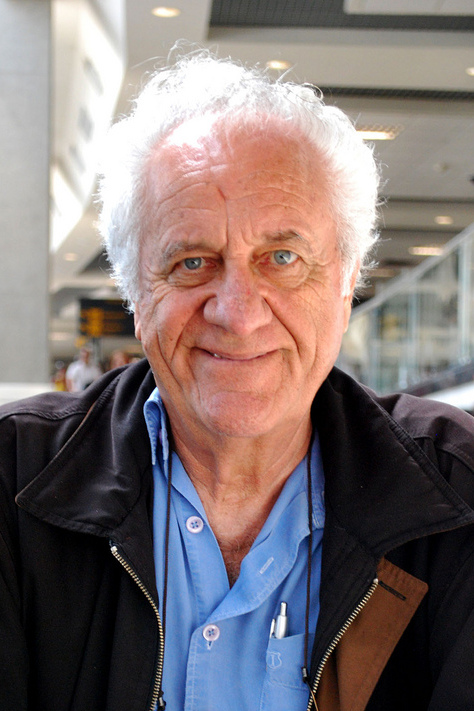
- Boldrin in 2009
- Born: 22 October 1936; São Joaquim da Barra, São Paulo, Brazil
- Died: 9 November 2022 (aged 86); São Paulo, Brazil
- Occupation(s): Actor, singer-songwriter, writer and TV presenter
- Spouse: Patrícia Maia Boldrin (m. 2009)
- Children: Vera Boldrin (daughter)
- Relatives: Beatriz Haddad Maia (niece)

Rolando Boldrin (22 October 1936 – 9 November 2022) was a Brazilian television presenter, actor, singer, writer and composer.

== Life and career ==
Born in São Joaquim da Barra, a grandson of Italian immigrants, Boldrin was the seventh of twelve children. He spent his childhood in Guaíra and while still a child he formed the musical duo Boy & Formiga with his brother Leili. At 16 years old, he moved to São Paulo where he worked at different jobs before winning an audition as an actor for the TV Tupi broadcaster in 1958. While his acting career progressed, with Boldrin getting bigger roles in TV-dramas and telenovelas, at the same time he was active as a singer and a composer, often collaborating with his wife, the singer Lurdinha Pereira, and sometimes collaborating on the musical scores of the telenovelas he was working on as an actor. In the 1980s, he got a massive success as a talk show host, first with Som Brasil on TV Globo, and later with other shows with similar formats such as Empório Brasileiro on Rede Bandeirantes and Empório Brasil on SBT. From 2005 until his death he hosted the TV Cultura talk show Sr. Brasil.

During his career Boldrin appeared in over 30 telenovelas and recorded over 250 songs. He also worked in cinema, on stage and on radio. He died of respiratory and renal failure, at the age of 86.

His niece the tennis player Bia Haddad, paid tribute to him on social media after his death in 2022.
