= Teca Calazans =

Brazilian singer-songwriter

- Born: Terezinha João Calazans; 20 October 1940 (age 85); Vitoria, Espírito Santo, Brazil
- Occupation: Singer-songwriter
- Years active: 1964–2015
- Musical career
- Genres: MPB, pop

Terezinha "Teca" João Calazans (born 20 October 1940) is a Brazilian singer-songwriter.

== Biography ==
Born in Vitoria, the daughter of a mandolin player and the granddaughter of a conductor, Calazans began her professional career in 1964 as a member of the music and stage ensemble Construção, which also included Naná Vasconcelos and Geraldo Azevedo.

Calazans made her record debut in 1967 with the single "Aquela rosa/Cirandas". After some television and stage experiences in 1970 she moved to France, where she formed the successful duo "Teca & Ricardo" with musician Ricardo Villas. After the dissolution of the duo in 1981, Calazans returned to Brazil, where she reprised her solo career and also worked as a songwriter for other prominent artists such as Gal Costa, Milton Nascimento, and Nara Leão. In the late 1980s she eventually decided to settle permanently in Paris, where she continued her musical activities.

In 2002 Calazans was nominated for Best Portuguese Language Roots Album at the 4th Annual Latin Grammy Awards for the album Cantoria Brasileira.
