= Itapebi =

Municipality of Bahia, Brazil

Coordinates: 15°56′S 39°32′W

- Municipality
- Interactive map of Itapebi
- Country: Brazil
- Region: Nordeste
- State: Bahia

Population (2020)
  - Total: 10,215
- Time zone: UTC−3 (BRT)

Itapebi is a municipality in the state of Bahia in the North-East region of Brazil.

== See also ==
- List of municipalities in Bahia
