= Mel (album) =

Studio album by Maria Bethânia
- Released: 1979
- Recorded: 1979
- Genre: MPB, samba
- Length: 28:29
- Label: PolyGram
- Producer: Perinho Albuquerque, Maria Bethânia

Maria Bethânia chronology
Álibi (1978)	Mel (1979)	Talismã (1980)

Professional ratings
Review scores
Source	Rating
AllMusic	3/5 stars

Mel is a studio album by Brazilian singer Maria Bethânia, released in 1979.

== Critical reception ==
The New York Times praised the title track, writing that Bethânia "declaims the highly poetic, startlingly sexual words as if singing a national anthem, and yet the song remains sly and infectious."

== Track listing ==
No.	Title	Writer(s)	Length
1.	"Mel"	Caetano Veloso, Waly Salomão	3:49
2.	"Ela e Eu"	Caetano Veloso	2:21
3.	"Cheiro de Amor"	Paulo Sérgio Valle, Ribiero	2:21
4.	"Da Cor Brasileira"	Ana Terra	2:56
5.	"Loucura"	Lupicínio Rodrigues	2:42
6.	"Gota de Sangue"	Ângela Ro Ro	2:30
7.	"Grito de Alerta"	Luiz Gonzaga Jr.	2:30
8.	"Lábios de Mel"	Waldir Rocha	2:47
9.	"Amando Sobre Os Jornais"	Chico Buarque	2:20
10.	"Nenhum Verão"	Túlio Mourão	2:42
11.	"Infinito Desejo"	Luiz Gonzaga Jr.	2:45
12.	"Queda d'Água"	Caetano Veloso	1:07
Total length:			28:29
