= As Canções Que Você Fez Pra Mim =

As Canções que Você Fez pra Mim

Studio album by Maria Bethânia
- Released: 1993
- Recorded: London, England; Los Angeles, United States
- Genre: Música popular brasileira
- Length: 42:08
- Language: Portuguese
- Label: Polygram
- Producer: Guto Graça Mello

Maria Bethânia chronology
Olho d'Água (1992)	As Canções que Você Fez pra Mim (1993)	Las Canciones que Hiciste pra Mí (1994)

As Canções que Você Fez pra Mim is an album by Brazilian singer Maria Bethânia released in 1993 by Polydor Records. The album is a tribute to the singer-songwriter duo Roberto Carlos and Erasmo Carlos, containing only their creations.

== Context ==
Produced by Guto Graça Mello and Max Pierre, the album As Canções que Você Fez pra Mim by singer Maria Bethânia features the artist singing songs by Roberto Carlos and Erasmo Carlos, considered one of the country's leading songwriting duos. The album was recorded with the English Symphony Orchestra and conducted by British conductor Graham Preskett, in addition to arrangements by Brazilian musician Jaime Além, having been recorded in London and Los Angeles. A self-confessed fan of Roberto Carlos, Bethânia was responsible for bringing the musician together with members of Tropicália, including her brother, Caetano Veloso.

== Tracks ==
No.	Title	Writer(s)	Length
1.	"As Canções Que Você Fez Pra Mim"	Roberto Carlos, Erasmo Carlos	3:44
2.	"Olha"	Roberto Carlos, Erasmo Carlos	3:40
3.	"Fera Ferida"	Roberto Carlos, Erasmo Carlos	3:29
4.	"Palavras"	Roberto Carlos, Erasmo Carlos	4:35
5.	"Costumes"	Roberto Carlos, Erasmo Carlos	2:49
6.	"Detalhes"	Roberto Carlos, Erasmo Carlos	5:06
7.	"Você Não Sabe"	Roberto Carlos, Erasmo Carlos	3:10
8.	"Eu Preciso de Você"	Roberto Carlos, Erasmo Carlos	4:10
9.	"Seu Corpo"	Roberto Carlos, Erasmo Carlos	4:03
10.	"Você"	Roberto Carlos, Erasmo Carlos	2:58
11.	"Emoções"	Roberto Carlos, Erasmo Carlos	4:17

== Reception ==
The album is the singer's best-selling album of her entire career, selling over a million copies. According to journalist Tárik de Souza from Jornal do Brasil, in just one month the album had sold 100,000 copies. With its commercial success, the record label offered Bethânia a project for a second album interpreting songs by Roberto and Erasmo. The singer rejected the project.

In the follow year, she toured the album, starting at Canecão, a traditional concert hall in the city of Rio de Janeiro.

=== Critical response ===
Eduardo Rech from the Rio Grande do Sul newspaper O Folheto, criticized the album, stating that "in this special project, Bethânia sings exclusively songs composed by the duo Roberto and Erasmo. The singer's voice is recognizable from miles away, giving it a certain personality. But nothing more can be done in relation to these songs. It's as if the King (as Roberto Carlos is called) had caught a cold". José Carlos Assumpção from O Fluminense praised Bethânia's album, calling her choice to remain “faithful to the original versions a bold move” and saying that only “established singers are capable of personalizing classics.”

Tárik de Souza from Jornal do Brasil, classified the album as a “careful selection from Roberto's repertoire” and called it “modern.”

== Legacy ==
The song was the opening theme for the soap opera Fera Ferida, written by Aguinaldo Silva and broadcast by TV Globo.

In a poll of 162 music experts conducted by the Discoteca Básica podcast, the album ranked 309th, one of five albums by the singer in her solo career mentioned on the list. In October 2024, a new version of Long Play was released by Universal Music, featuring a smoky translucent blue color.

== Las Canciones Que Hiciste pra Mí ==
Las Canciones que Hiciste pra Mí

Studio album by Maria Bethânia
- Released: 1994
- Length: 42:15
- Language: Spanish
- Label: PolyGram
- Producer: Guto Graça Mello

Maria Bethânia chronology
As Canções que Você Fez pra Mim (1993)	Las Canciones que Hiciste pra Mí (1994)	Maria Bethânia ao Vivo (1995)

Las Canciones que Hiciste pra Mí is a studio album by Maria Bethânia with the same repertoire as the album As Canções que Você Fez pra Mim, but seven of the eleven songs are versions in Spanish, with the same arrangements as the other album. The version of As Canções que Você Fez pra Mim was written by Roberto Livi; the version of Emoções was written by Luis Gomez Escobar, and the versions of the other songs were written by Buddy Mary McCluskey.

== Tracks ==
No.	Title	Writer(s)	Length
1.	"Las Canciones Que Hiciste Para Mí"	Roberto Carlos, Erasmo Carlos	3:43
2.	"Olha"	Roberto Carlos, Erasmo Carlos	3:41
3.	"Fiera Herida"	Roberto Carlos, Erasmo Carlos	3:33
4.	"Palabras"	Roberto Carlos, Erasmo Carlos	4:40
5.	"Cotumes"	Roberto Carlos, Erasmo Carlos	2:49
6.	"Detalhes"	Roberto Carlos, Erasmo Carlos	5:09
7.	"Tú No Sabes"	Roberto Carlos, Erasmo Carlos	3:10
8.	"Necesito De Tu Amor"	Roberto Carlos, Erasmo Carlos	4:11
9.	"Seu Corpo"	Roberto Carlos, Erasmo Carlos	4:03
10.	"Tú"	Roberto Carlos, Erasmo Carlos	3:00
11.	"Emociones"	Roberto Carlos, Erasmo Carlos	4:16

== Musicians ==
The following musicians worked on this album:

- Jaime Alem: acoustic guitar
- Pedro Ivo Lunardi: electric bass
- Victor Biglione: guitar
- Jurim Moreira: drums
- Daniel Higgins: saxophones
- Bill Reichenbach Jr.: trombone
- Jerry Hey: trumpet
- Gary Grant: trumpet
- Márcio Lomiranda: piano
