= Spanish guitar =

Spanish guitar may refer to:

- Classical guitar, a six-stringed guitar with nylon strings
- Flamenco guitar, similar to a classical guitar but commonly found in Spain and Latin America
- "Spanish Guitar" (song), a 2000 song by Toni Braxton
- "Spanish Guitar", a 1971 song by Gene Clark from his album White Light
- "Spanish Guitar", a 1978 song by Gary Moore from his album Back on the Streets
