= Almir Sater =

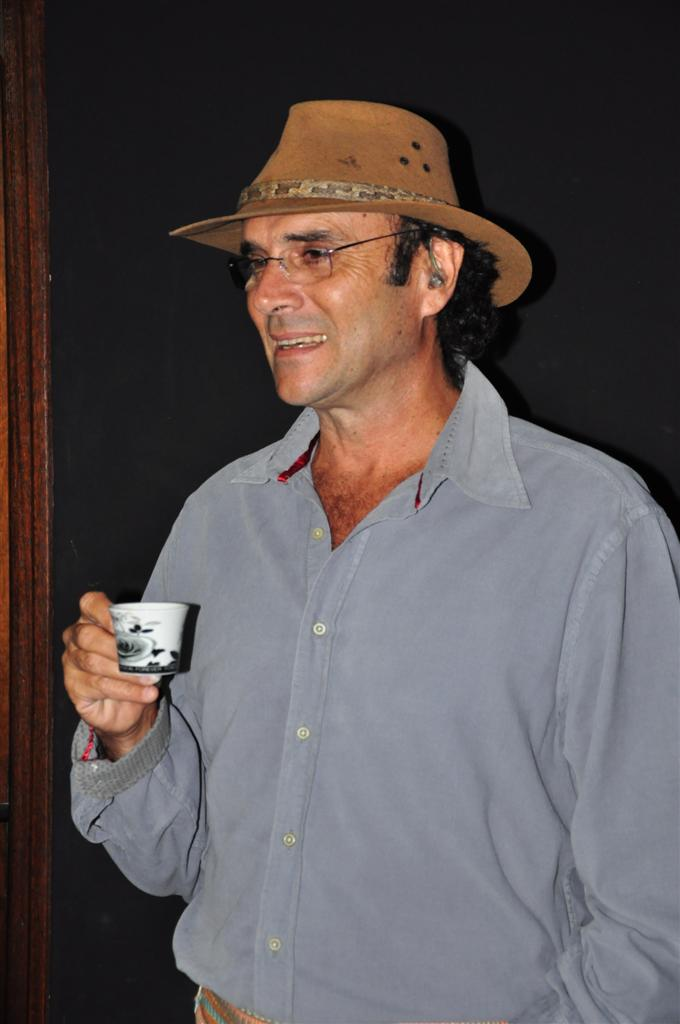
- Sater in 2011

Background information
- Born: Almir Eduardo Melke Sater; 14 November 1956 (age 69); Campo Grande, Mato Grosso do Sul, Brazil
- Genres: Folk; blues; sertanejo; chamamé; guarania
- Occupations: Singer, songwriter, actor
- Instrument: Viola caipira
- Years active: 1981–present
- Label: Velas

Almir Eduardo Melke Sater (born 14 November 1956) is a Brazilian singer-songwriter and actor.

== Early life and career ==
Born in Campo Grande, Mato Grosso do Sul, Sater went to Rio de Janeiro when was 20 to attend the Law School of Universidade Cândido Mendes. Influenced by Tião Carreiro & Pardinho, Tonico & Tinoco, Délio & Delinha, he started his singing career under the pseudonym Lupe in a duo called Lupe and Lampião. After being featured on Tetê Espíndola's band Lírio Selvagem in 1979, which was dissolved the same year, his composition, "Sonhos guaranis", was recorded by Sérgio Reis in 1980.

His debut studio album was published in 1981 by Continental Records and mixed sertanejo with blues and local genres like Paraguayan polka, guarania and chamamé. In 1982 he started to write collaboratively with Renato Teixeira, a frequent contributor. In 1986, he debuted as an actor on Ozualdo Candeias's film As Bellas da Billings. He acted on Rede Manchete's Pantanal in 1990. In addition his song "Tocando em Frente" performed by Maria Bethânia won the awards for Song of the Year in the Special Category and Best Song in the MPB Category at the 1991 Sharp Awards. Renato Teixeira, one of the singer-songwriters who composed the song, considered it "the basis of country music, which inspires music throughout Brazil". On the other hand, Extra.Globo considered it to be "a pearl of country music." In the following year, he starred on A História de Ana Raio e Zé Trovão. He was one of the best-selling composers of record label Velas in the 1990s. After a ten-year hiatus, Sater released 7 Sinais in 2007.

His album +AR (with Renato Teixeira) was ranked as the 44th best Brazilian album of 2018 by the Brazilian edition of Rolling Stone magazine and among the 25 best Brazilian albums of the second half of 2018 by the São Paulo Association of Art Critics.

== Discography ==
- Estradeiro (1981)
- Doma (1982)
- Almir Sater Instrumental (1985)
- Cria (1986)
- Rasta Bonito (1989)
- Instrumental Dois (1989)
- Almir Sater Ao Vivo (1992)
- Terra de Sonhos (1994)
- Almir Sater no Pantanal (1996)
- Caminhos Me Levem (1997)
- 7 Sinais (2007)
