= Patativa do Assaré =

Brazilian poet (1909–2002)

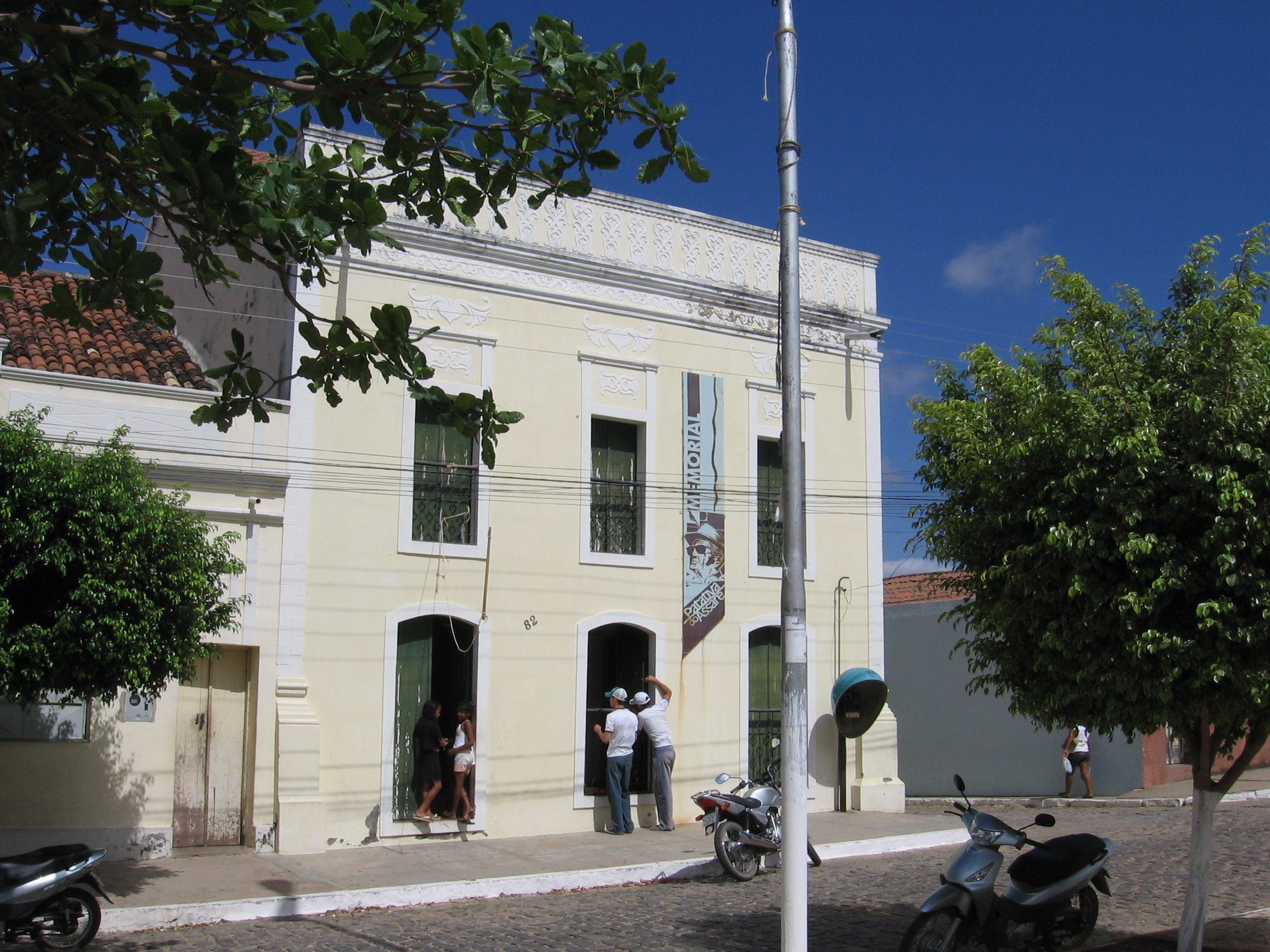

Antônio Gonçalves da Silva, popularly known as Patativa do Assaré, (Assaré, 5 March 1909 — 8 July 2002) was a popular Brazilian oral poet, improviser of oral verse, composer, singer and guitar player. One of the main articulators of the Brazilian North-eastern oral poetry of the 20th century.

== Short biography ==
Patativa was born in Serra de Santana, Assaré, a small town in the State of Ceará located in the Northeast of Brazil. This region is famous for being the place of origin of most Brazilian oral / folk traditions as well as for presenting one of the biggest social gaps in the country, with multiple disadvantaged communities living in extreme poverty in the backlands (sertão).

Patativa was the second son of a poor family of peasants who lived from subsistence agriculture. As a result of an illness and lack of medical assistance in the region, he went blind of one eye at the age of four. He was eight years old when his father died and he had to start working as a ploughman to help his family. Patativa never had a formal education, having studied for only four months, learning just to read and write. However, he started composing his own poems even with his limited learning. At sixteen, he sold a sheep to buy a guitar. From then on he started to play and recite poems in local parties and became more and more popular. At nineteen, he was taken to Pará by a relative. It was there he was given the nickname ‘Patativa do Assaré’ by José Carvalho, a journalist who published his poems in the local newspaper. ('Patativa' is the name of a local little bird of plain appearance, but with a powerful singing. The singing of one bird often gives the impression there are more than one.) On his way back to his hometown he met the famous popular poet Juvenal Galeno. After coming back he resumed his agricultural work, but never stopped composing. Patativa got married in 1936 and had nine children.

Patativa created his poems while working with the land and stored them in memory. He was constantly invited to recite in local radio programs in Feira do Crato, a nearby city. In one of those occasions he was heard by José Arraes de Alencar, a philologist, who convinced of his potential, gives him the support and the incentive for the publication of his first book of poems entitled Inspiração Nordestina (1956). National fame would come in 1964 when popular singer, Luiz Gonzaga, recorded one of his poems, Triste Partida. During the dictatorship years, Patativa was involved with the resistance and was persecuted but never stopped working as a ploughman. The second edition of Inspiração Nordestina was published in 1967 with additions as Cantos do Patativa. In 1970 he publishes a new collection of poems: Patativa do Assaré: novos poemas comentados; and in 1978 comes one of his most popular books: Cante lá que eu canto cá. His first LP was recorded in 1979, the same year he received honours from SBPC (Sociedade Brasileira para o Progresso da Ciência) and also campaigned for the amnesty of those who were convicted of political crimes during the dictatorship. Another popular singer, Fagner, records his poem Vaca Estrela e Boi Fubá, spreading his name to an even wider audience. In 1984 he campaigned for the Diretas Já movement. Two other important publications were Ispinho e Fulô and Aqui tem coisa, launched in 1988 and 1994, respectively. Then came other books, records, short-movies and documentaries. In his last years, Patativa achieved national fame, not just in popular sectors, was constantly in the media and was even included as a subject of study in Sorbonne by Professor Raymond Cantel. He was awarded several prizes, titles, medals and honours, including five titles of Doctor Honoris Causa. However, he never ceased being a peasant / ploughman and never left his hometown. He used to say that his art has never been his profession, and that he never aspired to fame.

In the beginning of the nineties he was already completely blind and walking with difficulty (as a result of an accident he had in Rio de Janeiro in 1973). He could barely hear as well, but still had his incredible power of memory and his sharp thinking.

== Work ==
Patativa do Assaré was not only the voice of the North-eastern peasant and agricultural workers, but of the disadvantaged, marginalised, and oppressed. His poetry, though rooted in a specific context, is at the same time universal because it encompasses the feeling of a social class with the authenticity of someone who comes from and speaks to ‘the people’.

To say that Patativa was a poet is too restricting in view of the multifaceted personality and artist that he was. Memory, singing, poetic and intellectual skills, added to the fact that he was an excellent performer meant that he could transit into different fields of popular / oral arts. In Northeast Brazil there are several distinct characteristics that differentiate a poet from a popular poet, an oral poet, an improviser of oral verse (improvisador, repentista), a composer, a singer and player, a cordelista, a poeta de bancada, and other denominations – each requiring a certain skill and talent. Patativa would fluctuate in all those but would call himself a ‘poeta popular’. The main characteristic of his work being the remarkable trace of orality.

Unlike the cordelistas, Patativa would not adapt or re-create from existing material. He would create / compose / edit and store his entire production in memory. When transcribed, it inevitably lost a significant part of the non-verbal meaning (expressed by the voice, intonation, pauses, rhythm, facial and body language, gestures), which highlighted certain elements that are conveyed only in the act of performing (such as irony, hesitation, boldness, etc.). The complexity of his work is also evident in his capacity to create poems both in the ‘classical’ (sonnets, Camões’ metric) and in the popular styles (i.e. the décima and the sextilha). He would choose between using ‘normative’ Portuguese and peoples’ or peasants’ Portuguese, which he called linguagem matuta.

The chameleonic easiness with which Patativa moved from one position to the other, as well as his intellectual / poetic / creative capacity have still not been fully understood and explored by academics. Contrary to what is generally known, there are other dimensions to his work other than the socio-political / militant thread, including: the telluric, religious, philosophic, lyric, ironic / humouristic, and others. There have been multiple attempts to categorise his work, which was most of the times done subjectively. That exposes flaws inherent in the parameters of judgement - in his case, based on presuppositions and prejudices that split his critique in two poles: the romanticised representation of the myth on one side and the ‘elitist’ on the other. The latter on the basis of social class, level of education, etc. Therefore, the boundaries between man, myth and his actual work are blurred in just a single persona, whose talents are reflected into a multi-faceted oeuvre. The dimension of which should not be measured by his printed legacy – the published books – since those represent just a small percentage of all he created.

== Awards and honours ==
•Five Titles of Doctor Honoris Causa from universities of the Northeast in 1989, 1999 (2), 2000 and 2005;
•Opening of the Patativa do Assaré Public Library in Piauí, 2005;
•Awarded the Medalha Ambientalista Joaquim Feitosa, 2005;
•EFESO (Escola de Formação de Empreendedores Sociais) Title, 2004;
•Homage from the MST (Landless Movement), MST Trophy 2004;
•UniPaz Prize, V Congresso Holístico de Crianças e Jovens, Fortaleza, 2003;
•FIEC Prize, Artista do Turismo Cearense, Fortaleza, 2002;
•Sereia de Ouro Prize, Fundação Roberto Marinho, Sist. Verdes Mares, 2001;
•Third Prize in the Cearense do Século Competition, 2001;
•Patron of the IV Bienal do Livro do Ceará, 2000;
•Received the Title of Cidadão do Rio Grande do Norte, 2000;
•UniPaz Prize, VII Congresso Holístico Brasileiro, 1999;
•Opening of the Memorial Patativa do Assaré (Museum dedicated to him and his work), 1999;
•Homage from Associação dos Docentes da Universidade Federal do Ceará, 1998;
•Homage in a Sessão Solene from Assembléia Legislativa do Estado de São Paulo, 1998;
•Received the Medalha Francisco Gonçalves de Aguiar, from Governo do Estado do Ceará, 1998;
•Opening of the Rádio Comunitária Patativa do Assaré, 1997;
•Fernando Henrique Cardoso gives him the Prize Prêmio Ministério da Cultura, in the category of Popular Culture, 1995;
•Nominated Honorary Member of the Museu do Gonzagão, 1994;
•Opening of the Centro de Cultura Popular Patativa do Assaré, 1994;
•Samba-enredo of the Escola Acadêmicos do Samba, 1991;
•Opening of the Patativa do Assaré motorway by the Governor Tasso Jereissati, 1989;
•Samba-enredo of the Escola de Samba Prova de Fogo, 1989;
•Received the Medalha da Abolição, by the State of Ceará government, 1987;
•Received the Title of Cidadão de Fortaleza, awarded by Câmara Municipal, 1982;
•Received the diploma of Amigo da Cultura by the Secretaria da Cultura do Estado, 1982;
•Homage by the Sociedade Brasileira para o Progresso da Ciência, 1979.

== Books of poetry ==
•1956 - Inspiração Nordestina
•1967 - Inspiração Nordestina: Cantos do Patativa
•1978 - Cante Lá que Eu Canto Cá
•1988 - Ispinho e Fulô
•1991 - Balceiro. Patativa e Outros Poetas de Assaré (Org. with Geraldo Gonçalves de Alencar)
•1993 - Cordéis (box containing 13 folhetos)
•1994 - Aqui Tem Coisa
•2001 - Balceiro 2. Patativa e Outros Poetas de Assaré (Org. Geraldo Gonçalves de Alencar)
•2001 - Ao pé da mesa (co-author Geraldo Gonçalves de Alencar)
•2002 - Antologia Poética (Org. Gilmar de Carvalho)

== Discography ==
•1979 - Poemas e canções
•1981 - A terra é naturá
•1985 - Patativa do Assaré (Projeto Cultural do BEC)
•1989 - Canto nordestino - 80 anos de luz
•1994 - 85 anos de poesia
•1995 - Patativa do Assaré 88 anos de poesia
•1999 - Patativa do Assaré - CD included in the book “O Poeta do Povo. Vida e Obra do Patativa do Assaré”, by Assis Ângelo.
