= Tião Carreiro & Pardinho =

Brazilian sertanejo musical duo

Tião Carreiro e Pardinho
- Origin: Monte Azul, Minas Gerais, Brazil (Tião Carreiro); São Carlos, São Paulo, Brazil (Pardinho)
- Genre: Sertanejo
- Years active: 1958–1993
- Members: Tião Carreiro (José Dias Nunes); Pardinho (Antônio Henrique de Lima)

Tião Carreiro & Pardinho (also known as Tião Carreiro e Pardinho) is a Brazilian sertanejo musical duo.

Tião Carreiro (real name: José Dias Nunes), born in Monte Azul, in the Brazilian state of Minas Gerais, started to learn how to play the acoustic guitar at a very young age. Later, only 13, he went to work in the Giglio Circus, where he made a music pair with his cousin Waldomiro. The circus owner encouraged Tião to learn the viola caipira (a kind of steel ten-string acoustic guitar). Tião Carreiro played along with various other violeiros (viola caipira players that create música caipira or Brazilian country music).

He reached fame with Pardinho (real name: Antônio Henrique de Lima), consolidating the music double as Tião Carreiro e Pardinho. Alongside Pardinho, Tião Carreiro is credited as the inventor of the Pagode (not to be confused with the Pagode style of Samba), the rural Pagode (Pagode Caipira).

== Influenced ==
Among the violeiros such as César Menotti & Fabiano, Chitãozinho & Xororó, Milionário e José Rico among others, Tião Carreiro e Pardinho are viewed as one of the most influential songwriters/singers of the Música Sertaneja style of Brazilian popular music.

== Major Hits ==
Between their major hits we have: Pagode em Brasília (en.: "Pagode in Brasília"), their first success (recorded in 1959), Boi Soberano (en.: "Sovereign Ox"), Filhinho de Papai (en.: "Daddy's Little Son") and Cochilou o Cacimbo Cai (en.: "If You Sleep You Lose the Pipe"). The complete discography sums to up to 45 albums, being, nowadays, considered to be one of the most influential Brazilian caipira pairs of all time.

== Discography (albums) ==
- 1961- Rei do Gado
- 1962- Meu Carro é Minha Viola
- 1963- Casinha da Serra
- 1964- Linha de Frente
- 1964- Repertório de Ouro
- 1965- Os Reis do Pagode
- 1966- Boi Soberano
- 1967- Pagode na Praça
- 1967- Os Grandes Sucessos de Tião Carreiro e Pardinho
- 1967- Rancho dos Ipês
- 1968- Encantos da Natureza
- 1968- Tião Carreiro e Pardinho e Seus Grandes Sucessos
- 1969- Em Tempo de Avanço
- 1970- Sertão em Festa
- 1970- Show
- 1970- A Força do Perdão
- 1971- Abrindo Caminho
- 1972- Hoje eu Não Posso Ir
- 1973- Sucessos de Tião Carreiro e Pardinho
- 1973- Viola Cabocla
- 1973- A Caminho do Sol
- 1974- Modas de Viola Classe "A"
- 1974- Esquina da Saudade
- 1974- Tangos em Dueto
- 1975- Modas de Viola Classe "A" - vol. 2
- 1975- Duelo de Amor
- 1976- Os Grandes Sucessos de Tião Carreiro e Pardinho vol. 2
- 1976- É Isto que o Povo Quer - Tião Carreiro em Solos de Viola Caipira
- 1976- Rio de Pranto
- 1977- Pagodes
- 1977- Rancho do Vale
- 1978- Terra Roxa
- 1978- Viola Divina
- 1979- Disco de Ouro
- 1979- Golpe de Mestre
- 1979- Pagodes vol. 02
- 1979- Tião Carreiro em Solo de Viola Caipira
- 1979- Seleção de Ouro
- 1980- Homem até Debaixo d´água
- 1981- Prato do Dia
- 1981- 4 Azes - Tião Carreiro & Paraiso & Pardinho & Pardal
- 1981- Modas de Viola Classe "A" - vol 3
- 1982- Navalha na Carne
- 1983- No Som da Viola
- 1984- Modas de Viola Classe "A" - vol 4
- 1985- Felicidade
- 1986- Estrela de Ouro
- 1988- A Majestade do Pagode
- 1992- O Fogo e a Brasa
- 1994- Som da Terra
- 1994- Som da Terra - vol. 2 - Pagodes
- 1994- Som da Terra - vol. 3 - Modas de Viola
- 1996- Saudades de Tião Carreiro - Diversas Duplas
- 1998- Sucessos de Ouro - Tião Carreiro e Pardinho - As Românticas
- 1999- Popularidade
- 2001- Warner 25 anos
