= Roberto Carlos em Ritmo de Aventura =

Roberto Carlos em ritmo de aventura
- Directed by: Roberto Farias
- Written by: Roberto Farias; Paulo Mendes Campos
- Starring: Roberto Carlos José Lewgoy Reginaldo Faria
- Distributed by: United Artists
- Release date: 1968
- Running time: 90 minutes
- Country: Brazil
- Language: Portuguese

Roberto Carlos em ritmo de aventura is a 1968 Brazilian musical comedy film directed by Roberto Farias, with screenplay written by Paulo Mendes Campos. The film is the first of a trilogy directed by Farias featuring the singer Roberto Carlos.

== Synopsis ==
Singer Roberto Carlos is making a film when he is chased by an international gang who want to kidnap him to the United States and force him to write songs.

== Soundtrack ==
The film soundtrack was released in 1967, a year before the movie. The record was ranked No. 24 in the list of Rolling Stone Brasil 100 Greatest Brazilian Music Records.

=== A side ===
1. "Eu Sou Terrível" (Roberto Carlos – Erasmo Carlos)
2. "Como É Grande o Meu Amor por Você" (Roberto Carlos)
3. "Por Isso Corro Demais" (Roberto Carlos)
4. "Você Deixou Alguém A Esperar" (Édson Ribeiro)
5. "De Que Vale Tudo Isso" (Roberto Carlos)
6. "Folhas De Outono" (Francisco Lara – Jovenil Santos)

=== B- side ===
1. "Quando" (Roberto Carlos)
2. "É Tempo De Amar" (Pedro Camargo – José Ari)
3. "Você Não Serve Pra Mim" (Renato Barros)
4. "E Por Isso Estou Aqui" (Roberto Carlos)
5. "O Sósia" (Getúlio Côrtes)
6. "Só Vou Gostar De Quem Gosta De Mim" (Rossini Pinto)

=== Lineup ===
- Roberto Carlos: voice and harmonica
- Renato Barros (Renato e seus Blue Caps): lead and solo guitar
- Paulo César Barros (Renato e seus Blue Caps): bass
- Lafayette: keyboard
- Tony (Renato e seus Blue Caps): drums

=== Certifications ===
Certifications for "em Ritmo de Aventura"
Region	Certification	Certified units/sales
Brazil (Pro-Música Brasil)	3× Diamond	3,000,000^{‡}
^{‡} Sales+streaming figures based on certification alone.

== Cast ==
- Roberto Carlos
- José Lewgoy
- Reginaldo Farias
- Rose Passini
- David Cardoso
- Jorge de Oliveira
- Márcia Gonçalves
- Jacques Jover
- Ana Levy
- Marisa Levy
- Sérgio Malta
- Federico Mendes
- Jannik C. Pagh
- Elizabeth Pereira
- Grace L. Silva
- Leopoldo Volks
- Guiomar Yukawa
