= Roberto Carlos e o Diamante Cor-de-rosa =

1970 film directed by Roberto Farias

Roberto Carlos e o Diamante Cor-de-Rosa
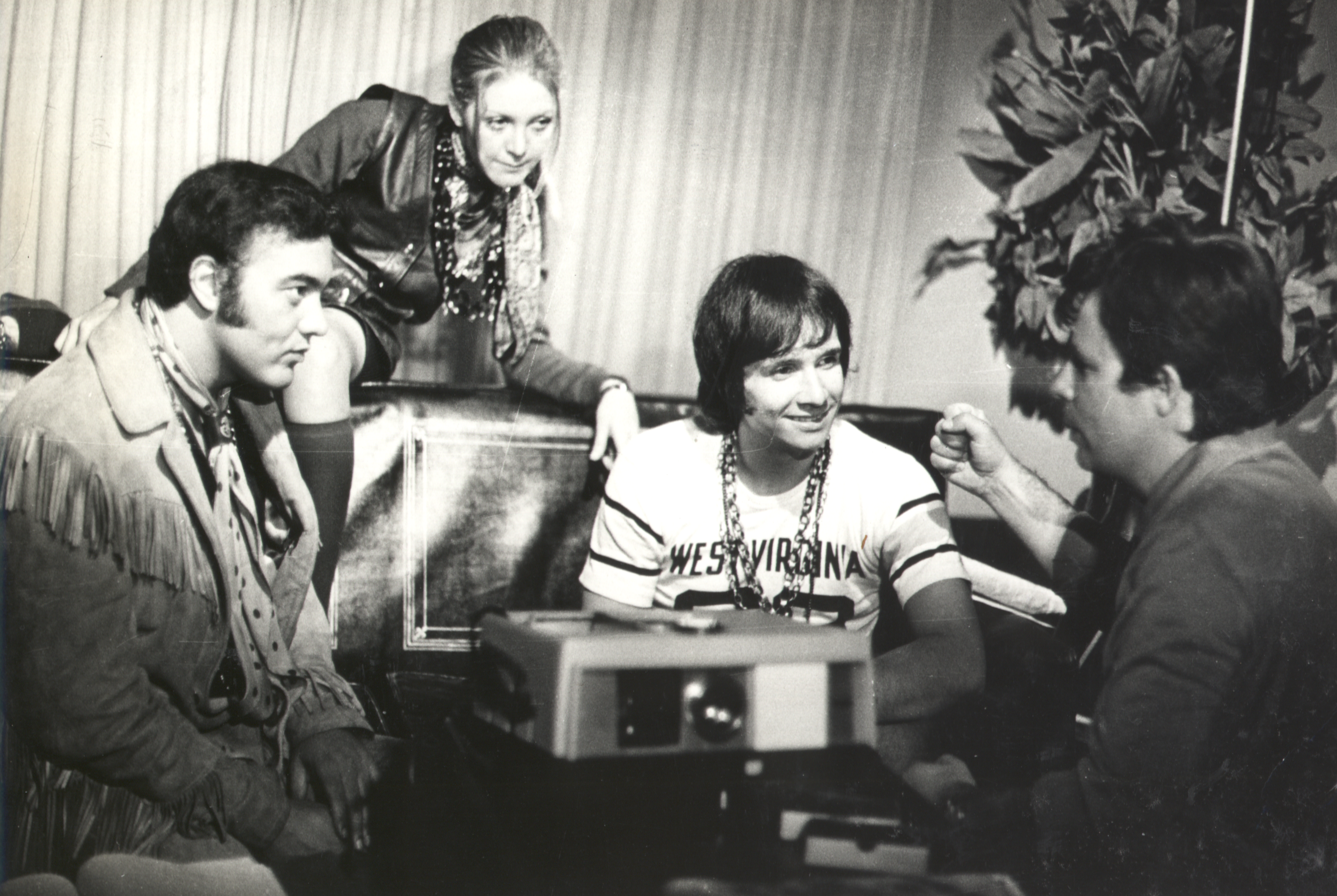
- Directed by: Roberto Farias
- Written by: Roberto Farias; Berilo Faccio
- Starring: Roberto Carlos José Lewgoy; Wanderléa Erasmo Carlos
- Release date: 1970
- Running time: 94 minutes
- Country: Brazil
- Language: Portuguese

Roberto Carlos e o Diamante Cor-de-Rosa is a Brazilian film released in July 1970, directed and produced by Roberto Farias. The film is the second of a trilogy featuring the singer Roberto Carlos; co-starring with him are his Jovem Guarda musical partners Erasmo Carlos and Wanderléa. It had an audience of 2,639,174 spectators, being the highest-grossing film in Brazil in 1970.

== Plot ==
The singers Roberto Carlos, Erasmo Carlos and Wanderléa are in Japan, when the latter decides to buy an old statuette. Immediately she and her companions begin to be pursued by Pierre, a mysterious man who leads a gang of oriental fighters. (Note: Though not directly mentioned, it is heavily implied that the gang of criminals the three protagonists are running from is the Yakuza (the Japanese mafia).) Roberto and Erasmo go to Israel, but they don't meet Wanderléa, who stays in Japan, prisoner of the bandits. In Israel, Roberto and Erasmo intend to return to look for the singer, but at the hotel they receive the statue, mysteriously. Soon after, a samurai genie (whom they call Eugenio) appears, who claims to protect the statue's owners. So they ask the genie to look for Wanderléa, which he does. With the three reunited, they discover an ancient Phoenician treasure map hidden in the statue. (Note: There is a widely famous theory that the Phoenicians somehow got to Brazil and hid a treasure in Pedra da Gávea, a monolithic mountain located in the Tijuca Forest, in Rio de Janeiro.) They try to decipher the map, but Pierre chases them back. When translating the map, Roberto thinks that the place described is in Brazil, in Guanabara Bay. So the singers go to Rio de Janeiro, still pursued by Pierre.

== Cast ==
- Teruo Nakatani
- Roberto Carlos
- José Lewgoy ... Pierre
- Erasmo Carlos
- Wanderléa
- Paulo Porto
