= Jovem Guarda (album) =

Studio album by Roberto Carlos
- Released: November, 1965
- Recorded: 1965
- Studio: CBS Studios, Rio de Janeiro
- Genre: Rock and roll; beat music; rock and roll; surf rock; rockabilly; mod; rhythm and blues
- Length: 31:44
- Label: Columbia
- Producer: Evandro Ribeiro

Roberto Carlos chronology
Canta a la Juventud (1965)	Jovem Guarda (1965)	Roberto Carlos ("Eu Te Darei O Céu") (1966)

Jovem Guarda is the fifth studio album by the Brazilian singer and writer Roberto Carlos, which was released in 1965.

The album was recorded with the Brazilian rock band The Youngsters in September from the same year. the pianist Lafayette also participated in the recording of tracks like "Escreva uma Carta meu Amor", "Mexerico da Candinha", "Eu Te Adoro", "Meu Amor" and the main track, that open the album and ended up being a big hit at the time.

== Recording ==
The album got its name from a TV program that was hosted by the singer in TV Record that ended up being a success in the 1960s. The idea to name this LP as Jovem Guarda was from the director of CBS, Othon Russo, arguing that will make the album be a success, like the Record program.

The band The Youngsters appears on the back cover and participated in every track, also having a prominent participation of the recording of this album, is the pianist Lafayette.

The album has the songs "Quero que Vá Tudo pro Inferno", one of the biggest success of the singer and also the opening track from this LP, "Lobo Mau", "O Feio", "Mexerico da Candinha", "Pega Ladrão" and "Não é Papo Pra Mim".

in 2007, this album was ranking by the magazine Rolling Stone Brasil as the 85th best Brazilian album of all time.

in 2013, the album was inducted into the Hall of fame of Grammy Latino.

== Track listing ==
No.	Title	Writer(s)	Length
1.	"Quero Que Vá Tudo Pro Inferno"	Roberto Carlos, Erasmo Carlos	3:58
2.	"Lobo Mau" (The Wanderer)	Ernest Maresca, Hamilton Di Giorgio	2:48
3.	"Coimbra"	José Galhardo, Raul Ferrão	2:41
4.	"Sorrindo Pra Mim"	Helena dos Santos	2:45
5.	"O Feio"	Renato Barros, Getúlio Côrtes	2:25
6.	"O Velho Homem do Mar"	Roberto Rei	1:55
7.	"Eu Te Adoro, Meu Amor"	Rossini Pinto	2:35
8.	"Pega Ladrão"	Getúlio Côrtes	2:20
9.	"Gosto do Jeitinho Dela"	Niquinho, Othon Russo	2:39
10.	"Escreva uma Carta, Meu Amor"	Pilombêta, Tito Silva	2:24
11.	"Não É Papo pra Mim"	Roberto Carlos, Erasmo Carlos	2:06
12.	"Mexerico da Candinha"	Roberto Carlos, Erasmo Carlos	3:02

== Personnel ==
- Roberto Carlos: vocals

=== The Youngsters ===
- Carlos Becker (rhythm guitars), Carlos Roberto (lead guitars), Sérgio Becker (saxophone), Jonas (bass) and Romir (drums)
- Background Vocals: The Youngsters
- Lafayette Coelho Varges Limp: keyboard (organ)

== Charts ==
year-end chart performance for Jovem Guarda
Chart (1966)	Peak position
Brazil (Nopem)	1 (Note: As Quero Que Vá Tudo Pro Inferno.)

== Certifications ==
Certifications for "Jovem Guarda"
Region	Certification	Certified units/sales
Brazil (Pro-Música Brasil)	Diamond	1,000,000^{‡}
^{‡} Sales+streaming figures based on certification alone.
