= Jesus Cristo (song) =

Single by Roberto Carlos

from the album Roberto Carlos
- Released: December 1970 (airplay); February 1971 (EP)
- Recorded: 1970
- Genre: Soul music
- Length: 3:25
- Label: CBS
- Songwriters: Roberto Carlos; Erasmo Carlos

Roberto Carlos singles chronology
"Ana" (1971)	"Jesus Cristo" (1970)	"Amada Amante" (1971)

Music video
- "Jesus Cristo" on YouTube

"Jesus Cristo" is a song by Roberto Carlos, released in 1971 as the third single from the album Roberto Carlos (1970). It is the first religious-themed song released by the singer in his career and is one of his greatest hits. The song has been covered in English, Spanish, French, Italian, and Finnish.

== Composition ==
Roberto Carlos got inspiration for the song from musicals like Hair and Jesus Christ Superstar, as well as from gospel music. He started composing the song on a Saturday afternoon in the summer of 1969 while staying in a hotel in Cascavel, Paraná, where he was scheduled to perform that evening. After coming up with the chorus, he called Erasmo Carlos, and the two worked intensively on the song for about six months.

Influenced by James Brown, Carlos wanted a soul sound, which Brazilian musicians at the time struggled to achieve it, and he planned to record the song in 1971, when he was scheduled to record an album at CBS Records studios in the U.S., but producer Evandro Ribeiro pushed to record it immediately, arguing that by the following year the theme would have risked becoming overused.

== Reception ==
In 1970, the year marked by Roberto Carlos's transition from Jovem Guarda to romantic music, the album Roberto Carlos was released, in which the single "Jesus Cristo" became the most popular song, becoming the third most-played song of the year in Brazil. Roberto Carlos's biographer, Paulo Cesar de Araújo, stated in his book Roberto Carlos em Detalhes that "no other Brazilian singer had until then evoked the name of Jesus Christ in a popular music chorus."

“Jesus Cristo” was unprecedented in Brazilian pop music, as no singer had previously invoked Jesus name in a danceable pop song; this sparked major controversy, especially among conservative sectors: the song was subject of television debates, accused of containing blasphemous subliminal messages, and federal deputy Newton Carneiro even campaigned to ban the song, claiming it was offensive to religious principles, and asked federal authorities to prosecute Carlos under the National Security Law. Carlos denied any hidden messages, insisting the lyrics were clear and purely religious, but avoided naming Jesus in any of his religious songs of the 1970s, using more indirect references instead; he eventually reintroduced the name in "Ele está pra chegar" (1981), where "Jesus" appears only at the end of the final verse.

== Other versions ==
The song's success led Roberto Carlos to record versions in Spanish and Italian, making it popular throughout Latin America. Lenny Kuhr recorded a French version that reached 73rd place on the French charts in December 1971. The song also received an English version by Alan Shelly & Equator, and a Finnish version written by Vexi Salmi and performed by Frederik.

== Track listing ==
EP 7" (CBS 56401)

A-side
No.	Title	Music	Length
1.	"Jesus Cristo"	Roberto Carlos/Erasmo Carlos	3:25
2.	"Uma Palavra Amiga"	Getúlio Côrtes	2:57
Total length:			6:22

B-side
No.	Title	Music	Length
3.	"Minha Senhora"	Roberto Carlos/Erasmo Carlos	3:09
4.	"Maior que o Meu Amor"	Renato Barros	3:00
Total length:			6:06
