= Roberto Carlos a 300 Quilômetros por Hora =

1971 film directed by Roberto Farias

Roberto Carlos a 300 quilômetros por hora
- Directed by: Roberto Farias
- Written by: Roberto Farias; Bráulio Pedroso
- Starring: Roberto Carlos Erasmo Carlos; Raul Cortez; Otelo Zeloni Libânia Almeida
- Release date: 1971
- Running time: 92 minutes
- Country: Brazil
- Language: Portuguese

Roberto Carlos a 300 Quilômetros por Hora is a Brazilian film first released in December 1971, directed and produced by Roberto Farias, and written by Bráulio Pedroso. The film had an audience of 2,785,922, making it the highest-grossing Brazilian film of 1971.

== Synopsis ==
Lalo (Roberto Carlos), a mechanic in a car dealer joins an auto racing team when his boss, the main driver, suffers an accident and becomes traumatized of racing.

== Main cast ==
- Roberto Carlos ... Lalo
- Erasmo Carlos ... Pedro Navalha
- Raul Cortez ... Rodolfo Lara
- Mário Benvenutti ... Alfredo
- Libânia Almeida ... Luciana (as Libânia)
- Cristina Martinez ... Neuza
- Flávio Migliaccio ... Luigi
- Otelo Zeloni ... Mané
- Reginaldo Faria ... Playboy
- Walter Forster
