= Roberto Carlos (singer) =

Brazilian singer-songwriter (born 1941)

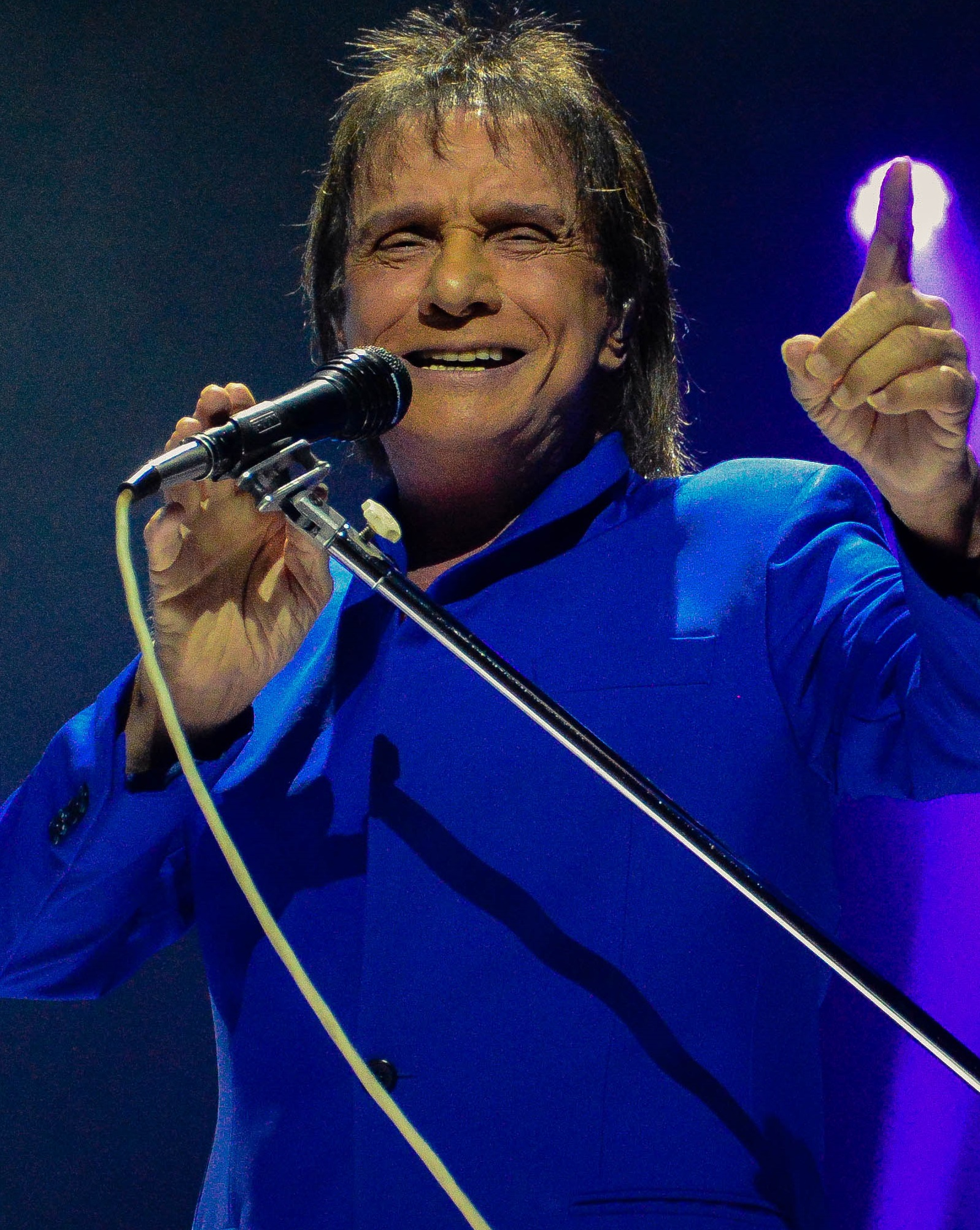
- Roberto Carlos in 2018

Background information
- Born: Roberto Carlos Moreira Braga; 19 April 1941 (age 85)
- Origin: Cachoeiro de Itapemirim, Espírito Santo, Brazil
- Genres: Jovem Guarda, MPB
- Occupations: Singer-songwriter; actor
- Instruments: Vocals; guitar
- Years active: 1959–present
- Website: robertocarlos.com

Roberto Carlos Moreira Braga (Brazilian Portuguese pronunciation: [ʁoˈbɛʁtu ˈkaʁlus]; born 19 April 1941) is a Brazilian singer-songwriter, also known as "King of Brazilian Music" or simply "the King". Most of his songs were written in partnership with his friend Erasmo Carlos (no relation). With over 140 million albums sold worldwide, Roberto Carlos is the best-selling Latin American music artist in history. He is considered one of the most influential artists in Brazil, being cited as a source of inspiration by many artists and bands. His net worth is estimated at US$160 million.

== Early life ==
Roberto Carlos Braga was born in Cachoeiro de Itapemirim, at the southern part of the Brazilian state of Espírito Santo. He is the fourth and last son of watchmaker Robertino Braga (27 March 1896 – 27 January 1980) and seamstress Laura Moreira Braga (10 April 1914 – 17 April 2010). The family lived in a modest home on top of a hill in the Nook neighbourhood. His siblings were Lauro Roberto Braga, Carlos Alberto Moreira Braga and Norminha. At age six, during the feast of St Peter, the patron saint of Cachoeiro do Itapemirim, Roberto Carlos was hit by a steam locomotive and had to have his right leg amputated just below his knee. He still uses a prosthesis, but avoids talking about it.

As a child he learned to play the guitar and the piano – first with his mother and later at the Itapemirim Music Conservatory. At nine years old, he performed for the first time at a children's show broadcast by Rádio Cachoeiro (he sang a bolero called "Mal Amor"). He won candies as the first prize. Years later, he recalled the occasion for the book Roberto Carlos Up Close, by Paulo Cesar de Araujo: "I was very nervous, yet very happy to be able to sing on the radio. I got a lot of candies, which was the prize for the kids who'd sing there. It was a beautiful day." He became a regular performer on that particular show.

== Career ==
=== 1960s ===
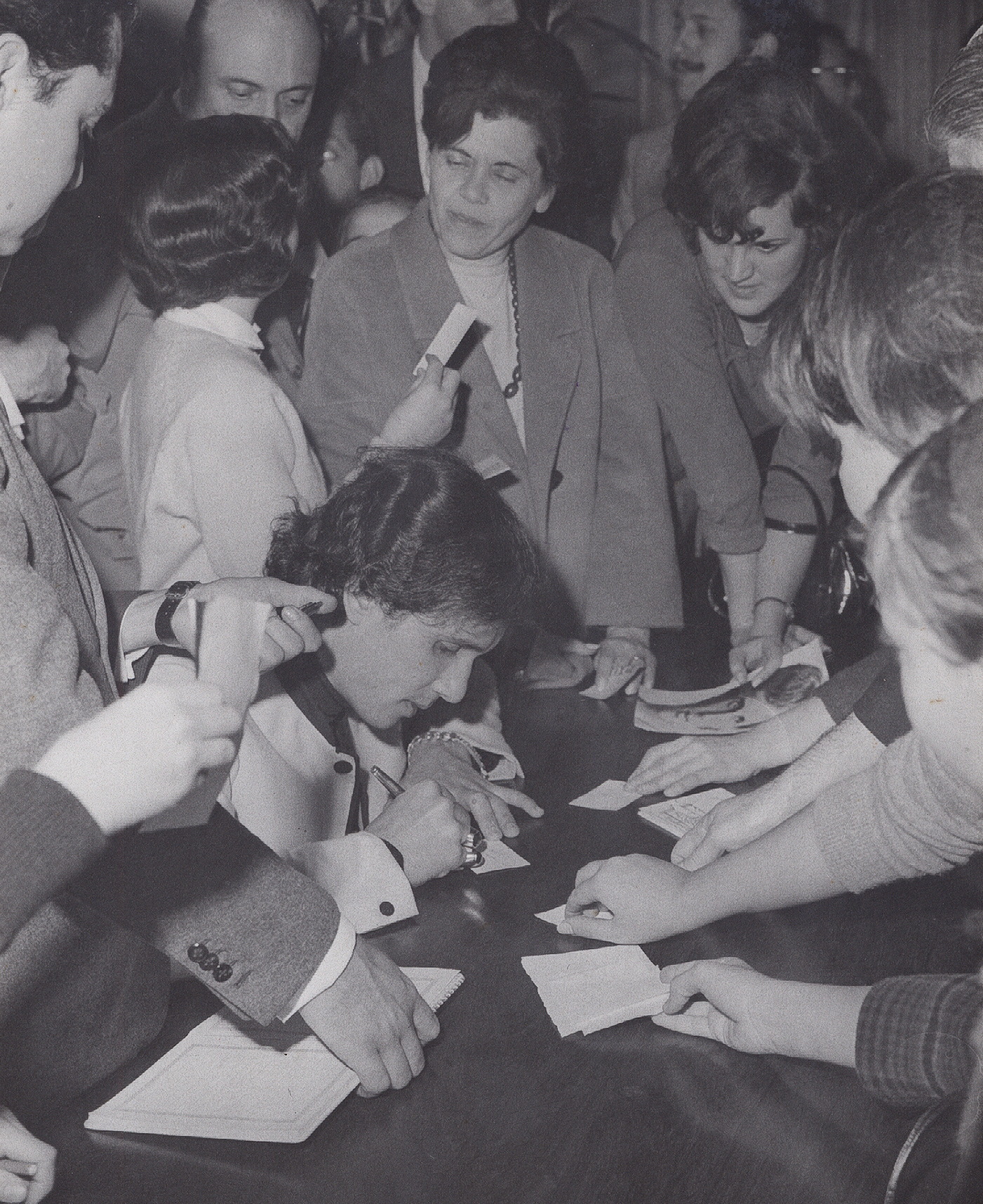
Roberto Carlos, 1966. National Archives of Brazil.

Influenced by his idol Elvis Presley and the 1950s rock revolution. In 1957, Tim Maia, Carlos, Arlênio Silva, Edson Trindade and Wellington started the vocal group The Sputniks. After a disagreement between Tim and Roberto, the group was disbanded. In the 60s, Carlos became known for the musical movement known as Jovem Guarda (or Young Guard), which was a rip off from another TV Show. From the same name "Jovem Guarda" was the first manifestation of the Brazilian pop rock movement. Since then, Roberto Carlos has been called "O Rei" (the King).

When his first single and first LP (Louco por você, 1961) were commercial failures, Roberto Carlos was in danger of being fired from CBS in favor of Sérgio Murilo, the first successful rock singer in Brazil. Nevertheless, Murilo was fired instead for clashing with musical director Evandro Ribeiro over repertoire and payment, opening up space for Roberto Carlos. During his first decade of recording, Roberto Carlos also starred in a few motion pictures directed by Roberto Farias, many of them inspired by the Beatles movies.

Jovem Guarda

Roberto Carlos insisted on investing time in young music, rock, and in 1962 released Splish Splash. With his friend Erasmo Carlos, Roberto recorded Portuguese versions of pop songs and wrote his own songs, such as "Parei Na Contramão" which became a hit. The following year the singer was back on the charts with the album É Proibido Fumar, in which, besides the title track, the highlight was the song "O Calhambeque". Thus was born the Jovem Guarda (TV Show).

Nationally known, Roberto Carlos began to host the Jovem Guarda TV program in 1965 at TV Record, along with Erasmo Carlos and Wanderléa. The program further popularized the pop rock movement in Brazil and established the singer, who became one of the first idols of the young Brazilian culture. Also in 1965, the albums Roberto Carlos Canta Para A Juventude – with hits "A Estoria do Homem Mau (Old Man Moses)," "Os Sete Cabeludos", "Eu Sou Fã Do Monoquini" and "Eu Não Quero Ver Você Triste" partnerships with Erasmo Carlos –and Jovem Guarda with the hits "Quero Que Vá Tudo Pro Inferno", "Lobo Mau", "O Feio" (Getúlio Cortes) and "Não É Papo Pra Mim" were released.

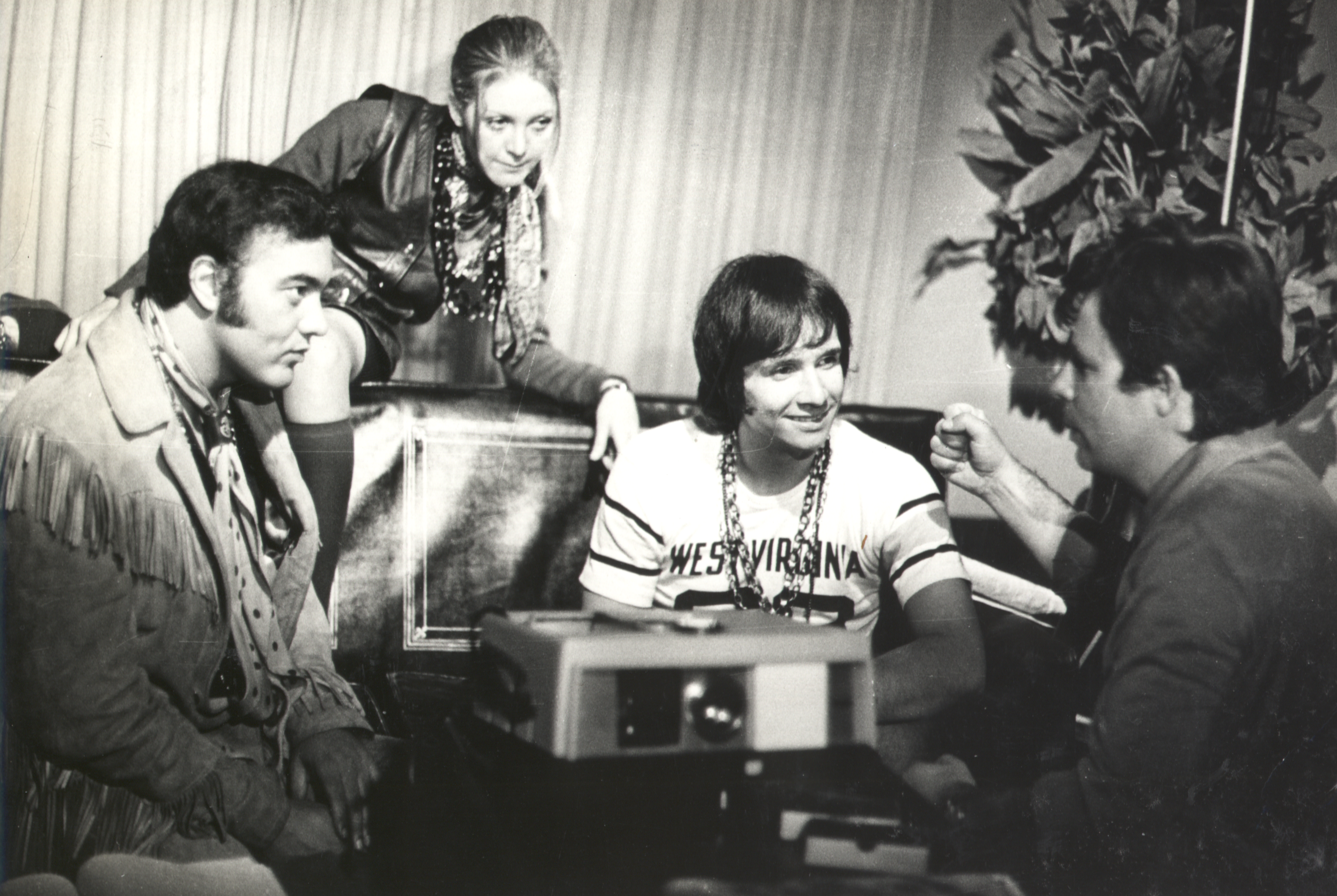
Roberto Carlos, Erasmo Carlos and Wanderléa in the movie Roberto Carlos e o Diamante Cor de Rosa, 1970. National Archives of Brazil.

In 1966, Carlos presented the programs "Roberto Carlos à Noite", "Opus 7", "Jovem Guarda em Alta Tensão" e "Todos os Jovens do Mundo", at TV Record, all of them short-lived. That year would be marked by a fight that nearly ended the partnership between him and Erasmo. The reason for the split was a failure of production of the "Show in Si Monal ..." TV Record, which paid homage to Erasmo. The production was to present a pot-pourri of Erasmo's most famous compositions, including "Parei na Contramão" and "Quero Que Vá Tudo Pro Inferno". The controversy was created because of these songs were composed in partnership with Roberto Carlos, but the credits were given only to Erasmo. The two quarreled, and the partnership was suspended for more than one year. During this period, Roberto wrote "We There Yet?" and "Namoradinha de Um Amigo Meu" were released on the LP "Roberto Carlos" that year (the album still had the hits "Eu Te Darei O Céu", "Esqueça", "Negro Gato" (Getúlio Cortes) and "Nossa Canção" (Luiz Ayrão).

In 1967, the friendship between Roberto and Erasmo was shaken, though the two still presented – along with Wanderléa – the "Jovem Guarda" show on TV Record. Roberto wrote his own hits like "Como É Grande Meu Amor Por Você", "Corro Demais", "Quando" and "De vale tudo isso?", which would be released on the LP "Roberto Carlos em Ritmo de Aventura" soundtrack of movie with the same name, released the following year. The film was produced and directed by Roberto Farias and featured Roberto Carlos as protagonist, with José Lewgoy and Reginaldo Faria in the cast. The film became a box office success in the Brazilian cinema. With his many professional commitments, Roberto could not finish the lyrics for "Eu Sou Terrível", which was to be the starting soundtrack of the feature. He asked his former partner Erasmo Carlos, who helped finalize the lyrics. Thus, friendship and partnership between the two resumed. Later that year, Roberto Carlos had his first performances abroad, in Cannes (France) and participated in several Brazilian Pop Music festivals. He placed fifth with the song "Maria Carnaval e Cinzas" (Luís Carlos Paraná). Some people objected to the presence of a Jovem Guarda icon.

In 1968 the LP O Inimitável was released. A transition record in the singer's career, the album had influences in U.S. black music (soul / funk) and scored several hits, like "Se Você Pensa", "Eu Te Amo, Te Amo, Te Amo", "É Meu É Meu É Meu", "As Canções que você Fez Pra Mim" (all partnerships with Erasmo Carlos), "Ciúmes De Você" (Luiz Ayrão), and "Eu Não Vou Deixar Você Tão Só" (Marcos Antonio). Later that year, Roberto Carlos became the first and only Brazilian to win the Festival of San Remo (Italy), with the song "Canzone Per Te", Sergio Endrigo and Sergio Bardotti. The singer would change his style in 1969 and also stopped naming his albums. The album Roberto Carlos was marked by a greater romanticism instead of the traditional themes typical of the Jovem Guarda youth. Among the successes of this LP are "As Curvas da Estrada De Santos", "Sua Estupidez" and "As Flores do Jardim de Nossa Casa", all partnerships with Erasmo Carlos. Later that year, he starred in Roberto Carlos e o Diamante Cor-de-rosa, the second film directed by Roberto Farias and new success at the box office.

=== 1970s and 1980s ===
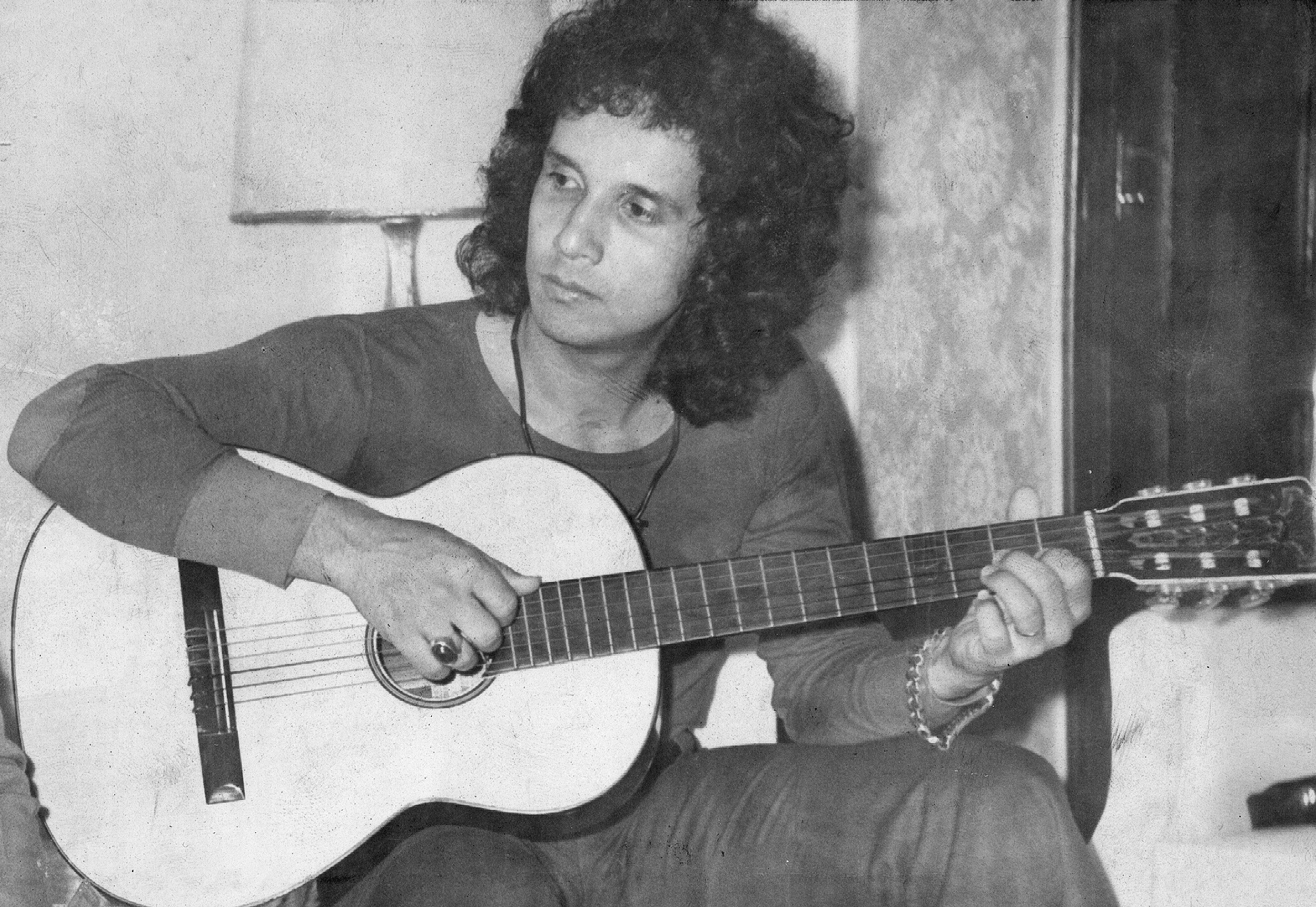
Roberto Carlos, 1972. National Archives of Brazil.

The 1970 decade was marked by the end of the Jovem Guarda and the bolstering the prestige of Roberto Carlos as a romantic artist in Brazil and abroad (USA, Europe and Latin America). The singer became the artist who would sell the most albums in the country. Several of his songs were recorded by other artists such as Julio Iglesias, Caravelli and Ray Conniff. In 1970, the singer made a successful series of shows in Canecão. Later that year, he launched his annual album, which brought such hits as "Ana", "Veste A Roupa Meu Bem" and "Jesus Cristo", a song which also marked his approach to religion.

The following year, Roberto Carlos a 300 km Por Hora, the last movie starring the singer, was released also a great national success. Also in 1971, another album was released, featuring the hits "Detalhes," "Amada Amante", "Todos Estão Surdos", "Debaixo dos Caracóis dos Seus Cabelos" (homage to Caetano Veloso) and "Como Dois E Dois" (Caetano). The 1972 album resonated with "A Montanha", "Como Vai Você", and "Quando As Crianças Saírem de Férias" in addition to being the first LP to reach the milestone of one million copies sold, and in 1973, with "Rotina" and "Proposta". On 24 December 1974, TV Globo aired a special show with singer, which got huge ratings. From that year, the program would be aired at the end of each year. That same year, he released another album, with hits like "O Portão" and "Eu Quero Apenas".

The 1975 album had a hit with "Além do Horizonte" and a remake of his 1965 song "Quero Que Vai Tudo Pro Inferno". The following year the singer would record the new LP in the CBS Studios in New York. The album spawned the songs "Ilegal, Imoral e Engorda" and "Os Seus Botões". In 1977, Roberto Carlos released his annual album, with hits like "Amigo" (an homage to Erasmo Carlos), "Muito Romântico" (Caetano Veloso) and "Cavalgada" and reached #1 on the charts. The following year, another annual album was released, which featured the songs "Café da Manhã", "Força Estranha" (Caetano Veloso) and "Lady Laura" – a song dedicated to his mother. The album sold 1,500,000 copies. In addition to albums that sold more than 1 million copies a year, Roberto Carlos's shows were also popular; in 1978, the singer toured the country for six months, always with packed houses. When Pope John Paul II visited Mexico in 1979, he was greeted with the song "Amigo", sung by a choir of children. The event was broadcast live to hundreds of millions of people worldwide. Roberto also engaged in support of the UN International Year of the Child.

In the early 1980s, he took part in another campaign, this time for the International Year of the Disabled. In 1981, the singer made international tours and recorded the first album in English – others would be released in Spanish, Italian and French. He also recorded the annual album, which featured hits like "Emoções", "Cama e Mesa" and "As Baleias". In 1982, Maria Bethânia participated in the yearly album, the duet "Amiga." It was the first time the singer invited another artist to participate in the recordings on the disc. Roberto Carlos (1982) also had the hit song "Fera Ferida", another collaboration with Erasmo.

After his first decade of success, Roberto Carlos moved towards a more serious, adult-oriented approach to singing, whilst consistently continuing to score hits in his country and throughout Latin America, as well as in Portugal, Spain and Italy. In the 1980s, Roberto Carlos also began recording in English and French (he had already recorded albums in Spanish, Italian, and, naturally, Portuguese). He went on to win the Globo de Cristal trophy, awarded by CBS to Brazilian artists who sell more than five million copies outside Brazil. At the same time, his albums continued to break records in his country. Caminhoneiro (1984) aired 3,000 times in a single day, soon topped by his own Verde e Amarelo (1985), with 3,500 airings. In 1985 he participated in the campaign to help children in Latin America, in the song Cantarê, cantarás, he performed with Julio Iglesias, Gloria Estefan, Jose Feliciano, Plácido Domingo, Cheech Marin and Menudo, among others. He won the 1988 Grammy for Best Latin American Singer and the following year he reached the top of Billboard's Latin charts. Also in 1989, he had a hit with the song "Amazonia". In the traditional year-end special Rede Globo he sang hits like "Outra Vez" alongside Simone.

In 1986, Roberto Carlos performed at Radio City Music Hall in New York and two years later became one of the only Brazilians ever to win a Grammy Award in the category of Best Latin Pop Album with Roberto Carlos / Tolo. In 1998, due to the illness of his wife Maria Rita, Roberto Carlos had to reconcile the disc recording and support for his wife hospitalized in São Paulo. His yearly record, that almost was not released, had only four new songs, including "O Baile da Fazenda", a partnership with Erasmo Carlos and was attended special Dominguinhos. In 1999, the worsening state of health of Maria Rita, followed by her death in December of that year, made the singer failed to make the traditional end of year special on Rede Globo and to record a new album. The record company Sony has just launched The 30 Greatest Hits (Vol. 1 and 2), paired with a collection of greatest hits and a new song, the religious "Todas As Nossas Senhoras", written with Erasmo.

=== 1990s and 2000s ===
Carlos continued to record through the 1990s, focusing on romantic songs. In the mid-1990s a retro-Jovem Guarda wave hit Brazil, and Carlos—who was considered a has-been amongst a younger generation familiar only with his romantic and sentimental hits directed at a middleaged audience—had his importance cited by younger musicians such as Cássia Eller, Adriana Calcanhotto, Chico Science e Nação Zumbi, Barão Vermelho and Skank. Skank also recorded Rei, a tribute to Roberto Carlos with his classic hits from the heyday of the Jovem Guarda epoch.

In 1992 he left his name on the Latin artist Walk of Fame in Miami in the United States. In 1994, Roberto Carlos managed to beat the Beatles' sales in Latin America, selling over 70 million records. In 1996, Roberto Carlos scored another success in partnership with Erasmo Carlos, Mulher de 40, and recorded along with Julio Iglesias, Gloria Estefan, Plácido Domingo, Ricky Martin, Jon Secada among others, the song in Spanish, "Puedes Llegar", the theme of the Atlanta Olympics in the United States. In 1997, he launched the Spanish-language album Canciones Que Amo.

In 1998, Carlos's second wife, Maria Rita, discovered she had cancer (she would die in 1999). After a one-year break, Roberto Carlos returned to recording and performing. In 2001, he broke his contract with Sony (formerly CBS), the recording company through which he had released a vast majority of his albums, due to reasons connected to his wife's death. However, in a 2008 interview, Roberto Carlos stated that he had no intention of retiring from the music industry anytime soon and released an album later that year. In 2004, Carlos was awarded the Latin Grammy Lifetime Achievement Award. He was later recognized as the Latin Recording Academy Person of the Year in 2015.

In December 2006, "Duetos" a CD with 14 tracks and a DVD with 16 numbers was released, which had taken of the special moments recorded for the Globo since the 1970s. Later that year Roberto Carlos won the Latin Grammy for best romantic music album (album Roberto Carlos, 2005). In the same period, the publisher Planeta launched the book Roberto Carlos em Detalhes, by Paulo Cesar de Araujo, an unauthorized biography about the singer, a result of 16 years of research and with testimonies of about 200 people who participated in the career of Roberto. Roberto Carlos repudiated the publication, claiming that there is untruth in it, and announced his intention to withdraw the work from circulation. The court ruled for Roberto Carlos and the book Roberto Carlos em Detalhes was pulled from stores at the end of February 2007. On 27 April 2007, after a long hearing at the Criminal Forum of Barra Funda, São Paulo, all copies of the book were recalled.

In January 2007, the singer travelled to Spain, where he recorded his first album in Spanish in a decade. In June, he performed at Canecão. In addition to special appearances by singers Gilberto Gil, Zeca Pagodinho, and journalists Nelson Motta and Leda Nagle and established actors and actresses, the show's repertoire included the entirety of "É Preciso Saber Viver", a song whose verse "se o bem e o mal existem" (If there are good and evil) the singer had long refused to sing long before, due to obsessive–compulsive disorder (OCD).

Every year, Roberto Carlos hosts a special TV show singing his greatest hits along with special guests. The show has become a tradition in Brazilian television. The house where Carlos was born has also been converted into a museum dedicated to him.

In 2008, Roberto Carlos and Caetano Veloso did a show together in tribute to Antonio Carlos Jobim, which was recorded on CD and DVD "Roberto Carlos, Caetano Veloso and Tom Jobim's music". Jaques Morelenbaum, Daniel Jobim and Wanderlea participated in this show. In 2009, he began a tour celebrating 50 years of his career, and his first concert was on 19 April in Itapemirim, his hometown, the day he turned 68 years old. In April, the show "They sing Roberto – DIVAS", at the Municipal Theater of São Paulo, was attended by the great singers of national music, such Adriana Calcanhotto, Alcione, Ana Carolina, Claudia Leitte, Daniela Mercury, Fafa de Belém, Fernanda Abreu, Ivete Sangalo, Luiza Possi, Marina Lima, Mart'nália, Nana Caymmi, Paula Toller, Rosemary, Sandy, Wanderlea and Zizi Possi. The television host Hebe Camargo and the actress Marilia Pera also participated in the show. Roberto Carlos was considered by the Journal Times one of the 100 most influential Brazilians of 2009.

=== 2010s to present ===
His mother Laura Moreira Braga died on 17 April 2010, at age 96. The news of her death was given minutes after a Roberto Carlos's concert at the Radio City Music Hall in New York City. Through the 2010s, Roberto Carlos continued his yearly cruise ship concert project, "Emoções em Alto Mar" (Emotions in the High Seas). In the second half of 2011, the singer also held a concert in the city of Jerusalem, titled "Emoções em Jerusalem".

Roberto Carlos was paid homage by the Beija-Flor samba school in the 2011 Carnival parade.

In 2013, "Esse Cara Sou Eu" won the Best Brazilian Song and was nominated for Song of the Year at the 2013 Latin Grammy Awards. In 2015, he received the Billboard Latin Music Lifetime Achievement Award and was recognized Person of the Year by the Latin Recording Academy. Roberto Carlos received the Excellence Award at the 2019 Lo Nuestro Awards.

== 50th career anniversary ==
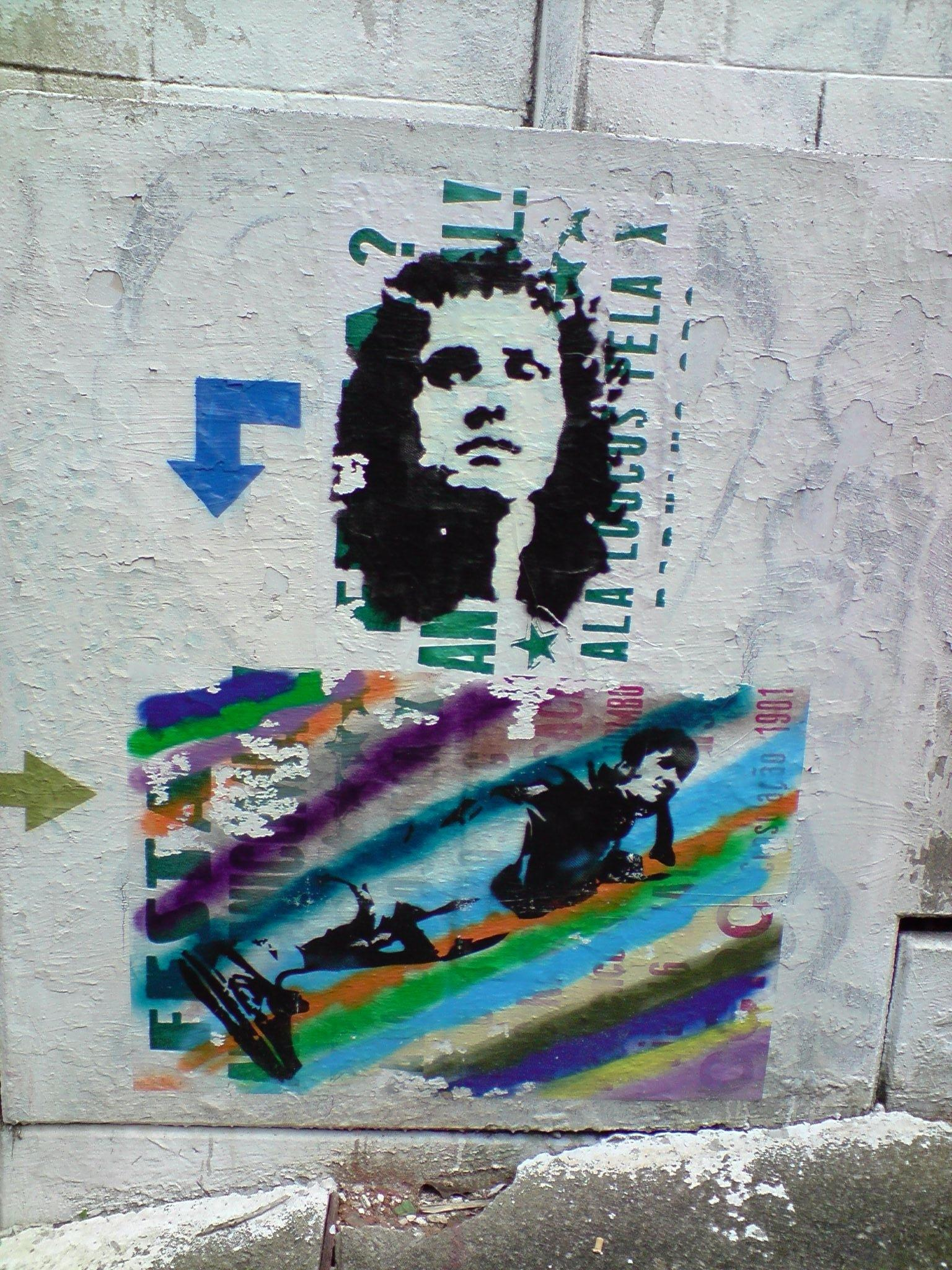
A stenciled graffiti of Roberto Carlos in the streets of São Paulo. It depicts the cover of his self-titled 1972 album.

On 11 July 2009, to celebrate his 50th career anniversary, Roberto Carlos performed a major show at Maracanã Stadium. It was his first presentation in the stadium. The estimated audience was about 70,000 people.

Roberto Carlos's 50th career anniversary was also celebrated with a major exhibition in the Lucas Nogueira Garcez Pavilion, located in Ibirapuera Park, São Paulo. The interactive expo, opened on 4 March 2010, portrayed the singer's life and career. The young poet and composer Gabriel Ataide Lima, says in its influences that Roberto Carlos was one of the largest, and thanks to his music, he realized that "poetry has to be sweet, pure, direct, and lively. Speaking of themes love it ... no grueling things I learned from Roberto Carlos. Besides singing themes like nature, religion and life in peace. "

== Discography ==
Mostly in Portuguese; some songs in Spanish, English and Italian. As the majority of Roberto Carlos's albums are simply self-titled, the most significant hit of each album is also indicated.

- 1961 - Louco Por Você
- 1963 - Splish Splash
- 1964 - É Proibido Fumar
- 1965 - Canta Para a Juventude
- 1965 - Canta a la Juventud
- 1965 - Jovem Guarda
- 1966 - Roberto Carlos ("Eu Te Darei O Céu")
- 1967 - Roberto Carlos em Ritmo de Aventura
- 1968 - O Inimitável
- 1969 - Roberto Carlos ("As Flores do Jardim da Nossa casa")
- 1970 - Roberto Carlos ("Ana")
- 1971 - Roberto Carlos ("Detalhes")
- 1972 - Roberto Carlos ("A Janela")
- 1972 - Un gato en la oscuridad
- 1973 - Roberto Carlos ("A Cigana")
- 1973 - En español ("La distancia")
- 1974 - Roberto Carlos ("Despedida")
- 1974 - El día que me quieras
- 1975 - Roberto Carlos ("Quero Que Va Tudo Pro Inferno")
- 1975 - Quiero verte a mi lado
- 1976 - Roberto Carlos ("Ilegal, Imoral ou Engorda")
- 1976 - San Remo 1968
- 1976 - Tu cuerpo
- 1977 - Roberto Carlos ("Amigo")
- 1977 - En español ("El progreso")
- 1978 - Roberto Carlos ("Fé")
- 1978 - Roberto Carlos ("Amigo (en español)")
- 1979 - Roberto Carlos ("Meu Querido, Meu Velho, Meu Amigo")
- 1979 - Roberto Carlos ("Fé (en español)")
- 1980 - Roberto Carlos ("A guerra dos meninos")
- 1980 - Mi querido, mi viejo, mi amigo
- 1981 - Roberto Carlos ("Ele está prá chegar")
- 1981 - La guerra de los niños
- 1982 - Roberto Carlos ("Amiga")
- 1982 - Roberto Carlos ("Emociones")
- 1983 - Roberto Carlos ("O Amor é a Moda")
- 1983 - Roberto Carlos ("Amiga (en español)")
- 1984 - Roberto Carlos ("Coração")
- 1984 - Roberto Carlos ("El amor y la moda")
- 1985 - Roberto Carlos ("Verde e Amarelo")
- 1985 - Roberto Carlos '85 ("Corazón")
- 1986 - Roberto Carlos ("Apocalipse")
- 1986 - Roberto Carlos '86 ("De corazón a corazón")
- 1987 - Roberto Carlos ("Tô chutando lata")
- 1987 - Nuestro amor
- 1988 - Roberto Carlos ("Se Diverte e Já Não Pensa em Mim")
- 1988 - Ao Vivo (live recording)
- 1988 - Volver
- 1989 - Roberto Carlos ("Amazônia")
- 1989 - Sonrie
- 1990 - Roberto Carlos ("Super herói")
- 1990 - Pajaro herido
- 1991 - Roberto Carlos ("Todas As Manhãs")
- 1991 - Roberto Carlos ("Súper héroe")
- 1992 - Roberto Carlos ("Você É Minha")
- 1993 - Roberto Carlos ("O Velho Caminhoneiro")
- 1993 - Roberto Carlos ("Mujer pequeña")
- 1994 - Roberto Carlos ("Alô")
- 1995 - Roberto Carlos ("Amigo Não Chore Por Ela")
- 1996 - Roberto Carlos ("Mulher de 40")
- 1997 - Canciones Que Amo
- 1998 - Roberto Carlos ("Meu Menino Jesus")
- 1999 - 30 Grandes Sucessos (Greatest Hits)
- 2000 - Mensagens
- 2000 - Amor Sem Limites
- 2000 - Grandes Canciones (2 CD's)
- 2001 - Acústico MTV (MTV Unplugged)
- 2002 - Ao Vivo (Live)
- 2003 - Pra Sempre
- 2004 - Pra Sempre Ao Vivo No Pacaembu (Live)
- 2004 - Mensajes de Fe
- 2005 - Roberto Carlos ("Promessa")
- 2006 - Duetos
- 2008 - En Vivo (Live in Spanish)
- 2008 - Roberto Carlos e Caetano Veloso e a Música de Tom Jobim
- 2009 - Elas Cantam Roberto Carlos
- 2010 - Emoções Sertanejas
- 2011 - Projeto Emoções em Jerusalém (Live)
- 2012 - Esse Cara Sou Eu
- 2013 - Roberto Carlos Remixed
- 2014 - Duetos 2
- 2014 - Ese Tipo Soy Yo
- 2015 - Roberto Carlos em Las Vegas
- 2015 - Primera Fila (Live)
- 2017 - Roberto Carlos ("Chegaste")
- 2018 - Amor Sin Limite

== Billboard charts ==
https://www.billboard.com/artist/roberto-carlos/chart-history/htl/

- Si el Amor Se Va (#1)
- Abre las Ventanas al Amor (#1)
- Si Piensas, Si Quieres (#1)
- Negra (#2)
- Si Me Vas a Olvidar (#2)
- Pajaro Herido (#2)
- Amor Perfecto (#5)
- Se Divierte y Ya No Piensa en Mí (#5)
- De Corazón a Corazón (#7)
- Mujer Pequeña (#8)
- Tengo Que Olvidar (#9)
- Tristes Momentos (#11)
- Mujer (#13)
- Mis Amores (#21)
- Adónde Andarás Paloma (#25)
- Por Ella (#29)
- Contradicciones (#30)
- Símbolo Sexual (#35)

== Filmography ==
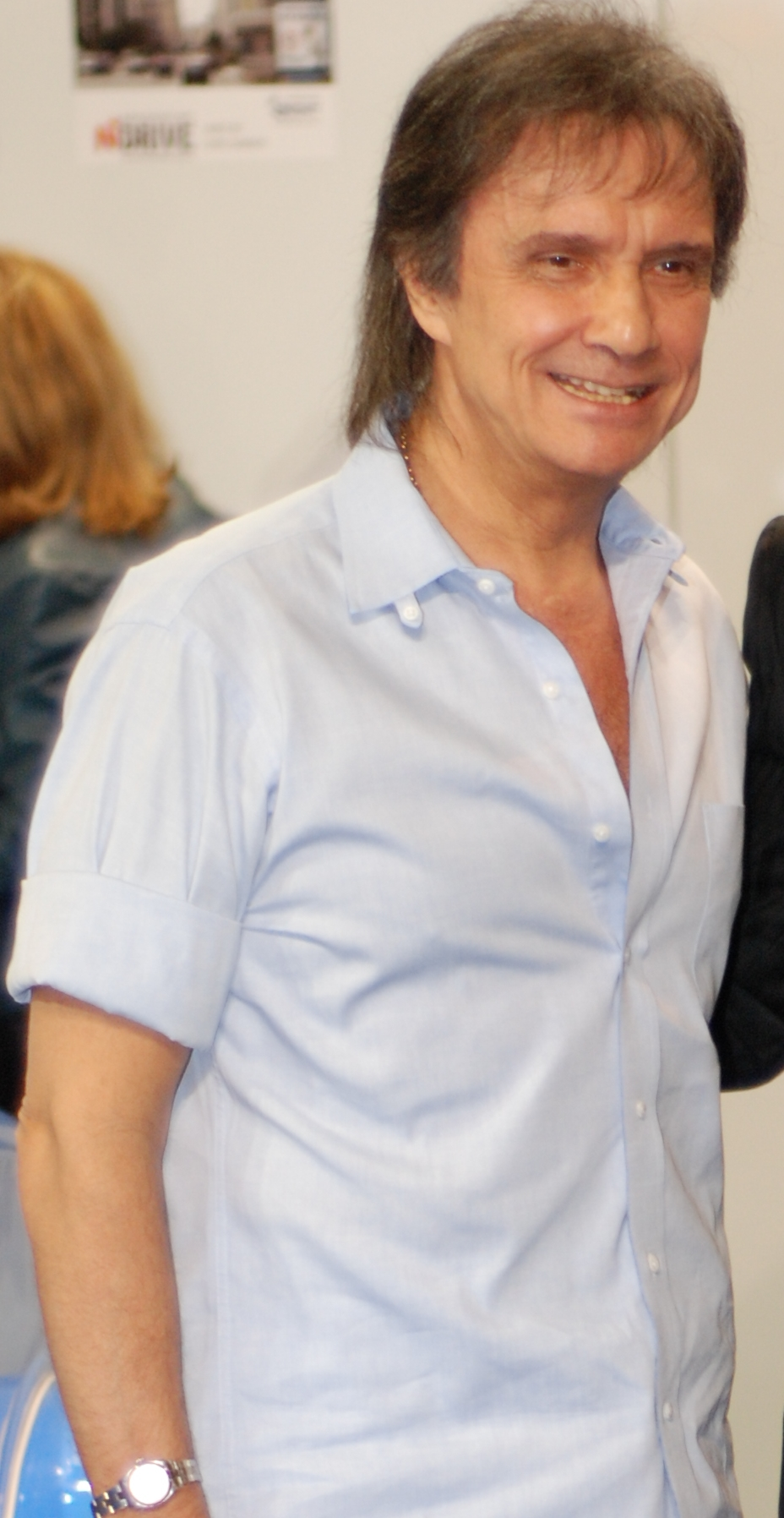
Roberto Carlos

=== Feature films ===
- 1968 – Em Ritmo de Aventura
- 1970 – O Diamante Cor De Rosa
- 1971 – A 300 km Por Hora

=== Live concert films ===
- 2001 – Acústico MTV
- 2001 – Acústico Gold Serie Limitada
- 2004 – Pra Sempre Ao Vivo no Pacaembu
- 2006 – Antologia (CD + DVD)
- 2006 – Duetos
- 2008 – Roberto Carlos ao Vivo (CD + DVD)

== See also ==
- Getúlio Côrtes
- List of best-selling Latin music artists
- List of best-selling music artists

Awards
Latin Grammy Awards
Preceded by Julieta Venegas for "MTV Unplugged"	Latin Grammy Award for Best Long Form Music Video; 2009 for "E A Música de Tom Jobim"; Served alongside: Caetano Veloso	Succeeded by Voz Veis for "Una Noche Común y Sin Corriente"
Preceded by Joan Manuel Serrat	Latin Recording Academy Person of the Year; 2015	Succeeded by Marc Anthony
