= Festa (film) =

- Directed by: Ugo Giorgetti
- Written by: Ugo Giorgetti
- Starring: Antônio Abujamra; Adriano Stuart; Jorge Mautner; Otávio Augusto; Iara Jamra
- Production companies: NDR Filmes; Quanta; Embrafilme; La Luna
- Distributed by: Embrafilme
- Release date: 29 June 1989
- Running time: 87 minutes
- Country: Brazil
- Language: Portuguese

Festa is a 1989 Brazilian comedy-drama film written and directed by Ugo Giorgetti. It stars Antônio Abujamra, Adriano Stuart, and Jorge Mautner, and was produced and distributed by Embrafilme.

== Plot ==
A professional snooker player, his assistant, and a musician are hired for a high-society party in a luxurious mansion. However, they are forbidden by the maître d' from going to the upstairs floor where the party is taking place: the snooker player and his assistant are forced to stay near the snooker table, waiting for any interested guest to play, while the musician can only go upstairs if called. The three wait sitting on a sofa, unable to enjoy the food and drinks served to the guests. Meanwhile, the snooker player's assistant manages to steal a bottle of alcohol, and the three drink in secret while they wait. The housemaid appears, and the three show some interest in the young woman. A famous television actor arrives at the party and passes through the lower floor of the house before joining the guests, causing a commotion among the waiters and staff. Two Italian waiters start a fight and are thrown out of the mansion. The musician, growing impatient, decides to go upstairs without permission and is severely reprimanded by the maître d'. The guests come down to the lower floor, surprising the three hired men who have already been waiting for hours. The host introduces the snooker player to the guests, who soon return to the upper floor. The party is ending, and the three receive their payment from the maître d's hands. Day has already broken, and they prepare to leave. The film was shot entirely on a single set, which was the downstairs floor where the three men waited.

== Cast ==
- Adriano Stuart as snooker player
- Antônio Abujamra as snooker player's assistant
- Jorge Mautner as musician
- Iara Jamra as housemaid
- Otávio Augusto as maître d'
- Ney Latorraca as actor
- José Lewgoy as drunkard
- Patrícia Pillar as snooker player
- Lala Deheinzelin as snooker player
- Pablo Moret as Argentine
- Adolfo Paz Gonzales as waiter
- Péricles Flaviano as waiter
- Marcelo Mansfield as waiter
- Hugo Xavier as waiter
- Ari França as waiter
- Harry Finger as waiter
- Marcos Tadeo Clemente as waiter
- Maurizio de Simone as waiter
- Bruno Lista as waiter
- Grace Giannoukas as actor's secretary
- Jesse James as guard
- Jessica Roberta Canoletti as girl
- Luiz Henrique Romagnoli as bodyguard
- Fernanda Abujamra as drunkard's friend
- Lu Gomes as ice delivery man
- João Galvão as actor's assistant
- Fátima Lima as housemaid
- Teca Pereira as housemaid
- Pedro Paulo Calvoso as homeowner

== Reception ==
According to Inácio Araújo of Folha de S.Paulo, Festa "is perhaps the last great work of the Embrafilme era. Great, though modest. And although it is an anti-party, in reality." He observes in the film that "between the party and the professionals there is a division not only of floors but of class. The film does not view this distance with resentment: like the artists, it seems resigned to the injustices of the world". And he concludes by saying: "With the subordinate place destined, after all, to the artists. To those on stage, of course, but also to the filmmakers. Soon afterwards, in fact, Collor would remove them from the party."

Octavio Caruso, on the website Devo Tudo ao Cinema, said: "A pearl of Brazilian cinema, which won several awards at the Festival de Gramado (film, screenplay, costume design, sound editing, and actor awards for Abujamra and Stuart), deserves to be rediscovered by a new generation."

Eduardo Kaneco, on the website Leitura Fílmica, said: "Essentially, the film Festa could fit into a play. After all, the plot unfolds in a single setting, and the narrative relies on dialogue to build this dramatic comedy with social criticism. However, it is not filmed theatre, as director Ugo Giorgetti skillfully employs cinematic resources to tell the story." The critic highlighted the recurring use of freeze-frame to indicate the passage of time during the long wait of the three protagonists and found it "interesting" how a panoramic shot at the beginning of the film reveals the geography of the set. He praised as "excellent" the performances of Stuart, Abujamra, and Mautner, as well as the secondary roles of Jamra, Lewgoy, and Latorraca.

=== Accolades ===
Year	Awards	Category	Nominee(s)	Result	Ref.
1989	Festival de Gramado	Best Picture	Festa	Won	
1989	Festival de Gramado	Best Screenplay	Ugo Giorgetti	Won	
1989	Festival de Gramado	Best Costume	Nazareth Amaral and Stella de Domênico	Won	
1989	Festival de Gramado	Best Sound Editing	Festa	Won	
1989	Festival de Gramado	Best Actor	Antônio Abujamra and Adriano Stuart	Won	
1989	Rio Cine Festival	Best Director	Ugo Giorgetti	Won	
1989	Rio Cine Festival	Best Editing	Marc de Rossi	Won	
1989	Rio Cine Festival	Best Costume	Nazareth Amaral and Stella de Domênico	Won	
1989	Rio Cine Festival	Best Screenplay	Ugo Giorgetti	Won	
1989	Rio Cine Festival	Best Supporting Actor	Otávio Augusto	Won	
1990	APCA Award	Best Picture	Festa	Won	
1990	APCA Award	Best Actor	Adriano Stuart	Won	
