= Embrafilme =

Brazilian state-owned film production and distribution company

Empresa Brasileira de Filmes S.A.
- Type: State-owned
- Industry: Film
- Founded: September 12, 1969
- Defunct: March 16, 1990
- Fate: Dissolved under the National Privatization Program
- Parent: Government of Brazil

Embrafilme (in full: Empresa Brasileira de Filmes S.A.) was a Brazilian state-owned company established in 1969, operating under the Ministry of Education and Culture with the primary mission of fostering the production and distribution of national films. With a substantial budget, it financed the making of hundreds of films, releasing an average of 25 titles annually and helping usher in a golden age for Brazilian cinema—a period when the country boasted over 3,200 movie theaters. Its work was essential to consolidating Brazil's film industry throughout the 1970s and 1980s.

In the late 1980s, the company began to face strong opposition, being accused of clientelism and poor management, within a broader context of economic crisis and market transformations, such as the popularization of the VCR. These pressures, combined with a campaign for the sector's privatization, culminated in its extinction in March 1990, through the National Privatization Program of the Collor government, without public debate about its future.

Currently, the functions of regulating and promoting Brazilian cinema are carried out mainly by the National Film Agency (Ancine). State incentives for production occur through mechanisms such as the Audiovisual Law and public bidding processes from government agencies. Although there have been subsequent debates, such as at the 2009 National Conference on Communication (Confecom), about the possible recreation of a similar company, the adopted model remains based on the regulatory agency and public-private partnerships.

== History ==
=== Origins and creation ===
The origins of Embrafilme date back to 1937 with the creation of the National Institute of Educational Cinema (INCE) under Getúlio Vargas. Its role evolved until the National Film Institute (INC) was founded in 1966. On September 12, 1969, Embrafilme was officially established by Decree-Law No. 862 as an appendix to the INC, linked to the Ministry of Education and Culture. Its primary objective was to distribute and promote Brazilian films abroad, marking the state's first direct participation in the film production chain beyond just regulation and funding. Emerging during the military dictatorship and the Brazilian economic miracle, it was a mixed-economy company (70% state-owned) intended to foster a nationalistic and independent film industry.

=== Golden age and operations ===
Embrafilme reached its peak in the 1970s. Under director Roberto Farias and with a restructured institutional framework—replacing the INC in March 1976 with the National Film Council (Concine) and the Centrocine foundation—its responsibilities expanded dramatically. It became involved in production, co-production, distribution, exhibition, funding, and professional training. Key policies, like increasing the mandatory exhibition days for national films from 56 to 140 days per year and taxing foreign films to fund national shorts, successfully reserved market share. Brazilian productions came to occupy about a third of the domestic market, with record attendance and box-office successes like Dona Flor and Her Two Husbands and Xica (both 1976). The company made Brazilian cinema prominent internationally through festivals and awards, becoming the largest distributor in Latin America.

=== Decline and extinction ===
The 1980s, Brazil's "lost decade" of economic crisis, triggered Embrafilme's decline. It faced mounting accusations of corruption, clientelism, and favoritism from the press and independent producers. The end of the military dictatorship further tarnished its image, as it was associated with censorship and the regime's nationalist propaganda. Internal administrative difficulties and leadership changes exacerbated the crisis. With the neoliberal policies of President Fernando Collor de Mello, the state's role in culture was dismantled. Embrafilme was abruptly extinguished in March 1990 without public debate, along with the Ministry of Culture (downgraded to a secretariat). The immediate result was a drastic collapse in national film production and theater attendance, as the market was opened to foreign (especially American) cinema. Brazil's film industry only began recovering years later with new incentive laws and the creation of the National Film Agency (Ancine) in 2001, which assumed the regulatory role.

== Selected filmography ==
This list includes films that Embrafilme produced, co-produced, or distributed.

- Bye Bye Brazil
- Lição de Amor
- A Marvada Carne
- A Noiva da Cidade
- Xica da Silva
- Aleluia, Gretchen
- Anjos da Noite
- Mar de Rosas
- Anchieta, José do Brasil
- Lady on the Bus
- Doramundo
- The Age of the Earth
- Gaijin: Roads to Freedom
- O Gigante da América
- Muito Prazer
- Pixote, a Lei do Mais Fraco
- Eles Não Usam Black-tie
- Pra Frente, Brasil
- O Beijo no Asfalto
- The Lady from the Shanghai Cinema
- Twenty Years Later
- Festa
- Abrigo Nuclear
- Cidade Oculta

== See also ==
- Cinema of Brazil
- Rhodesia Television - A Zimbabwean broadcasting company that also closed down in response to change in political direction.
