= Lígia Cortez =

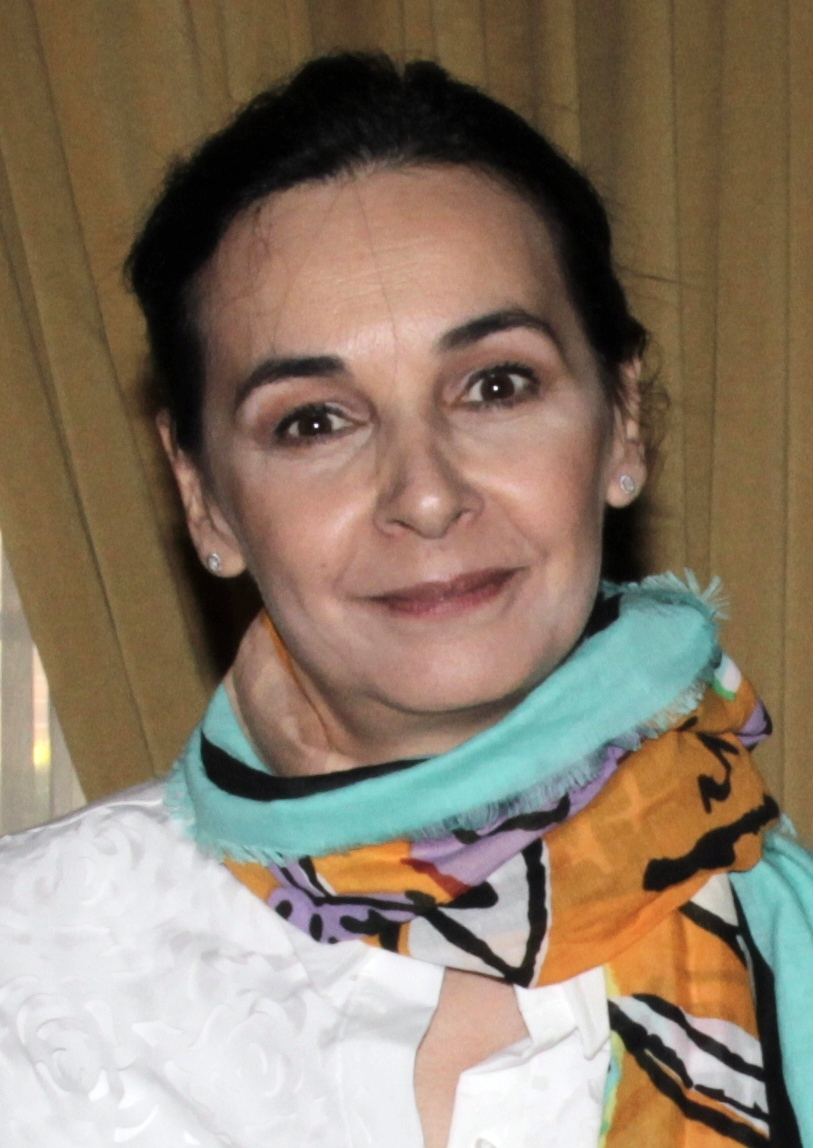
- Occupations: Actress, Theatre Director, Art Education
- Parent(s): Célia Helena, Raul Cortez

Lígia Maria Camargo Silva Cortez (born August 31, 1960, in São Paulo, Brazil) is a Brazilian actress, theatre director, arts educator, and researcher. She is the daughter of actors Célia Helena and Raul Cortez, and the sister of theatre and dance director Elisa Ohtake.

As an actress, she has worked across theatre, cinema, and television with national and international directors such as Robert Wilson (director), Ron Daniels (theatre), José Celso Martinez Corrêa, Antunes Filho, David Leddy, Fauzi Arap, Roberto Lage, Hamilton Vaz Pereira, Flávio Rangel e Sérgio Bianchi. From 1981 to 1984, she was a member of the theatre company Macunaíma, directed by Antunes Filho.

Lígia Cortez has organized educational projects in the arts for marginalized communities in the State of São Paulo. She worked on the implementation of the theatre arm of Associação Arte Despertar (Art Awakening Association) and other social projects such as SOS Aldeia, Favela Paraisópolis and IOP, Fundação Gol de Letra; Projeto Virando o Jogo.

She is the director of Célia Helena Centro de Artes e Educação (Célia Helena Arts and Education Centre) and the founder director of Casa do Teatro.
