= Jardel Filho =

Brazilian actor

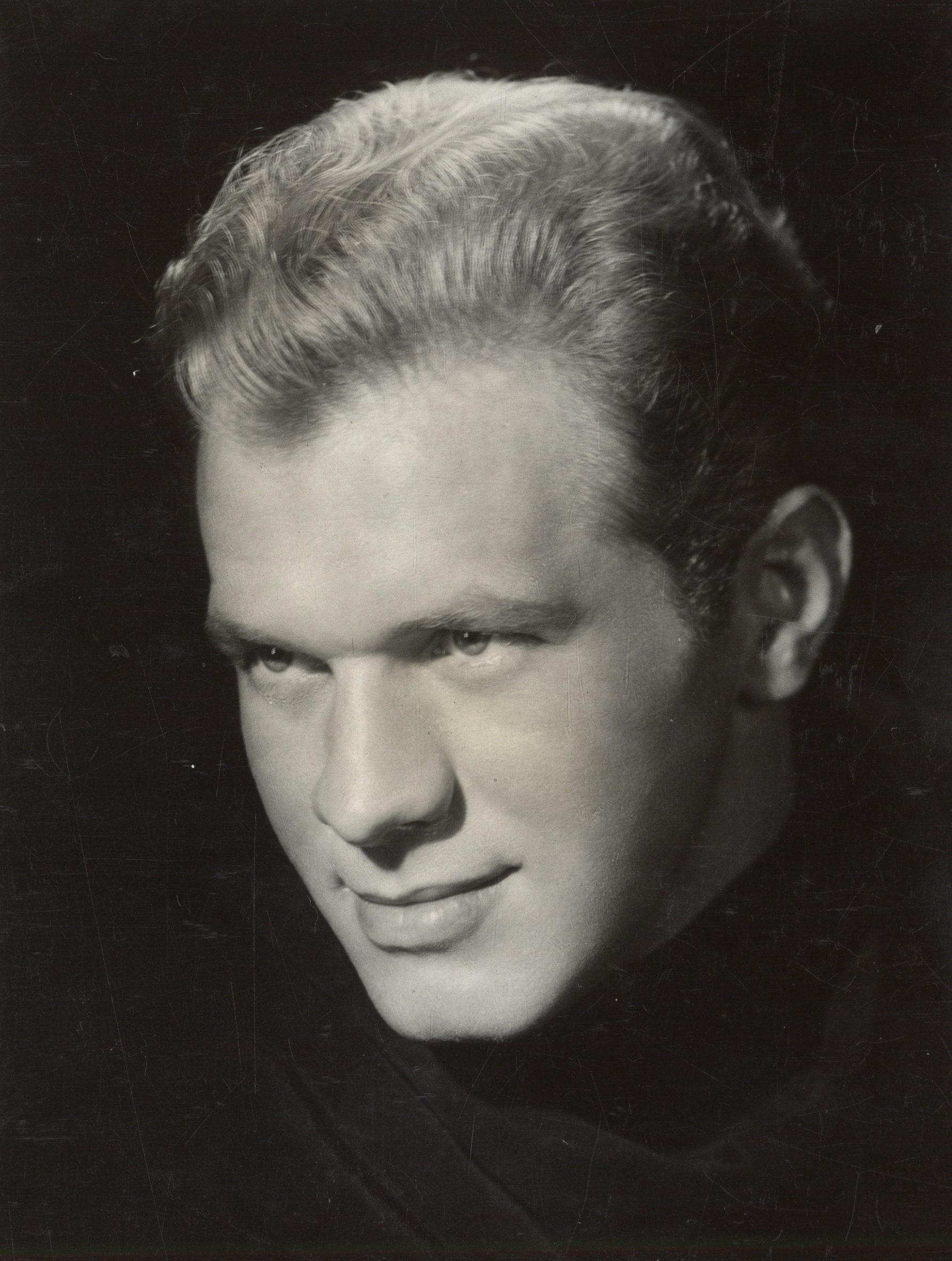
- Born: 24 July 1927; São Paulo, Brazil
- Died: 19 February 1983 (aged 55); Rio de Janeiro, Brazil
- Occupation: Actor
- Years active: 1949–1982

Jardel Filho (24 July 1927 – 19 February 1983) was a Brazilian film and television actor. He appeared in 45 films between 1949 and 1982.

== Filmography ==
Year	Title	Role	Notes
1949	Pra Lá de Boa		
1949	Dominó Negro		
1953	Toda a Vida em Quinze Minutos		
1953	Santa de Um Louco		
1954	Floradas na Serra	Bruno	
1954	Paixão Tempestuosa		
1955	Sonho de Outono		
1955	Leonora of the Seven Seas		
1959	Three Loves in Rio		
1959	Moral em Concordata	Raul	
1960	Cidade Ameaçada		
1960	Plaza Huincul (Pozo Uno)		
1962	Searching for Monica	Juan	
1962	The Female: Seventy Times Seven	Pedro / The Sheepherder	
1962	Carnival of Crime	Paulo	
1962	Esse Rio Que Eu Amo		(segment "Balbino, o Homem do Mar")
1963	Paper Boats		
1963	Racconto	Sergio	
1965	Crônica da Cidade Amada	Paulo	(segment "Iniciada a Peleja")
1965	22-2000 Cidade Aberta		
1965	Paraíba, Vida e Morte de um Bandido		
1967	Entranced Earth	Paulo Martins	
1967	Arrastão		
1968	O Homem Que Comprou o Mundo		
1968	As Três Mulheres de Casanova	Henrique Casanova	
1968	Antes, o Verão	Luiz	
1969	Sete Homens Vivos ou Mortos		
1969	Macunaíma	Venceslau Pietro Pietra	
1971	Os Devassos		
1972	A Viúva Virgem	Constantino	
1972	Roleta Russa		
1972-1973	O Bofe	Dorival	142 episodes
1973	Tercer Mundo		
1973	O Bem-Amado	Juarez Leão	178 episodes
1976	Tangarela, a Tanga de Cristal		
1976	A Menor Violentada	Fred	
1978	Batalha dos Guararapes	Mauricio de Nassau	
1979	O Bom Burguês	Thomas	
1981	Pixote	Sapatos Brancos	
1982	Rio Babilônia	Liberato (Mr.Gold)	
1982	O Segredo da Múmia	Almir Gomes	
1982-1983	Sol de Verão	Heitor	137 episodes
