= Un gato en la oscuridad =

Studio album by Roberto Carlos
- Released: 1972
- Label: CBS

Un gato en la oscuridad ("A cat in the dark") is an album by Brazilian singer Roberto Carlos. It was released in 1972 on the CBS label. In 2015, it was selected by Billboard magazine as one of the "50 Essential Latin Albums of the Last 50 Years".

== Track listing ==
Side A

1. "Un Gato en la Oscuridad"
2. "Amada Amante"
3. "Jesucristo"
4. "Yo Te Amo, Yo Te Amo, Yo Te Amo"
5. "Rosa, Rosita"
6. "Mi Cacharrito"
7. "Una Palabra Amiga"
8. "Nunca Más Te Dejaré Triste Mi Amor"
9. "Ciudad"
10. "La palabra adios"
11. "Detalles"
