= Cidade Ameaçada =

1960 Brazilian crime film

- Theatrical release poster
- Directed by: Roberto Farias
- Written by: Alinor Azevedo; Roberto Farias; Norberto Nath; Roberto Santos
- Produced by: José Antônio Orsini; Paulo Sá Pinto
- Starring: Jardel Filho
- Cinematography: Tony Rabatoni
- Edited by: Maria Guadalupe Landini
- Music by: Gabriel Migliori
- Production companies: Cinematográfica Inconfidência; Unida Filmes
- Distributed by: Sinofilmes
- Release date: 1960
- Running time: 104 minutes
- Country: Brazil
- Language: Portuguese

Cidade Ameaçada is a 1960 Brazilian crime film directed by Roberto Farias. It was submitted into the 1960 Cannes Film Festival. The plot follows the story of a São Paulo criminal known as "Passarinho", which is based on an actual criminal dubbed "Promessinha".

== Cast ==
- Jardel Filho
- Eva Wilma
- Reginaldo Faria
- Pedro Paulo Hatheyer
- Ana Maria Nabuco
- Milton Gonçalves
- Mozael Silveira
- Dionísio Azevedo
- Fregolente
- Doca
- Eugenio Kusnet
- Alberto Prado
- Suzy Arruda
- Fernando Marques
