= Antônio Abujamra =

Brazilian actor and director

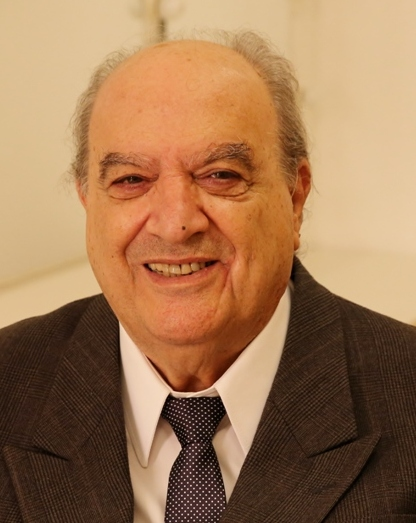
- Antônio Abujamra in 2013
- Born: 15 September 1932; Ourinhos, Brazil
- Died: 28 April 2015 (aged 82); São Paulo, Brazil
- Occupations: Director, actor
- Years active: 1961–2015
- Children: André Abujamra

Antônio Abujamra (Brazilian Portuguese: [ɐ̃ˈtõni.u abuˈʒɐ̃ʁɐ, ɐ̃ˈtõnju -]; 15 September 1932 – 28 April 2015) was a Brazilian theatre and television director and actor. Having majored in journalism and philosophy at the Pontifícia Universidade Católica do Rio Grande do Sul in 1957, he started a career as a theatre critic while he directed and acted in his own plays at the university theatre. Professionally, he made his debut as a theatre director in 1961, and as an actor in 1987, acting in both theatre and television. In 1989, he gained national fame for his role as Ravengar in Rede Globo's telenovela Que Rei Sou Eu?, which became his best known role. In that same year, Abujamra won the Best Actor award at the Gramado Film Festival for his role in the film Festa. From 2000 onward, he was the presenter on TV Cultura's interview program Provocações. His son André Abujamra is a score composer, while his niece Clarisse Abujamra, is also an actress.

== Filmography ==
=== Film ===
Year	Title	Role	Notes
1989	Festa	Snooker Player's Assistant	
1989	Sermões - A História de Antônio Vieira		
1989	Lua Cheia	Veríssimo	
1991	Olímpicos		
1992	Oswaldianas		(segment "Perigo Negro")
1993	Oceano Atlantis		
1995	Carlota Joaquina, Princess of Brazil	Conde de Mata-Porcos	
1996	Quem Matou Pixote?	Advogado	
1996	Olhos de Vampa	Dr. Arthur	
1998	Caminho dos Sonhos		
1999	Terra Nostra	Coutinho Abreu	TV series
2000	Villa-Lobos: A Life of Passion	Director of Theatro Municipal	
2001	Parusia		
2004-2005	Começar de Novo	Dimitri	94 episodes
2005	Quanto Vale Ou É Por Quilo?	Manoel Fernandes	
2005	Concerto Campestre	Major Eleutério	
2006	O Caso Morel		
2009	Poder Paralelo	Marco Iago	
2009	É Proibido Fumar	Pepe	
2009	Solo		
2011	Assalto ao Banco Central	Moacir	
2012	Corações Feridos	Dante Vasconcelos	60 episodes
2012	Brichos – A Floresta é Nossa		
2018	Caminho dos Sonhos	Padre Otero	(final film role)

=== Television ===
Year	Title	Role
1967	As Minas de Prata	Frazão
1988	Sassaricando	António Marcos (Totó)
1989	Que Rei Sou Eu?	Mestre Ravengar
1989	Cortina de Vidro	Arnon Balakian
1992	Amazônia	Homero Spinoza (Xerife Spinoza)
1993	O Mapa da Mina	Nero Horácio Koll
1995	A Idade da Loba	Piconês
1996	Antônio Alves, Taxista	Décio
1997	Os Ossos do Barão	Sebastião Caldas Penteado
1999	Andando nas Nuvens	Álvaro Luís Gomes
1999	Terra Nostra	Coutinho Abreu
1999	Vila Madalena	Federico Fellini
2000	Marcas da Paixão	Coronel, o dono do Cassino
2004	Começar de Novo	Dimitri Nicolaievitch
2009	Poder Paralelo	Marco Iago
2012	Corações Feridos	Dante Vasconcelos

=== Host ===
Year	Title	Role
2000-2015	Provocações	Himself (host)
