= Ancine =

Brazilian regulatory agency for the film and audiovisual art industry

National Film Agency
- Agência Nacional do Cinema (Ancine)

Agency overview
- Formed: September 6, 2001; 25 years ago
- Jurisdiction: Federal government of Brazil
- Agency executive: Alex Braga, Chairperson
- Parent department: Ministry of Culture
- Website: https://www.gov.br/ancine/pt-br

Ancine (Portuguese: Agência Nacional do Cinema or National Film Agency) is a regulatory agency of the federal government of Brazil. Headquartered in Brasília, it promotes, regulates and supervises the Brazilian cinema industry. The agency was created during the presidency of Fernando Henrique Cardoso, on September 6, 2000 (Provisional Measure 2,228-1, later regulated by Law 10,454 on May 13, 2002). It is linked to the Ministry of Culture.

== History ==
Ancine was created to meet a demand expressed at the Third Brazilian Film Congress (CBC), held in Porto Alegre between June 28 and July 1, 2000. One of the CBC's resolutions was to support the creation, within the scope of the Federal Government, of a management body for cinematographic activity, replacing Embrafilme, which was dissolved on March 16, 1990. The managing body was then created, as a regulatory agency, on September 6, 2001.

During the first presidency of Lula da Silva, there were discussions to expand the powers of the agency, which would be renamed the National Film and Audiovisual Agency (Agência Nacional do Cinema e do Audiovisual; Ancinav) and also regulate the television market. However, the project suffered strong criticism, mainly from broadcasting companies, and ended up being abandoned.
