= Raul Cortez =

Brazilian actor (1932–2006)

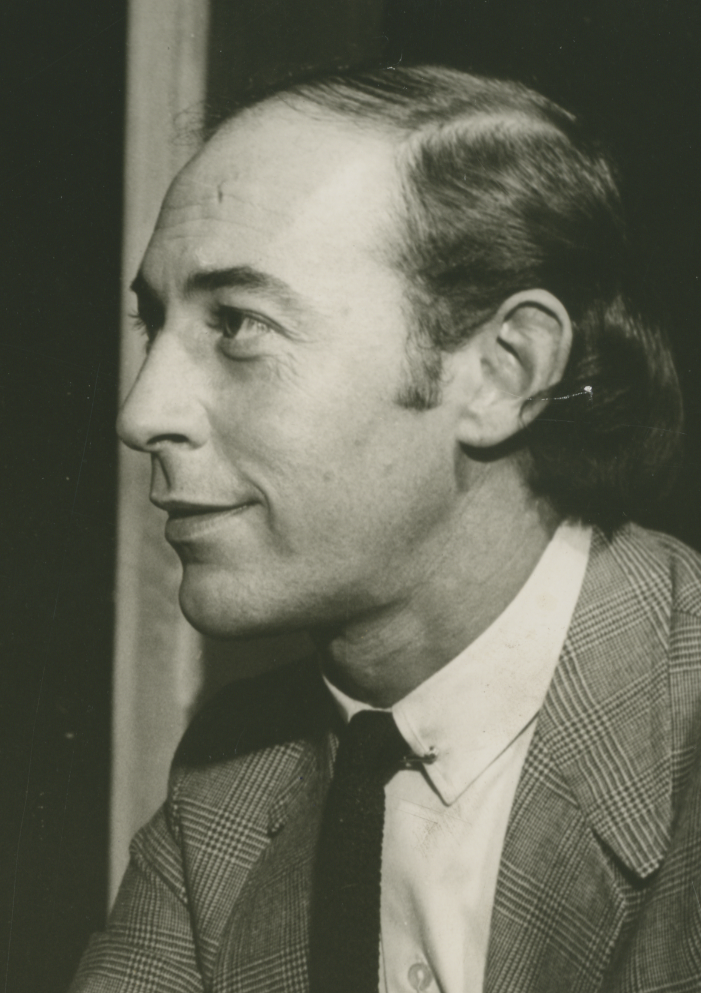
- Cortez in 1967
- Born: 28 August 1932; São Paulo, Brazil
- Died: 18 July 2006 (aged 73); São Paulo, Brazil
- Occupation: Actor
- Years active: 1954–2006
- Spouses: Célia Helena (divorced) Tânia Caldas (divorced)
- Children: 2, including Lígia

Raul Christiano Machado Cortez (Brazilian Portuguese: [ʁaˈuw koʁˈte(j)s]; 28 August 1932 – 18 July 2006) was a Brazilian stage, television, and film actor, director and producer. Cortez died of pancreatic cancer in 2006, aged 73.

== Filmography ==
- O Pão Que o Diabo Amassou (1957)
- The Obsessed of Catule (1965) - Joaquim
- Cristo de Lama (1966)
- Case of the Naves Brothers (1967) - Joaquim Naves
- O Anjo Assassino (1967) - Victor
- O Homem Que Comprou o Mundo (1968)
- Desesperato (1968)
- Capitu (1969) - Escobar
- Brazil Year 2000 (1969) - Man who protests
- Tempo de Violência (1969)
- Toninho on the Rocks (1970, TV Series)
- Beto Rockfeller (1970)
- A Arte de Amar Bem (1970) - Ronaldo (segment "A Inconfidência de Ser Esposa")
- Roberto Carlos a 300 Quilômetros por Hora (1971) - Rodolfo
- A Infidelidade ao Alcance de Todos (1972) - (segment "Tuba, A")
- Vitória Bonelli (1972, TV Series) - Jaime Bonelli
- Janaina - A Virgem Proibida (1972) - Raul
- A Volta de Beto Rockfeller (1973, TV Series) - Aluisio
- Xeque-Mate (1976, TV Series) - Sebastião
- Tchan! A Grande Sacada (1976-1977, TV Series) - Aquilino Matos Madeira
- O Seminarista (1977)
- Pecado Sem Nome (1978)
- Os Trombadinhas (1980) - Juiz
- Água Viva (1980, TV Series) - Miguel Fragonard
- Baila Comigo (1981, TV Series) - Joaquim 'Quim' Gama
- Jogo da Vida (1981, TV Series) - Carlito Madureira
- Tensão no Rio (1982)
- Amor de Perversão (1982)
- Moinhos de Vento (1983, TV Mini-Series) - Ronaldo
- Partido Alto (1984, TV Series) - Célio Cruz
- Sabor de Mel (1985 TV Series)
- Vera (1986) - Professor Paulo
- Mandala (1987, TV Series) - Pedro Bergman
- Os Trapalhões no Auto da Compadecida (1987) - Major
- Brega & Chique (1987, TV Series) - Herbert Alvaray / Cláudio Serra / Mário Francis
- Jardim de Alah (1988)
- Rainha da Sucata (1990, TV Series) - Jonas
- A Grande Arte (1991) - Thales de Lima Prado
- Você Decide (1992, TV Series)
- As Noivas de Copacabana (1992, TV Mini-Series) - José Carlos Montese
- Mulheres de Areia (1993, TV Series) - Virgílio Assunção
- Um Céu de Estrelas (1996)
- O Rei do Gado (1996-1997, TV Series) - Jeremias Berdinazi Eco
- Terra Nostra (1999-2000, TV Series) - Francesco Magliano
- To the Left of the Father (2001) - Yohana / Father
- Os Maias (2001, TV Mini-Series) - Narrator (voice)
- Esperança (2002, TV Series) - Genaro
- As Filhas da Mãe (2001-2002, TV Series) - Arthur Brandão
- The Other Side of the Street (2004) - Camargo
- Senhora do Destino (2004, TV Series) - Pedro
- JK (2006, TV Mini-Series) - Antônio Carlos Andrada
- Garoto Cósmico (2007) - Giramundos (voice) (final film role)
