= Pra Quem Fica, Tchau =

1971 film

- Film poster
- Directed by: Reginaldo Faria
- Written by: Reginaldo Faria
- Produced by: Reginaldo Faria; Roberto Farias
- Starring: Reginaldo Faria
- Cinematography: José Medeiros
- Release date: 1971
- Running time: 90 minutes
- Country: Brazil
- Language: Portuguese

Pra Quem Fica, Tchau (transl. "For those who stay, bye bye") is a 1971 Brazilian comedy film written and directed by and starring Reginaldo Faria. The film was selected as the Brazilian entry for the Best Foreign Language Film at the 44th Academy Awards, but was not accepted as a nominee.

== Cast ==
- Reginaldo Faria as Didi
- Stepan Nercessian as Lui
- Rosana Tapajós as Maria
- Flávio Migliaccio as Chuca
- José Lewgoy as Tio Gustavo
- Jorge Cherques as Marido de Maria
- Irma Álvarez as Mulher do jeep
- Tânia Scher as Mulher do conversível
- Hugo Bidet as Teleco
- Gracinda Freire as Tia Lourdes
- Wilza Carla as Dalva
- Henriqueta Brieba as Mãe de Maria

== See also ==
- List of submissions to the 44th Academy Awards for Best Foreign Language Film
- List of Brazilian submissions for the Academy Award for Best Foreign Language Film
