= O Carteiro =

2011 film directed by Reginaldo Faria

- Theatrical release poster
- Directed by: Reginaldo Faria
- Written by: Reginaldo Faria
- Produced by: Beto Turquenitch; Gisele Yarochewsky
- Starring: Cande Faria; Ana Carolina Machado; Dany Stenzel; Felipe de Paula; José Vitor Castiel; Ingra Liberato
- Cinematography: Roberto Henkin
- Edited by: Mauris Hansen
- Music by: Ricardo Leão
- Production company: TGD filmes
- Release date: 11 August 2011 (Brazil)
- Running time: 103 minutes
- Country: Brazil
- Language: Portuguese

O Carteiro is a 2011 Brazilian drama film written and directed by Reginaldo Faria.

== Plot ==
Victor (Campos Faria) is a postman in the countryside of Rio Grande do Sul and has a habit of violating the correspondence of its residents. One day, to his surprise, he falls into his own trap and falls in love with a new resident of the city, the young Merli (Ana Carolina Machado), who exchanges letters with her boyfriend. Victor begins to track the correspondence between them and stops interfering in the relationship of the couple.
