= Pra Frente, Brasil =

1982 film directed by Roberto Farias

- Theatrical release poster
- Directed by: Roberto Farias
- Written by: Roberto Farias
- Based on: Sala Escura by: Reginaldo Faria; Paulo Mendonça
- Produced by: Roberto Farias
- Starring: Reginaldo Faria; Antônio Fagundes; Natália do Valle; Elizabeth Savalla
- Cinematography: Dib Lutfi
- Edited by: Mauro Farias; Roberto Farias
- Music by: Egberto Gismonti
- Production companies: Embrafilme; Produções Cinematográficas R.F. Farias Ltda.
- Distributed by: Embrafilme
- Release dates: March 1982 (Gramado Film Festival); 14 February 1983
- Running time: 105 minutes
- Country: Brazil
- Language: Portuguese

Pra Frente, Brasil (English: Go Ahead, Brazil!) is a 1982 Brazilian drama film directed, written and produced by Roberto Farias. It tells the fictional story of a man mistakenly arrested by a group linked to the military dictatorship during the 1970 FIFA World Cup.

== Plot ==
The film is set in mid 1970, when the military regime's "economic miracle" and the victory of the Brazil national football team on the FIFA World Cup serves as a distraction for the persecution of opposition leaders by the political police of the dictatorship.

Under this context, Jofre Godoi da Fonseca, an alienated middle class man, is mistaken for Sarmento, a political activist he met at an airport prior to his assassination. He is then arrested and brutally tortured by a paramilitary group of vigilantes sponsored by influential businessmen to hunt down people deemed "subversive" by the regime.

Jofre's wife Marta and his brother Miguel join forces to investigate his disappearance. After they fail to get enough support from law enforcement agents, Mariana, leader of a left-wing resistance group and Miguel's former girlfriend, helps them. Their efforts proved to be useless after Jofre is killed on a failed escape attempt.

== Cast ==
- Reginaldo Faria as Jofre Godoi
- Antônio Fagundes as Miguel Godoi
- Natália do Vale as Marta Godoi
- Elizabeth Savalla as Mariana
- Carlos Zara as Dr. Barreto
- Cláudio Marzo as Sarmento

== Awards and nominations ==
33rd Berlin International Film Festival

- Golden Bear – Roberto Farias (nominated)
- C.I.C.A.E. Award – Roberto Farias (won)
- OCIC Award – Roberto Farias (won)

10th Gramado Film Festival

- Best Film – Roberto Farias (won)
- Best Editing – Roberto Farias, Maurício Farias (won)

17th Silver Daisy Awards

- Best Feature Film – Roberto Farias (won)

9th Festival de Cine Iberoamericano de Huelva

- Critic's Choice Award
