= Wanderléa =

Brazilian singer (born 1944)

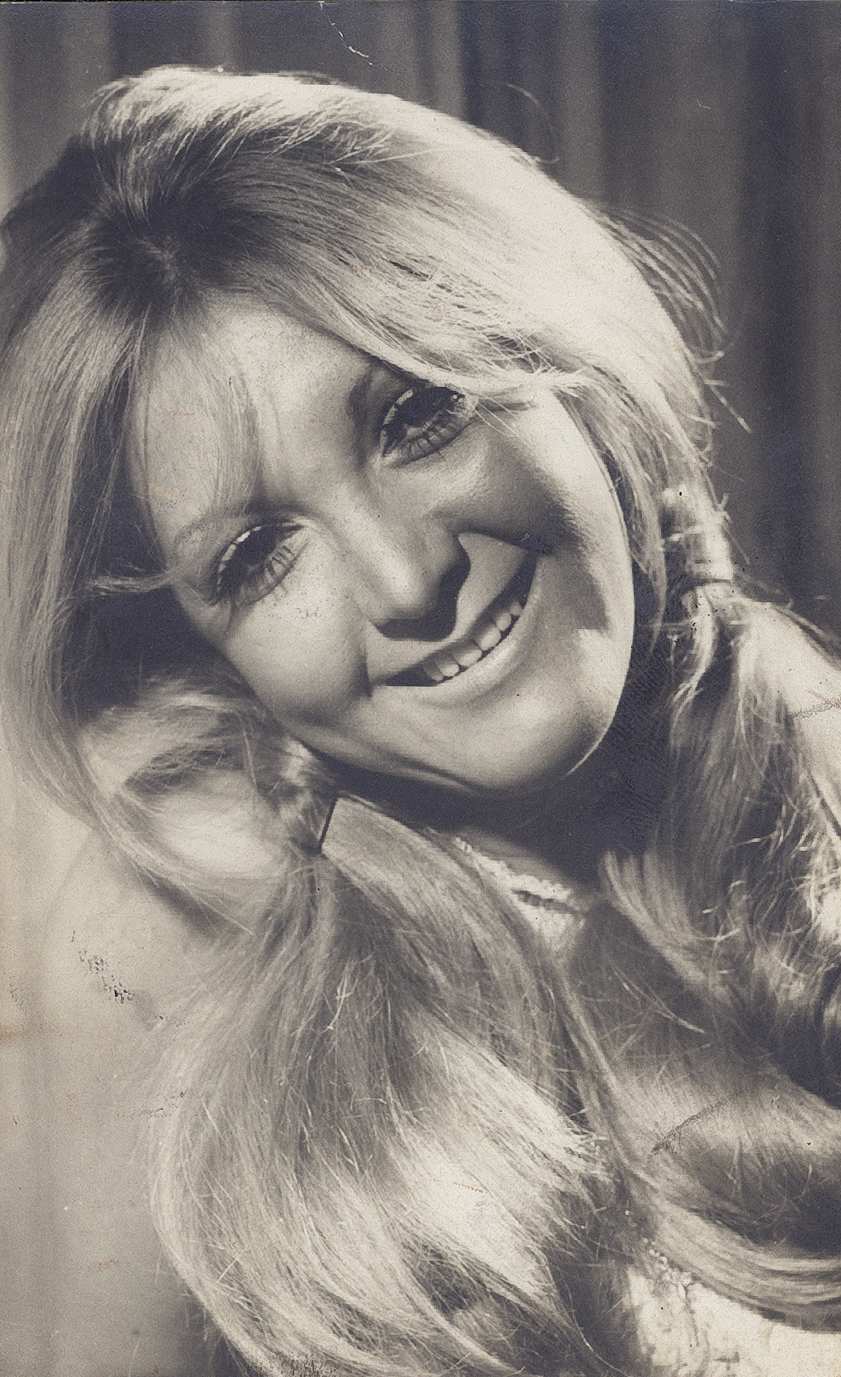
- Wanderléa in 1965.

Background information
- Born: Wanderléa Charlup Boere Salim; June 5, 1944 (age 82); Governador Valadares, Minas Gerais, Brazil
- Genre: Rock and Roll Pop
- Occupation: Singer
- Years active: since 1958
- Labels: Copacabana, CBS

Wanderléa Charlup Boere Salim (born June 5, 1944 in Governador Valadares, Minas Gerais) is a Brazilian singer and former co-host of the historic television show Jovem Guarda alongside Roberto Carlos and Erasmo Carlos. The show aired on TV Record between 1965 and 1968. Wanderléa was nicknamed Ternurinha (roughly "little darling") after her first hit "Ternura" ("Somehow it got to be tomorrow").

== Biography ==
Wanderléa was born on June 5, 1944, in Governador Valadares, Minas Gerais, Brazil to Lebanese immigrant parents. After her birth, the family moved to the city of Lavras, also in Minas Gerais. In 1955, they moved to the Ilha do Governador neighborhood in Rio de Janeiro.

She became known in the late 1950s singing on radio. In the early 1960s she made her first phonographic recordings of rock and roll, and impressed by the way she sang.

In 1965, she was invited to present a television show together with singers Roberto Carlos and Erasmo Carlos, the famous Jovem Guarda show, which soon became the first youth movement in Brazil, influenced by the Beatles. Wanderléa was responsible for influencing fashion among girls from the 1960s in Brazil, becoming the first pop star in the country.

== Personal life ==
Wanderléa suffered many losses in her life. The first of these was when she was ten years old, when her older sister was killed by a stray bullet. This fact forever shook the life of Wanderléa and her entire family.

At the beginning of her career, at age sixteen, she started dating Zé Renato, the son of Chacrinha. In a few months of dating they became engaged. After seven years together, there was a tragedy; Zé had an accident and was paralyzed. Wanderléa went into serious depression and over time the relationship went into crisis because he didn't want to be a burden in her life. Despite having fought for him, she respected Zé's decision and separated from her fiancé.

After the separation, she dated some singers and songwriters at the time. She also had a short relationship with Roberto Carlos. Then she met Chilean guitarist Lalo Correia, better known as Lalo California. The two started dating and soon got married. In 1982, the couple's first child, Leonardo, was born. Leonardo drowned in 1984, at the age of two. The boy was riding a tricycle and accidentally fell into a pool. He was rescued but did not survive. They two had two more daughters, Yasmin and Jadde. The two are less than two years apart and were born in the late 1980s.

She went through other losses, such as the death of her father, which left her very shaken. In 1996, shortly after her father’s death, her brother died of HIV/AIDS, which made her fall into depression. This shook her emotionally to the point that, according to her, it caused her uterine cancer, for which she required a hysterectomy. But she managed to regain her health and spirit, and in her own words, "if a problem arises I say: 'Let's see how we can solve it', and carry on."

She is still married to Lalo, but the two live in separate houses, and the singer says she is very happy like that, as she realized that living together they didn't get along so well. Because the couple likes a freer relationship, they live together like partners.

She revealed in interviews that she was bothered by her fame, which brought her problems with time; for example, when passing in the street with their imported cars, humble people pointed her out in the streets, commenting, "Here goes Wanderléa with her big car.” This annoyed her and said that she was once very poor and understands the suffering of the humble, but no one recognized that. Since the days of the Jovem Guarda, she has had the nickname Ternurinha, which at the beginning she didn't like very much. She even thought of launching a campaign to change it. But then she got used to it and ended up accepting it. Another nickname she also received at the time of the Jovem Guarda was Wandeca.

== Discography ==
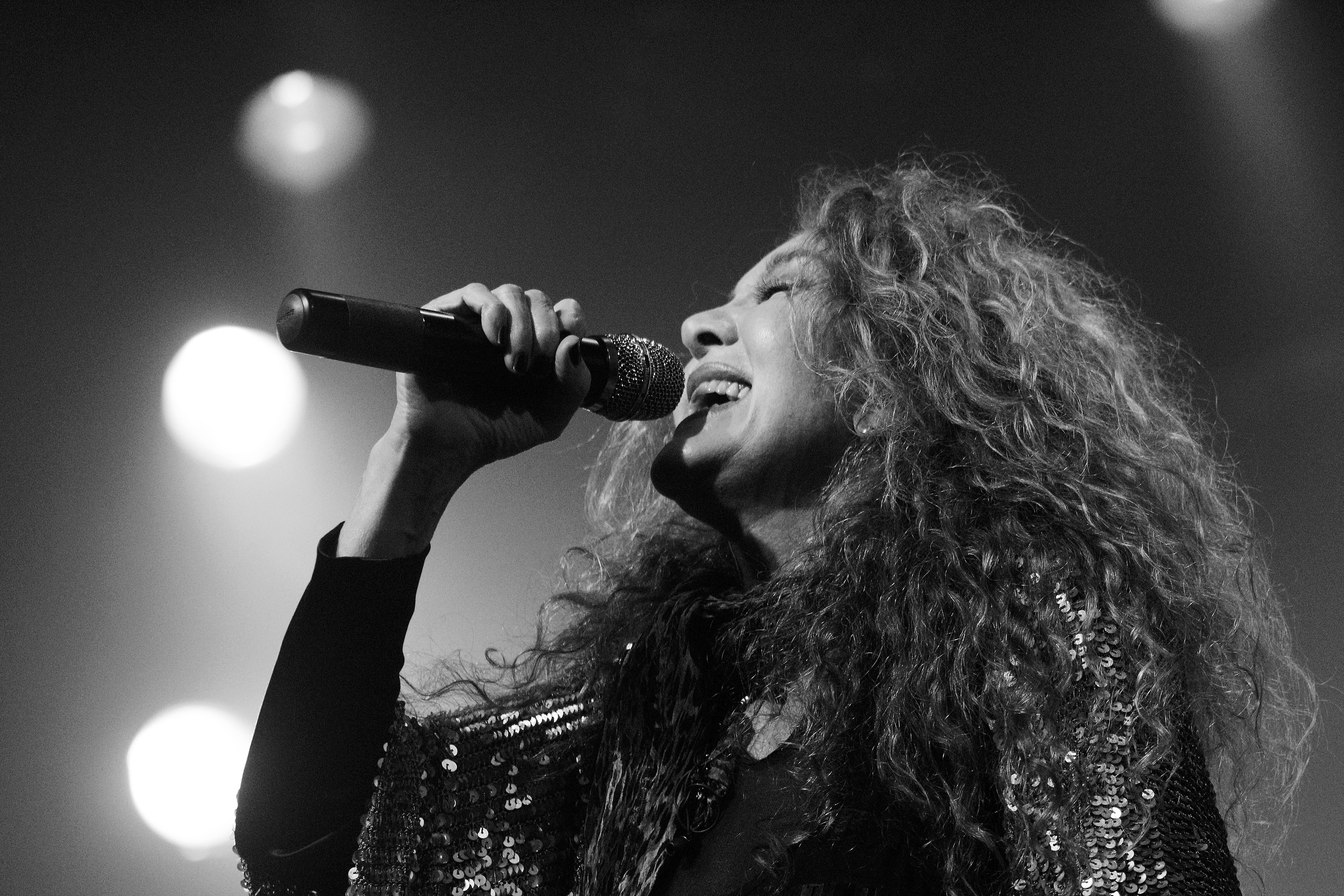
Wanderléa in 2016.

=== Studio albums ===
- 1963 - Wanderléa (CBS)
- 1964 - Quero Você (CBS)
- 1965 - É Tempo de Amor (CBS)
- 1966 - A Ternura de Wanderléa (CBS)
- 1967 - Wanderléa (CBS)
- 1968 - Pra Ganhar Meu Coração (CBS)
- 1972 - Maravilhosa (Polydor)
- 1975 - Feito Gente (Polydor)
- 1977 - Vamos Que eu Já Vou (EMI)
- 1978 - Mais que Paixão (EMI)
- 1980 - Wanderléa (CBS)
- 1981 - Ser Estranho (CBS)
- 1982 - Wanderléa (CBS)
- 1985 - Menino Bonito (Som Livre)
- 1989 - Wanderléa (3M)
- 1992 - Te Amo (Som Livre)
- 1996 - O Novo de Novo - Ao Vivo (Paradoxx)
- 2003 - O Amor Sobreviverá (BMG)
- 2008 - Nova Estação (Lua Music)
- 2016 - Vida de Artista

=== Compilation Albums ===
- 2000 - 21 Grandes Sucessos de Wanderléa (Columbia)

== Filmography ==
- 1968 - Juventude e Ternura
- 1969 - Agnaldo, Perigo a Vista
- 1969 - Roberto Carlos e o Diamante Cor-de-rosa
- 1971 - Roberto carlos a 300 Km Por Hora
- 2008 - Nova Estação (DVD)
- 2015 - Jovem aos 50 - A História de Mio Século da Jovem Guarda

== See also ==
- Jovem Guarda
- Roberto Carlos
- Erasmo Carlos
