= Roberto Farias =

Brazilian film director (1932–2018)

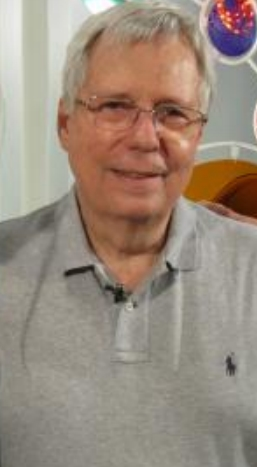
- Born: 27 March 1932; Nova Friburgo, Rio de Janeiro, Brazil
- Died: 14 May 2018 (aged 86)
- Occupations: Film director, film producer, screenwriter
- Years active: 1957-2018

Roberto Farias (27 March 1932 – 14 May 2018) was a Brazilian film director, producer and screenwriter. He directed 15 films during his career. His 1982 film Pra Frente, Brasil was entered into the 33rd Berlin International Film Festival. Farias' brother Reginaldo Faria (the 's' was added to his surname due to an error at the registry) is also a film director and actor.

== Biography ==
Brother of the actor Reginaldo Faria, had an "s" added to his surname by error of the notary. His mother took him as a baby when he went to the movies. Between one bottle and another, it was his first contact with what was happening on the screen. At the age of 8 he was making a "movie" at his house using shoe boxes. From cinema to photography was an easy jump and he came from Nova Friburgo to study Fine Arts in Rio de Janeiro or to do Architecture, but his destiny and preference was always the movies. Throughout his career, Roberto was an assistant, editor, screenwriter, producer and distributor, but he was never an actor.

The beginning was in Atlântida Cinematográfica where he was taken by Watson Macedo to be assistant of direction. The debut was in the drama Maior que o Ódio, directed by Jose Carlos Burle. He made almost ten films as a director or production assistant until he made his debut as a director in 1957 with "Rico Ri à Toa", a starring Zé Trindade in who besides directing, also was the author of the script and the dialogues.

In 1960, with Cidade Ameaçada, he won several awards and became one of the most respected filmmakers in Brazil, a position he would consolidate with Assalto ao Trem Pagador, in 1962.

In the 1960s he founded the R.F.Farias production company, one of the most important in the country. He became a popular director when filming the film trilogy with Roberto Carlos, which began in 1968 with "Roberto Carlos em Ritmo de Aventura" and ended in 1971 with "Roberto Carlos a 300 Quilômetros por Hora".

Roberto was also president of the Sindicato Nacional da Indústria Cinematográfica and the first filmmaker to direct Embrafilme. In TV Globo made, in 1965, Câmara Indiscreta; later directed the miniseries A Máfia no Brasil, As Noivas de Copacabana, Contos de Verão and Maria Moura Memorial; besides the programs "Você Decide", Brava Gente (1996), Sob Nova Direção and Faça a Sua História.

Roberto Farias died in Rio de Janeiro on 14 May 2018, at age 86, during an inpatient treatment for cancer.

== Selected filmography ==
=== Films ===
- 1957 - Rico Ri à Toa
- 1958 - No Mundo da Lua
- 1960 - Cidade Ameaçada
- 1961 - Um Candango na Belacap
- 1962 - Assalto ao Trem Pagador
- 1963 - Selva Trágica
- 1966 - Toda Donzela Tem um Pai que É uma Fera
- 1968 - Roberto Carlos em Ritmo de Aventura
- 1970 - Roberto Carlos e o Diamante Cor-de-Rosa
- 1971 - Roberto Carlos a 300 Quilômetros por Hora
- 1971 - Pra Quem Fica, Tchau
- 1973 - O Fabuloso Fittipaldi (documentary)
- 1982 - Pra Frente, Brasil
- 1986 - Os Trapalhões no Auto da Compadecida

=== Television ===
- 1984 - A Máfia no Brasil
- 1992 - As Noivas de Copacabana
- 1993 - Contos de Verão
- 1993 - Menino do Engenho
- 1994 - Memorial de Maria Moura
- 1995 - Decadência

== Awards ==
- Tribute to the director and actor Roberto Farias at the VI International Film Festival in Funchal, 2011.
- Award Kikito for best film in the Festival de Gramado by Pra Frente, Brasil in 1982.
- Award Kikito for best editing at the Festival de Gramado by Pra Frente, Brasil, in 1982.
- Award of the International Catholic Office in the Berlin Festival by Pra Frente, Brasil, in 1982.
- C.I.C.A.E. of best film, in the Festival of Berlin by Pra Frente, Brasil.
- Critics' Award at the Ibero-American Festival of Huelva, by Pra Frente, Brasil.
- Alex Vianny Cine Center Award for Forward, Brazil, in 1982.
- Best Film Award at the Festival of Goiânia for Toda donzela tem um pai que é uma fera, in 1966.
- Award for Best Film at the Senegal Black Art Festival, for Assalto ao trem pagador, 1962.
- Award for best film at the Festival of Bahia for Assalto ao trem pagador, in 1962.
- Saci Award for the best script, conferred by the newspaper Estado de São Paulo, for "Assalto ao trem pagador" in 1962.
- Human Values Prize at the Second Festival of Cinematographic Art of Lisbon, for Assalto ao trem pagador, in 1962.
- Best Film and Best Director Award at the Marília Film Festival, for Cidade ameaçada, in 1960.
- Tribunascope Award and Best Governor of the State of São Paulo Award for "Cidade ameaçada", in 1960.
- Governor of the State of São Paulo Award for Best Director, for Cidade ameaçada, in 1960.
- Tribute to the 14th Brazilian Cinema Grand Award in 2015.
