= Ugo Giorgetti =

Brazilian filmmaker (born 1942)

Ugo César Giorgetti (born 1942 in São Paulo) is a Brazilian filmmaker.

== Early years ==
He works as scriptwriter and director of advertising films since 1966, initially at the Alcântara Machado, C & N, Denison and Proeme agencies, later for the companies Cia. de Cinema, Frame and Espiral.

In the early 1970s he made two short films about aspects of the city of São Paulo. His first feature, Quebrando a Cara, started in 1977 but released only in 1986, is a 16 mm documentary about the career and fights of boxer Éder Jofre.

== Feature films ==
Giorgetti's first feature film, "Jogo Duro," tells the story of a group of marginalized people who dispute the occupation of a house in an upscale neighborhood of São Paulo. His next film "Festa" received the award for Best Film at the 1989 Gramado Festival. In 2004, the Aplauso Cinema Brasil Collection, from the Official Press of the State of São Paulo, published the volume "Ugo Giorgetti - o sonho intacto", by Rosane Pavam.

== Football writer ==
Since 2006, Giorgetti has signed a weekly column on football in the Sunday edition of the newspaper O Estado de S. Paulo.

== Filmography ==
- 1976: Rua São Bento, 405, Prédio Martinelli (curta)
- 1976: Campos Elísios (curta)
- 1985: Jogo duro
- 1986: Quebrando a Cara (documentário)
- 1989: Festa
- 1995: Sábado
- 1998: Boleiros - Era uma vez o futebol
- 2000: Uma Outra Cidade (documentário)
- 2002: O Príncipe
- 2004: Boleiros 2 - Vencedores e vencidos
- 2010: Solo
- 2012: Cara ou Coroa
- 2015: Uma Noite em Sampa
