= José Lewgoy =

Brazilian actor (1920–2003)

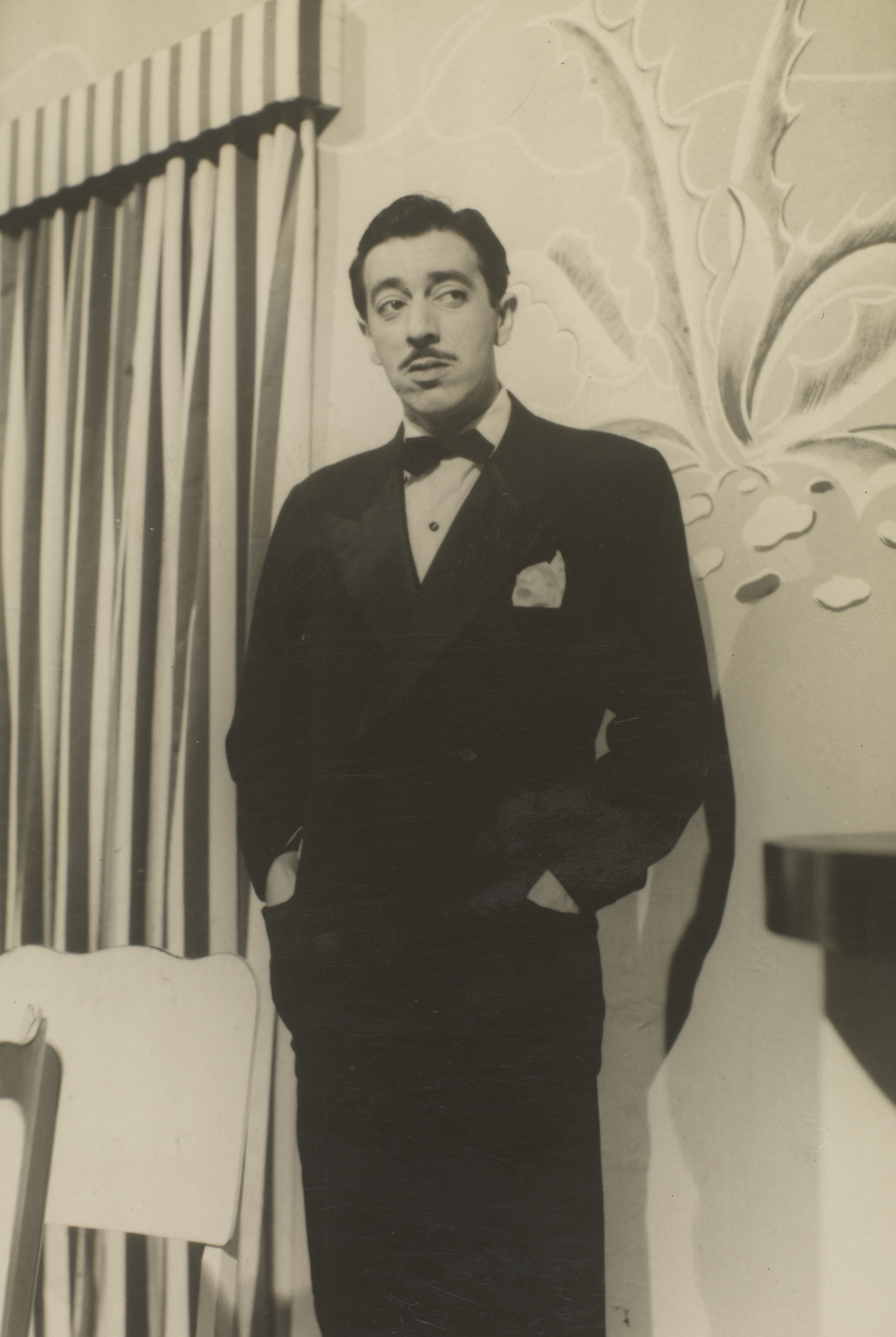
- Lewgoy in 1952
- Born: 16 November 1920; Veranópolis, Rio Grande do Sul, Brazil
- Died: 10 February 2003 (aged 82); Rio de Janeiro, Brazil
- Occupation: Actor
- Years active: 1949–2003

José Lewgoy (16 November 1920 – 10 February 2003) was a Brazilian actor. He is recognizable to many art-house cinema fans for his role as Don Aquilino in Werner Herzog's 1982 film Fitzcarraldo.

== Biography ==
Of Jewish origin, he was born in Veranópolis, Rio Grande do Sul, Brazil, to a Russian father and an American mother, who met in New York. He died in Rio de Janeiro. He was considered one of the best actors in Brazil, and was usually typecast as a villain.

== Selected filmography ==
- Carnaval no Fogo (1949) - Anjo
- Quando a Noite Acaba (1950)
- Katucha (1950)
- Cascalho (1950)
- Aviso aos navegantes (1950) - Professor Scaramouche
- Maior Que o Ódio (1951)
- Aí Vem o Barão (1951) - Von Mack
- Três Vagabundos (1952) - Schultz
- Carnaval Atlântida (1952) - Conde Verdura
- Barnabé Tu És Meu (1952) - Garcia
- Areias Ardentes (1952) - Ambrósio
- Amei um Bicheiro (1953) - Almeida
- Três Recrutas (1953)
- Carnaval em Caxias (1954) - Honório Boa Morte
- Matar ou Correr (1954) - Jesse Gordon
- Escapade (1957) - Caraco
- S.O.S. Noronha (1957) - Pratinho
- A Bomb for a Dictator (1957) - Ramirez
- Quand sonnera midi (1958) - Salvador
- História de um Crápula (1965)
- Mercenários do Crime (1966) - President (Rio segment) (uncredited)
- Ring Around the World (1966) - Hotel Manager (uncredited)
- As Cariocas (1966)
- Una rosa per tutti (1967) - Floreal
- Entranced Earth (1967) - Felipe Vieira
- Arrastão (1967)
- Jerry - a grande parada (1967) - Dr. Karloff
- Tarzan and the Jungle Boy (1968) - Djenda (uncredited)
- Palmeiras Negras (1968) - Pepito
- Roberto Carlos e o Diamante Cor-de-rosa (1968)
- Roberto Carlos em Ritmo de Aventura (1968) - Pierre
- Os Viciados (1968) - (segment "Trajetória, A")
- A Vida Provisória (1968)
- Operaçao Tumulto (1969) - Le père
- Os Paqueras (1969) - Marido
- A um Pulo da Morte (1969)
- A Cama Ao Alcance de Todos (1969) - Gangster
- O Donzelo (1970)
- Mortal Sin (1970) - José
- O Bolão (1970)
- Não Aperta, Aparício (1970)
- Pra Quem Fica, Tchau (1971) - Tio Gustavo
- Os Amores de Um Cafona (1971) - Almir
- Lua-de-Mel e Amendoim (1971) - Lover of Serginho's mother
- Gaudêncio, o Centauro dos Pampas (1971) - Giovanni
- A Viúva Virgem (1972) - Padre
- Independência ou Morte (1972)
- Os Mansos (1972) - (segment "A B... de Ouro")
- O Grande Gozador (1972)
- Como É Boa Nossa Empregada (1973) - Dr. Leonel (segment "O terror das empregadas")
- Relatório de Um Homem Casado (1974)
- Gente que Transa (1974) - Casimiro Bilac
- As Alegres Vigaristas (1974)
- Um Soutien Para Papai (1975)
- Intimidade (1975) - Industrialist
- Eu Dou O Que Ela Gosta (1975)
- As Secretárias... Que Fazem de Tudo (1975)
- O Flagrante (1976)
- Padre Cícero (1976)
- O Quarto da Viúva (1976)
- O Ibraim do Subúrbio (1976) - Casimiro de Abreu de Sousa
- O Homem de Papel (1976) - Raul
- Ouro Sangrento (1977)
- Os Mucker (1978) - Abílio
- O Outro Lado do Crime (1978) - Alberto Lima Cordeiro
- O Gigante da América (1978)
- Diário da Província (1978)
- Curumim (1978)
- Terror e Êxtase (1979) - Pai de Betinho
- República dos Assassinos (1979) - Gilberto
- Engraçadinha (1981) - Arnaldo
- Fitzcarraldo (1982) - Don Aquilino
- Tensão no Rio (1982)
- Tabu (1982) - João do Rio
- Perdida em Sodoma (1982) - Dr. Sander
- Blame It on Rio (1984) - Eduardo Marques
- Quando o Carnaval Chegar (1984) - Anjo
- Kiss of the Spider Woman (1985) - Warden
- Os Bons Tempos Voltaram, Vamos Gozar Outra Vez (1985) - Coronel (segment "Sábado Quente")
- Os Trapalhões e o Rei do Futebol (1986) - Dr.Velhaccio
- La Mansión de Araucaima (1986) - Don Graciliano 'Don Graci', The Landowner
- Cobra Verde (1987) - Don Octavio Coutinho
- The Lady from the Shanghai Cinema (1987) - Linus
- Moon over Parador (1988) - Archbishop
- Faca de Dois Gumes (1989) - Sr. Álvaro J. Amado
- Festa (1989)
- Sermões, a História de Antônio Vieira (1989)
- Stelinha (1990)
- O Escorpião Escarlate (1990)
- O Sorriso do Lagarto (1991, TV Mini Series) - Dr. Lúcio Nemésio
- Perfume de Gardênia (1992) - Ody Marques
- Boca (1994) - Quintella
- Mil e Uma (1994)
- O Quatrilho (1995) - Rocco
- O Monge e a Filha do Carrasco (1996) - Superior
- The Jew (1996) - D. Nuno da Cunha
- Anjo Mau (1997, TV Series) - Eduardo Medeiros
- Policarpo Quaresma, Herói do Brasil (1997) - Albernaz
- A Hora Mágica (1999) - Hilário / Max / Diretor
- Sonhos Tropicais (2001) - Tibério
- Apolônio Brasil, Campeão da Alegria (2003) - Dr. Boris Lewinsky - the brain scientist
- Chatô: O Rei do Brasil (2015) - General #1 (final film role)
