= Reginaldo Faria =

Brazilian actor

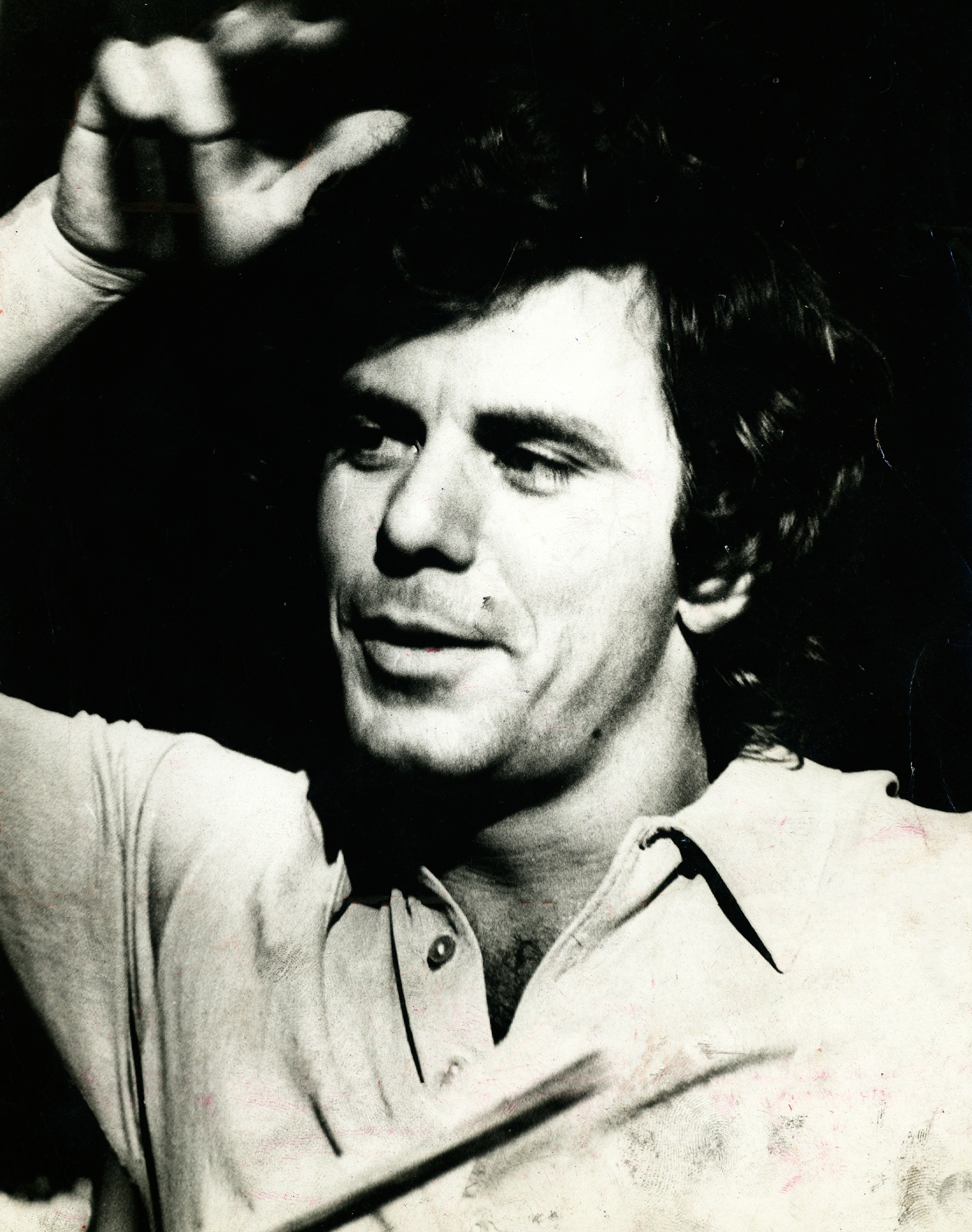
- Faria in 1971
- Born: 11 June 1937 (age 89); Nova Friburgo, Rio de Janeiro, Brazil
- Occupations: Actor, film director
- Years active: 1952–present
- Spouses: Rosa Ventura (div. 2004) Vânia Dotto Alves (m. 2005)
- Children: 3
- Relatives: Roberto Farias (brother)

Reginaldo Figueira de Faria (born 11 June 1937) is a Brazilian actor and film director. He has appeared in more than 60 films and television shows since 1952. Faria's brother Roberto Farias (the 's' was added to his surname due to an error at the registry) is also a film director and screenwriter.

== Selected filmography ==
Film

- Cidade Ameaçada (1960)
- The ABC of Love (1967)
- Pra Quem Fica, Tchau (1971)
- Lucio Flavio (1977)
- Pra Frente, Brasil (1982)
- Memórias Póstumas (2001)
- Cazuza – O Tempo Não Pára (2004)
- O Carteiro (2011)
- Velhos Bandidos (2026)

Television

- Vale Tudo (1988–1989)
- Tieta (1989–1990)
- Vamp (1991–1992)
- Olho no Olho (1993–1994)
- Explode Coração (1995–1996)
- Força de um Desejo (1999–2000)
- O Clone (2001–2002)
- Porto dos Milagres (2001)
- Cabocla (2004)
- América (2005)
- Paraíso Tropical (2007)
- Beleza Pura (2008)
- O Astro (2011)
- Cordel Encantado (2011)
- Amor Eterno Amor (2012)
- Louco por Elas (2012–2013)
- Joia Rara (2013–2014)
- Império (2014–2015)
