= Getúlio Côrtes =

Getúlio Francisco Côrtes (born 22 March 1938) is a singer, songwriter, and music player from Brazil.

Born in Rio de Janeiro, he began his career as a music artist by interpreting the music of American musicians such as Frank Sinatra and Louis Armstrong.

Côrtes gained notability as a songwriter thanks to fellow Brazilian musician Roberto Carlos, who received wide appraise for his interpretations of songs written by Côrtes. These songs include: Negro Gato (1966), Atitudes (1973), O Sósia (1967), O Gênio (1966), Noite de Terror (1965), Por Motivo de Força Maior (1976).
