= Erasmo Carlos =

Brazilian singer (1941–2022)

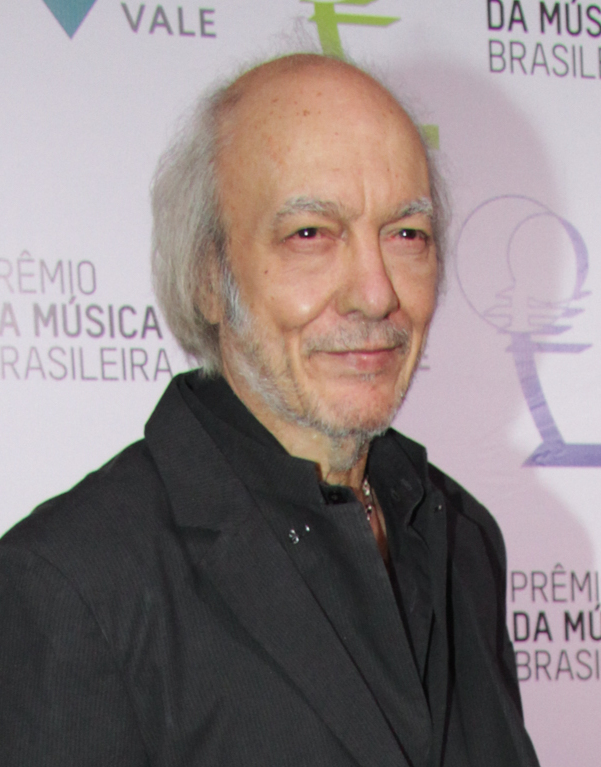
- Carlos in 2015

Background information
- Born: Erasmo Esteves; 5 June 1941; Rio de Janeiro, Brazil
- Died: 22 November 2022 (aged 81) Rio de Janeiro, Brazil
- Genres: MPB; rock and roll; rockabilly; soul; bossa nova; rhythm and blues; samba rock
- Occupations: Singer-songwriter, actor
- Instruments: Vocals, guitar
- Years active: 1958–2022

Erasmo Carlos (born Erasmo Esteves; 5 June 1941 – 22 November 2022) was a Brazilian singer and songwriter, most closely associated with his friend and longtime collaborator Roberto Carlos (no relation). Together, they created many chart hits including "É proibido fumar", "Sentado à beira do caminho", "Além do horizonte", "Amigo" and "Festa de arromba".

A core member of the Jovem Guarda ("Young Guard") scene of 1960s Brazilian pop-rock, Erasmo often appeared on television, in magazines and feature films with fellow teen idols Roberto Carlos and Wanderléa.

== Early life and career ==
Erasmo Esteves was born in the neighbourhood of Tijuca in the North Zone of Rio de Janeiro. Carlos knew Sebastião Rodrigues Maia (who would later be known as Tim Maia) since childhood. Maia taught him his first chords on guitar.

In 1957, Roberto Carlos joined Maia's vocal group The Sputniks beside Arlênio Silva, Edson Trindade and Wellington. After a fight between Tim and Roberto, the group disbanded. The year after that Arlênio decided to call Erasmo and two other friends from Tijuca, Robert and José Edson Trindade, known as "China", to form the vocal group The Snakes later renamed to The Boys of Rock.

At the suggestion of Carlos Imperial, the group was renamed The Snakes. They backed both Roberto and Tim Maia in their respective shows.

Roberto Carlos needed the lyrics to the song "Hound Dog," a hit by Elvis Presley. Arlênio Livy told him Erasmo had the lyrics, as he was a big fan of Elvis. Roberto then discovered other affinities with Erasmo, as both of them liked Bob Nelson, James Dean, Marlon Brando, Marilyn Monroe, and cheering for Vasco da Gama. Tim Maia taught Erasmo how to play guitar. Erasmo decided to adopt the name Carlos in his stage name, in honor of Roberto Carlos and Carlos Imperial. Before going solo, Erasmo was also part of the band Renato e seus Blue Caps in 1962.

Erasmo participated effectively with Roberto Carlos and Wanderléa in the Jovem Guarda television show, where he had the nickname "Tremendão" (The Big Tremendous), imitating the clothes and style of his idol Elvis Presley. His greatest successes as a singer in this phase were "Gatinha manhosa" and "Festa de arromba." He had been rumored to become the main presenter of the program, but Roberto Carlos ended up taking the spot. Roberto and Erasmo, as songwriting partners, were criticized for singing and writing rock music and being thus "Americanized". As a response, "Coqueiro verde" was the first samba-rock recorded by Erasmo. Although it was not Erasmo's first foray into a samba derivative, in 1966, Elza Soares recorded the sambalanço "Toque o Balanço" (co-written by Roberto).

== 1970s ==
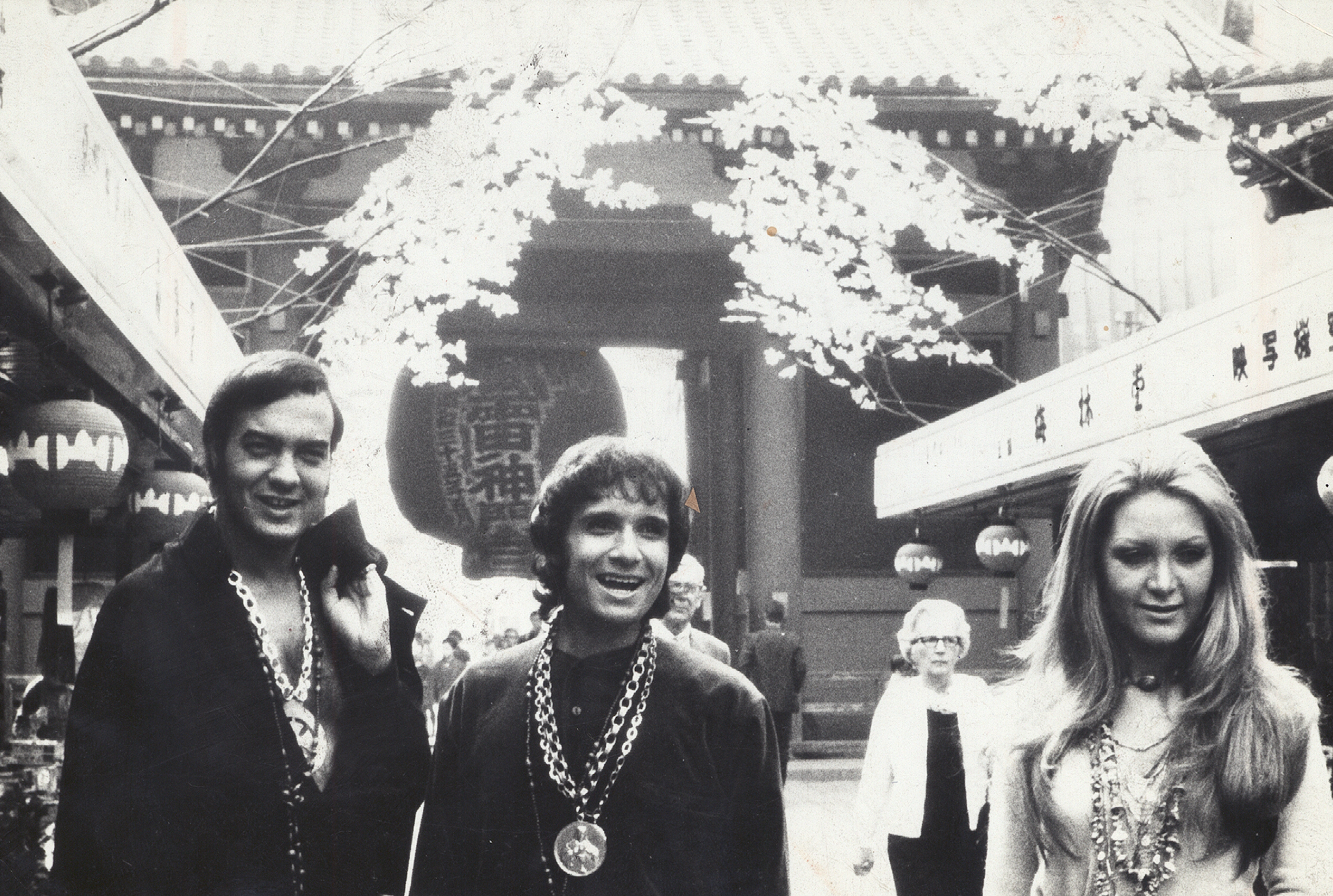
Carlos with Roberto Carlos and Wanderléa in 1972

In the 1970s, Erasmo signed with Polydor. For the first half of the decade, his shows were very different from that of the Jovem Guarda movement. Influenced by the hippie culture and soul music, he released Carlos, Erasmo in 1971. The album, which opens with "De Noite na cama", written by Caetano Veloso for him, was a controversial ode to marijuana.

== 1980s ==
Erasmo Carlos begins the 1980s with an ambitious project, which Erasmo called a pioneer project in Brazil. There were 12 songs performed as duets with artists like Wanderléa, Nara Leão, Maria Bethânia, Gal Costa, A Cor do Som, As Frenéticas, Gilberto Gil, Rita Lee, Tim Maia, Jorge Ben and Caetano Veloso. The opening track of the album was the radio single: a cover of "Sentado à beira do caminho", featuring his longtime songwriting partner Roberto Carlos.

== Later years ==
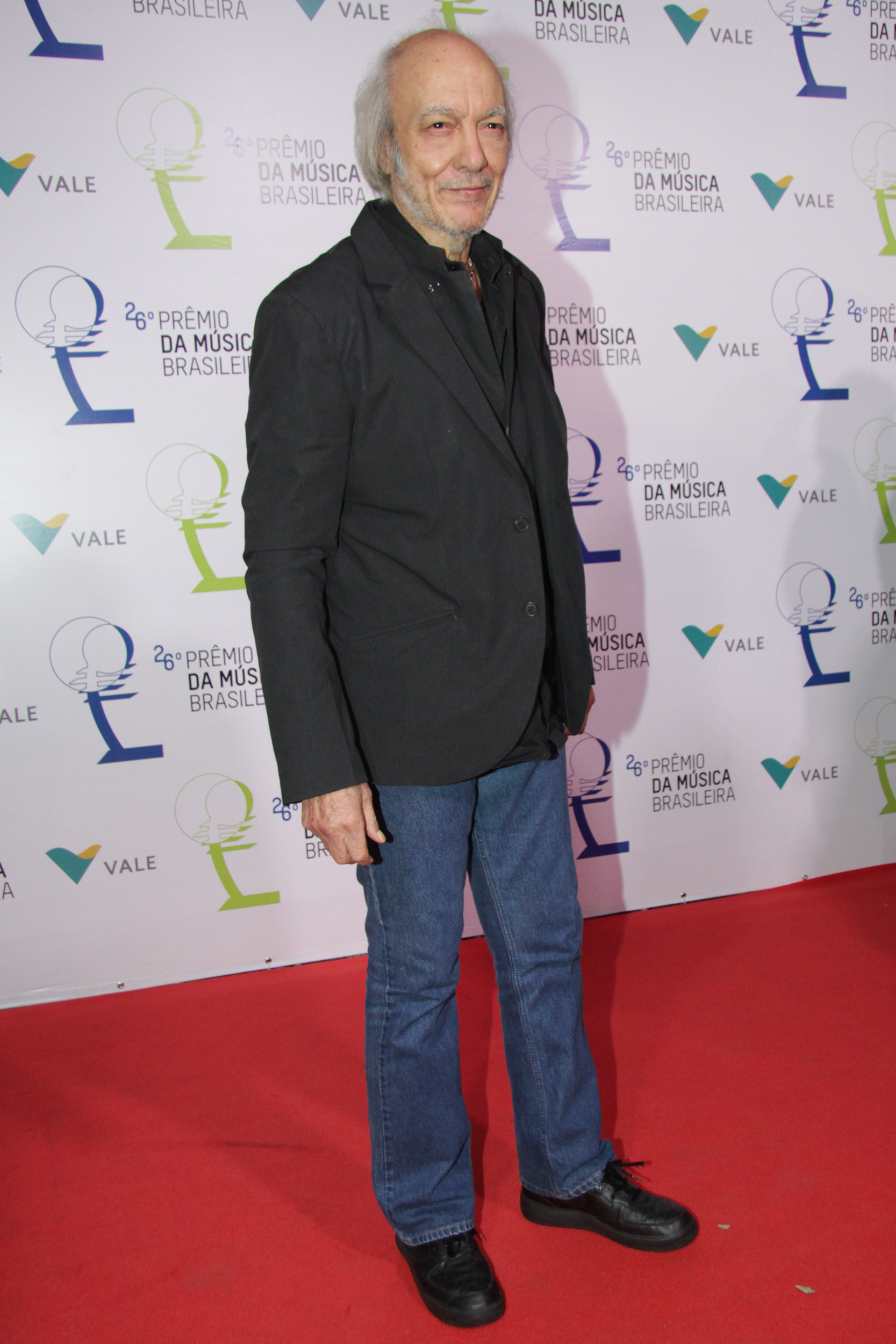
Carlos in 2015

In 2001, Erasmo released a new record. Pra falar de amor brought his interpretations to songs written by different writers, such as Kiko Zambianchi and Marcelo Camelo. The highlight is "Mais um na multidão", a duet with Marisa Monte and Erasmo Carlos written by Marisa Monte and Carlinhos Brown. The following year, he released his first live DVD, plus a double CD.

On June 5, 2009, the day he turned 68 years, Erasmo released the album Rock 'n' Roll, a tribute to the genre that influenced him most, with 12 of his compositions, with seven in partnership: Nando Reis ("Um beijo é um tiro" and "Mar vermelho"), Nelson Motta (on "Chuva ácida" and "Noturno carioca"), Chico Amaral (in "Noite perfeita" and "A guitarra é uma mulher"), and Liminha and Patricia Travassos (in "Celebridade"). Another highlight is "Olhar de mangá" in which Erasmo names 52 female personalities (real or fictional) -- the song is inspired by the facial expressions used in manga Japanese comics. In 2011, he released an album called Sex.

His album ...Amor É Isso was ranked as the 10th best Brazilian album of 2018 by the Brazilian edition of Rolling Stone magazine and among the 25 best Brazilian albums of the first half of 2018 by the São Paulo Association of Art Critics.

Erasmo Carlos was portrayed by Chay Suede in the 2019 biographical film Minha fama de mau. He was also portrayed by Tito Naville in the 2014 biographical film Tim Maia.

On July 2, 2021, a documentary film titled Erasmo 80 following his career was released on Globoplay.

=== Death ===
Carlos died on 22 November 2022, at the age of 81.

== Discography ==
Studio albums

- 1965 - A Pescaria
- 1966 - Você Me Acende
- 1967 - Erasmo Carlos
- 1967 - O Tremendão: Erasmo Carlos
- 1968 - Erasmo
- 1970 - Erasmo Carlos e os Tremendões
- 1971 - Carlos, Erasmo
- 1972 - Sonhos e Memórias
- 1974 - Projeto Salva Terra
- 1976 - Banda dos Contentes
- 1978 - Pelas Esquinas de Ipanema
- 1980 - Erasmo Convida
- 1981 - Mulher
- 1982 - Amar pra Viver ou Morrer de Amor
- 1984 - Buraco Negro
- 1985 - Erasmo Carlos
- 1986 - Abra Seus Olhos
- 1988 - Apesar do Tempo Claro...
- 1992 - Homem de Rua
- 1996 - É Preciso Saber Viver
- 2001 - Pra Falar de Amor
- 2004 - Santa Música
- 2007 - Erasmo Convida, Volume II
- 2009 - Rock 'n' Roll
- 2011 - Sexo
- 2014 - Gigante Gentil
- 2018 - Amor é Isso
- 2019 - Quem Foi Que Disse Que Eu Não Faço Samba...
- 2022 - O Futuro Pertence à... Jovem Guarda
- 2024 - Erasmo Esteves

Live albums

- 1975 - Hollywood Rock (shared with Raul Seixas, O Peso, Rita Lee and Tutti Frutti)
- 1989 - Sou uma Criança
- 2001 - Ao Vivo
- 2012 - 50 Anos de Estrada
- 2015 - Meus Lados B
