= 27th Brazilian Music Awards =

2016 edition of award ceremony

- Date: 22 June 2016
- Location: Theatro Municipal; Rio de Janeiro
- Hosted by: Dira Paes; Júlio Andrade

Highlights
- Most awards: Zélia Duncan (3)
- Most nominations: Zélia Duncan (5)
- Website: premiodamusica.com.br

Television/radio coverage
- Network: Canal Brasil

The 27th Brazilian Music Awards (Portuguese: 27.° Prêmio da Música Brasileira) were held on 22 June 2016, at the Theatro Municipal in Rio de Janeiro, to recognize the Brazilian music of 2015. The ceremony was hosted by actors Dira Paes and Júlio Andrade, and was broadcast by Canal Brasil. Gonzaguinha was honored at the ceremony.

== Winners and nominees ==
The nominees were announced on 17 May 2016. Zélia Duncan led with five nominations. She is followed by Elba Ramalho with four, while Caetano Veloso, Elza Soares, Gilberto Gil and Renato Teixeira received three nominations each. Duncan won the most awards of the night, with three wins. Winners are listed first and highlighted in boldface.

=== MPB ===
Best Male Singer	Best Female Singer
**Caetano Veloso**; Djavan; Gilberto Gil	**Virginia Rodrigues**; Elba Ramalho; Ná Ozzetti
Best Group	Best Album
**Dônica**; Dá no Coro; Novíssimos	**Dois Amigos, Um Século de Música – Caetano Veloso and Gilberto Gil**; **Caetano Veloso and Gilberto Gil, producers**; Do Meu Olhar pra Fora – Elba Ramalho; Luã Mattar and Yuri Queiroga, producers; Mama Kalunga – Virginia Rodrigues; Tiganá Santana and Sebastian Notini, producers

=== Special awards ===
Classical Album	Electronic Album
**Heitor Villa-Lobos: Sinfonia Nº12, Uirapuru, Mandu-Çarará – performed by Orquestra Sinfônica do Estado de São Paulo**; Seresta, Choro e Homenagem a Fructuoso Vianna – Camargo Guarnieri, performed by Karin Fernandes and Orquestra Sinfônica da USP; Sinfonia Nº3, Suíte Cita e Esboço de Outono – Sergei Prokofiev, performed by Orquestra Sinfônica do Estado de São Paulo	**Gaia Música, Vol. 1 – DJ Tudo e Sua Gente de Todo Lugar**; **DJ Tudo, producer**; Raw Wave – Seashore Darkcave; Mário Mamede, producer; Sotaque Recarregado – DJ Mam; DJ Mam, Alex Moreira, Marcelinho da Lua, Bruno LT, DeepLick, Batida Nacional, DJ Patife, Furmiga Dub, Mauro Telefunksoul, André T, DJ Tide, DJ Raíz, Lucio K, DJ Waldo Squash, Luan Rodrigues, DJ Incidental, Projeto Ccoma and DJ Kenneth Bager, producers
Children's Album	Album in Foreign Language
**Para Ficar com Você – Palavra Cantada**; **Paulo Tatit and Sandra Peres, producers**; Estórias de Cantar – Banda Estralo; Marcos Lucatelli, producer; Crianceiras – Poesias de Mário Quintana – Márcio de Camillo; Márcio de Camillo, producer	**Cauby Sings Nat King Cole – Cauby Peixoto**; **Thiago Marques Luiz, producer**; Canela – Renato Braz and Maogani; Sergio Valdeos and Maogani, producers; Unexpected – Indiana Nomma and Osmar Milito; Indiana Nomma and Osmar Milito, producers
Special Project Album	Best DVD
**Café no Bule – Zeca Baleiro, Naná Vasconcelos and Paulo Lepetit**; **Zeca Baleiro, Naná Vasconcelos and Paulo Lepetit, producers**; Sambabook Dona Ivone Lara – Various artists; Musickeria, producer; Sambas para a Mangueira – Various artists; Nilcemar Nogueira, producer	**Loucura: Adriana Calcanhotto Canta Lupicínio Rodrigues – Adriana Calcanhotto**; **Gabriela Gastal, director**; Baby Sucessos: A Menina Ainda Dança – Baby do Brasil; Paula Lavigne and Fernando Young, directors; Dois Amigos, Um Século de Música – Caetano Veloso and Gilberto Gil; Fernando Young, Henrique Alqualo and Pedro Secchin, directors

=== Regional ===
Best Male Singer	Best Female Singer
**Xangai**; Renato Teixeira; Sérgio Reis	**Elba Ramalho**; Alessandra Leão; Socorro Lira
Best Group	Best Duo
**Ilê Aiyê**; Catadoras de Mangaba de Sergipe; Cia. Cabelo de Maria	**Almir Sater and Renato Teixeira**; Caju & Castanha; Cezar & Paulinho
Best Album
**Cordas, Gonzaga e Afins (Sagrama e Encore) – Elba Ramalho**; **Sergio Campello and Tostão Queiroga, producers**; AR – Almir Sater and Renato Teixeira; Almir Sater and Eric Silver, producers; Xangai – Xangai; Mario Ulloa, producer

=== Pop/Rock/Reggae/Hip Hop/Funk ===
Best Male Singer	Best Female Singer
**Lenine**; Chico César; Seu Jorge	**Gal Costa**; Elza Soares; Simone Mazzer
Best Group	Best Album
**Titãs**; Funk Como Le Gusta; Maglore	**A Mulher do Fim do Mundo – Elza Soares**; **Guilherme Kastrup, producer**; Carbono – Lenine; Lenine, Jr. Tostoi and Bruno Giorgi, producers; Dilúvio – Dani Black; Conrado Goys, producer

=== Popular music ===
Best Male Singer	Best Female Singer
**Roberto Carlos**; Luiz Caldas; Vander Lee	**Fafá de Belém**; Angela Maria; Vanusa
Best Group	Best Duo
**Jamz**; Banda Calypso; Melanina Carioca	**Chitãozinho & Xororó**; João Bosco & Vinícius; Victor & Leo
Best Album
**Do Tamanho Certo para o Meu Sorriso – Fafá de Belém**; **Felipe Cordeiro and Manoel Cordeiro, producers**; Angela à Vontade em Voz e Violão – Angela Maria; Thiago Marques Luiz, producer; Tom do Sertão – Chitãozinho & Xororó; Cláudio Paladini, Ney Marques and Edgard Poças, producers

=== Instrumental ===
Best Group	Soloist
**Tocata à Amizade**; Barbatuques; Pau Brasil	**Hamilton de Holanda**; Nailor Proveta; Yamandu Costa
Best Album
**Tocata à Amizade – Tocata à Amizade**; **Yamandu Costa and Rogério Caetano, producers**; Brasileiro Saxofone, Vol.2 – Nailor Proveta; Paulo Aragão and Maurício Carrilho, producers; Sebastião Biano e Seu Terno Esquenta Muié – Sebastião Biano; André Magalhães, producer

=== Samba ===
Best Male Singer	Best Female Singer
**Alfredo Del-Penho**; Arlindo Cruz; Zeca Pagodinho	**Zélia Duncan**; Ana Costa; Renata Jambeiro
Best Group	Best Album
**Moacyr Luz e Samba do Trabalhador**; Fundo de Quintal; Trio Gato com Fome	**Antes do Mundo Acabar – Zélia Duncan**; **Bia Paes Leme, producer**; Moacyr Luz e Samba do Trabalhador – 10 Anos e Outros Sambas – Moacyr Luz e Samba do Trabalhador; Moacyr Luz, producer; Terreiros – Roque Ferreira; Julio Caldas, producer

=== Other awards ===
Best Song	New Artist
**"Antes do Mundo Acabar" – Zélia Duncan**; **Zeca Baleiro and Zélia Duncan, songwriters**; "Mulher do Fim do Mundo" – Elza Soares; Romulo Fróes and Alice Coutinho, songwriters; "Por Água Abaixo" – Zélia Duncan; Pretinho da Serrinha, Leandro Fab and Fred Camacho, songwriters	**Simone Mazzer**; Alfredo Del-Penho; Trio Capitu
Visual Project	Arranger
**Dancê – Tulipa Ruiz**; **Tereza Bettinardi, art director**; Café no Bule – Zeca Baleiro, Naná Vasconcelos and Paulo Lepetit; Marcos Faria, art director; Antes do Mundo Acabar – Zélia Duncan; Simone Mina, art director	**Guinga**; **Porto da Madama – Guinga**; Francis Hime; 50 Anos de Música – Francis Hime; Swami Jr.; Partir – Fabiana Cozza
