= 29th Brazilian Music Awards =

2018 edition of award ceremony

- Date: 15 August 2018
- Location: Theatro Municipal; Rio de Janeiro
- Hosted by: Camila Pitanga; Débora Bloch
- Website: premiodamusica.com.br

Television/radio coverage
- Network: Canal Brasil; YouTube

The 29th Brazilian Music Awards (Portuguese: 29.° Prêmio da Música Brasileira) were held on 15 August 2018, at the Theatro Municipal in Rio de Janeiro. The ceremony was hosted by actresses Camila Pitanga and Débora Bloch, and was broadcast on Canal Brasil and YouTube. Luiz Melodia was honored at the ceremony.

== Winners and nominees ==
The nominees were announced on 17 July 2018. Winners are listed first and highlighted in boldface.

=== MPB ===
Best Male Singer	Best Female Singer
**João Bosco**; Dori Caymmi; Zé Renato	**Zélia Duncan**; Joyce Moreno; Zizi Possi
Best Group	Best Album
**Equale**; Ordinarius; Quarteto do Rio	**Caravanas – Chico Buarque**; Voz de Mágoa – Dori Caymmi; Mano que Zuera – João Bosco

=== Special awards ===
Classical Album	Electronic Album
**Heitor Villa-Lobos: Sinfonias Nº 8, 9 e 11 – São Paulo State Symphony Orchestra**; Brahms – Nelson Freire; Villa-Lobos, Quartetos e Cordas – Quarteto Bessler-Reis and Quarteto Amazônia	**Sintetizamor – João Donato and Donatinho**; Frevotron – Spok, DJ Dolores and Yuri Queiroga
Children's Album	Album in Foreign Language
**Deu Bicho na Casa – Sula Kossatz**; Música de Brinquedo 2 – Pato Fu; Sem Você Não A – Tom Zé	**Ay, amor! – Fabiana Cozza**; Lessons in Love – Indiana Nomma; Walkin' in White Shoes – David Kerr and Canastra Trio
Special Project Album	Best DVD
**Tatanaguê – Théo de Barros and Renato Braz**; O Auto do Reino do Sol – Barca dos Corações Partidos; Jobim Orquestra e Convidados – Paulo Jobim and Mario Adnet	**Jobim Orquestra e Convidados – Paulo Jobim and Mario Adnet**; Do Tamanho Certo Para o Meu Sorisso – Ao Vivo – Fafá de Belém; Histórias e Canções – Bibi Ferreira
Best Music Video
**"Culpa" – O Terno**; "Maracutaia" – Karol Conká; "A Volta Pra Casa" – Rincon Sapiência

=== Regional ===
Best Male Singer	Best Female Singer
**Mestrinho**; Renato Teixeira; Vitoru Kinjo	**Mônica Salmaso**; Andrezza Formiga; Lia Sophia
Best Group	Best Duo
**Trio Nordestino**; Quinteto Violado; Sertanilia	**As Galvão**; Duo Balangulá; Kleber Albuquerque & Rubi
Best Album
**Caipira – Mônica Salmaso**; É Tempo de Viver – Mestrinho; Terra dos Sonhos – Renato Teixeira and Orquestra do Estado do Mato Grosso

=== Pop/Rock/Reggae/Hip Hop/Funk ===
Best Male Singer	Best Female Singer
**Lulu Santos**; Almério; Chico César	**Gal Costa**; Simone Mazzer; Tulipa Ruiz
Best Group	Best Album
**Novos Baianos**; Nação Zumbi; Tribalistas	**Estado de Poesia (Ao Vivo) – Chico César**; Acabou Chorare – Novos Baianos Se Encontram – Novos Baianos; Estratosférica Ao Vivo – Gal Costa

=== Popular music ===
Best Male Singer	Best Female Singer
**Roberto Carlos**; Leo Russo; Tibério Azul	**Alcione**; Amelinha; Angela Maria
Best Group	Best Duo
**As Bahias e a Cozinha Mineira**; Psirico; Trio Parada Dura	**Chitãozinho & Xororó**; Lourenço & Lourival; Zezé Di Camargo & Luciano
Best Album
**Bixa – As Bahias e a Cozinha Mineira**; Ângela Maria e as Canções de Roberto & Erasmo – Angela Maria; Coração – Johnny Hooker

=== Instrumental ===
Best Group	Soloist
**Hermeto Pascoal e Grupo**; Alessandro Kramer Quarteto; Hamilton de Holanda Quinteto	**Yamandu Costa**; Hamilton de Holanda; Hermeto Pascoal
Best Album
**Quebranto – Yamandu Costa and Alessandro Penezzi**; Casa de Bituca – Hamilton de Holanda Quinteto; No Mundo dos Sons – Hermeto Pascoal e Grupo

=== Samba ===
Best Male Singer	Best Female Singer
**Criolo**; Diogo Nogueira; Thiago Miranda	**Leci Brandão**; Ana Costa; Sandra Portella
Best Group	Best Album
**Moacyr Luz e Samba do Trabalhador**; Épreta; Tempero Carioca	**Samba do Trabalhador (Ao Vivo no Bar Pirajá) – Moacyr Luz e Samba do Trabalhador**; Espiral de Ilusão – Criolo; Munduê – Diogo Nogueira

=== Other awards ===
Best Song	New Artist
**"Tua Cantiga" – Cristovão Bastos and Chico Buarque**; "As Caravanas" – Chico Buarque; "Massarandupió" – Chico Brown and Chico Buarque	**Almério**; Pedro Franco; Tim Bernardes
Visual Project	Arranger
**Campos Neutrais – Vitor Ramil**; Tribalistas – Tribalistas; Invento – Zélia Duncan and Jaques Morelenbaum	**Mario Adnet (Jobim Orquestra e Convidados – Paulo Jobim and Mario Adnet)**; Flávio Mendes (Danilo Caymmi Canta Tom Jobim – Danilo Caymmi); Mario Adnet (Saudade Maravilhosa – Mario Adnet)
