= 33rd Brazilian Music Awards =

2026 Brazilian Music Awards

- Date: 10 June 2026
- Location: Theatro Municipal; Rio de Janeiro
- Hosted by: Débora Bloch and Alice Wegmann

Highlights
- Most awards: João Gomes (3)
- Most nominations: João Gomes and Luedji Luna (4 each)
- Website: premiodamusica.com.br

Television/radio coverage
- Network: YouTube

The 33rd Brazilian Music Awards (Portuguese: 33.° Prêmio da Música Brasileira) were held on 10 June 2026, at the Theatro Municipal in Rio de Janeiro, to recognize the Brazilian music of 2025. It was second edition sponsored by BTG Pactual. The ceremony was hosted by actresses Débora Bloch and Alice Wegmann and was broadcast live on YouTube. Cazuza was honored at the ceremony. The nominees were announced in March 2026. João Gomes and Luedji Luna led with four nominations each. Gomes was the most awarded artist, with three wins.

== Winners and nominees ==
The nominees were announced on 25 March 2026, at the BTG Pactual Hall in São Paulo, by Fábio Porchat. João Gomes and Luedji Luna received the most nominations with four each, followed by Baco Exu do Blues, BaianaSystem, Lenine, Mestrinho, Orquestra Malassombro and Xande de Pilares with three nominations each. Gomes was the biggest winner, with three awards. Chitãozinho & Xororó, Djavan, Luedji Luna and Mestrinho won two awards each.

Winners are listed first and highlighted in boldface.

=== Axé ===
Artist	Release
**Olodum**; Daniela Mercury; Ivete Sangalo; Margareth Menezes; Timbalada	**Cirandaia – Daniela Mercury**; **Daniela Mercury, Juliano Valle and Gabriel Mercury, producers**; O Verão Bateu em Minha Porta – Ivete Sangalo; Radamés Venâncio, producer; "Ramalhete de Flor" – Margareth Menezes; Tito Oliveira, Margareth Menezes and Manoel EL Xiri, producers; "Ginga Olodum" – Olodum and BaianaSystem; Lucas Di Fiori, Pugah, Seko Bass and Titoxossi, producers; "Fervo na Cidade" – Timbalada; Denny Denan and Reudes Nogueira, producers

=== Popular music ===
Artist	Release
**João Gomes**; Joelma; Lucy Alves; Peninha; Simone Mendes	**Pé de Serrita – João Gomes**; **João Gomes, Daniel Mendes and Mestrinho, producers**; "Vem, Love" – Felipe Cordeiro, Otto and Duda Brack; Cuper and Felipe Cordeiro, producers; "Lua dos Apaixonados (Ao Vivo)" – Joelma; Diego Ramos, producer; "Não Quero Te Querer" – Mariana Volker and Maria Gadú; Mariana Volker and Mayra Corrêa, producers; Cantando Sua História 2 (Ao Vivo) – Simone Mendes; Eduardo Pepato, producer

=== Funk ===
Artist	Release
**Deize Tigrona**; Enme; Mac Júlia; MC Kevin o Chris; O Kannalha	**Aí Dentu: Funk de Embolada e Hip Hop do Mato – Totonho e os Cabra**; **André Abujamra, Renato Oliveira, Marcelo Macedo, Furmiga Dub and Rica Amabis, producers**; "Nós é Firme, Não é Creme" – Deize Tigrona; Mahal Pita, KD Soundsystem and DJ Chernobyl, producers; Músicas Para Marolar – King Saints; Pharfa, DMAX, Neno, Maux, Mulú, PB Campos, Papatinho, Five, DetonaCry, TH4i and Los Brasileiros, producers; "Jetski" – Pedro Sampaio, MC Meno K and Melody; Pedro Sampaio and Pedro Breder, producers; "Dilema" – Rico Dalasam; Pedro Lima, Pedro Lucas Ferraz and Rico Dalasam, producers

=== Instrumental ===
Artist	Release
**Hamilton de Holanda**; Alessandro Penezzi; Antônio Adolfo; João Camarero; Rogério Caetano	**Baden – João Camarero**; **Alexandre Fontanetti, producer**; Sonhos – Alessandro Penezzi; Alessandro Penezzi and Heloiza Manoel da Silva, producers; Obra viva de Hermeto Pascoal – Vol. 1: flautas – Andrea Ernest Dias, Aline Gonçalves, Eduardo Neves and Carlos Malta; Bernardo Ramos, producer; Carnaval – The Songs Were So Beautiful – Antonio Adolfo; Antonio Adolfo, producer; Hamilton de Holanda Trio – Live in NYC – Hamilton de Holanda; Hamilton de Holanda and Marcos Portinari, producers

=== MPB ===
Artist	Release
**Djavan**; Dori Caymmi; Marisa Monte; Mateus Aleluia; Mônica Salmaso	**Improviso – Djavan**; **Djavan, producer**; Utopia – Dori Caymmi; Jorge Helder, producer; Mateus Aleluia – Mateus Aleluia; Mateus Aleluia, Tadeu Mascarenhas and Tenille Bezerra, producers; Minha Casa – Mônica Salmaso; Mônica Salmaso and Teco Cardoso, producers; Afim – Zé Ibarra; Zé Ibarra and Lucas Nunes, producers

=== Pop ===
Artist	Release
**Luedji Luna**; BaianaSystem; Lenine; Marina Sena; Os Garotin	**Antes que a Terra Acabe – Luedji Luna**; **Fejuca, Kato Change, Zudizilla, Lucas Cirillo, Duda Raup, Iuri Rio Branco, Toty S'amed and Luedji Luna, producers**; O Mundo dá Voltas – BaianaSystem; Daniel Ganjaman, producer; Eita – Lenine; Bruno Giorgi, producer; Pelos Olhos do Mar – Lia de Itamaracá and Daúde; Marcus Preto and Pupillo, producers; Um Mar Pra Cada Um – Luedji Luna; Zudizilla, Duda Raupp, Lucas Romero, Curumin, Kato Change and Luedji Luna, producers

=== Roots ===
Artist	Release
**Mestrinho**; Dona Onete; Geraldo Azevedo; João Gomes; Orquestra Malassombro	**Recife, Início, Meio e Fim – Orquestra Malassombro**; **Rafael Marques, producer**; Frevo Macuca – Boi da Macuca and Henrique Albino; Henrique Albino, producer; "Quatro Contas" – Dona Onete; Marcos Sarrazin, producer; Macaco Sessions: Mestrinho (Ao Vivo) – Mestrinho; Mestrinho and Daniel Mendes, producers; Santanna "o Cantador" Canta Petrúcio Amorim – Santanna, o Cantador; José Milton, producer

=== Rap/Trap ===
Artist	Release
**BK'**; Baco Exu do Blues; Don L; Emicida; Negra Li	**Caro Vapor II – Qual a Forma de Pagamento? – Don L**; **Don L, Iuri Rio Branco and Nave, producers**; Hasos – Baco Exu do Blues; Marcelo Delamare, Marcos Maurício, Dactes and JLZ, producers; Diamantes, Lágrimas e Rostos para Esquecer – BK'; BK', MEC Life ENT, Theo Zagrae, Victor Senedesi and Gabriel Andrade, producers; Emicida Racional VoL.2: Mesmas Cores e Mesmos Valores – Emicida; Emicida, Damien Seth and Fejuca, producers; Assaltos e Batidas – FBC; Coyote Beatz, Pepito, DJ Cost and Nathan Morais, producers

=== Reggae ===
Artist	Release
**Maneva**; Alma Djem; Maskavo; Ponto de Equilíbrio; Sintonize	**"O Seu Silêncio" – Bia Ferreira and Little Lion Sound**; **Little Lion Sound and Irie Yute, producers**; Acústico Alma Djem (Ao Vivo) – Alma Djem; Sarpa, producer; "Saci" – Capilé and Chico César; Fernando Nunes, producer; "Além-Mar" – Maskavo; Maskavo and Alexandre Campos, producers; Original Brasileiro – Sintonize; Rafael Senegal, producer

=== Rock ===
Artist	Release
**Black Pantera**; Fresno; Mateus Fazeno Rock; Selvagens à Procura de Lei; Terno Rei	**Nenhuma Estrela – Terno Rei**; **Gustavo Schirmer, producer**; "Seleção Natural" – Black Pantera; Rafael Ramos, producer; Y – Selvagens à Procura de Lei; Gabriel Aragão and Matheus Brasil, producers; Caranguejo (Parte 1) – Supercombo; Supercombo and Victor de Souza (Jotta), producers; Hasta la Bahia – Vivendo do Ócio; André T, producer

=== Samba ===
Artist	Release
**Alcione**; Jorge Aragão; Moacyr Luz e Samba do Trabalhador; Péricles; Xande de Pilares	**Pagode do Pericão (Ao Vivo em São Paulo) – Péricles**; **Izaías Marcelo, producer**; Alcione – Alcione; Alexandre Menezes, producer; 20 Anos – Moacyr Luz e Samba do Trabalhador; Leandro Pereira, producer; Nos Braços do Povo Vol. 1 (Ao Vivo) – Xande de Pilares; João Carlos Filho, producer; "Empretecendo" – Xande de Pilares and Neguinho da Beija-Flor; Xande de Pilares and Luciano Broa, producers

=== Sertanejo ===
Artist	Release
**Chitãozinho & Xororó**; Ana Castela; Bruna Viola; Lauana Prado; Yasmin Santos	**"Meninos de Roça" – Chitãozinho & Xororó**; **Cláudio Paladini, producer**; Let's Go Rodeo – Ana Castela; Ender Thomas, Antony Albert Guajardo "Zsurround" and Eduardo Godoy, producers; Improvável (Live) – Bruna Viola; Flávio Guimarães, producer; Raiz BH (Ao Vivo) – Lauana Prado; Lauana Prado and William Santos, producers; Eu, Yasmin Santos (Ao Vivo) – Yasmin Santos; Gabriel Pascoal, producer

=== Other categories ===
New Artist	Electronic Release
**Fitti**; Joaquim; Orquestra Malassombro; Pedro Emílio; Zaynara	**Cabaça – Africanoise**; **Africanoise, producer**; "Rabecada" – Afterclapp and Furmiga Dub; Afterclapp and Furmiga Dub, producers; Cuteboyz – Badsista; Entropia, producer; "Saudade" – DJ Memê; DJ Memê, producer; Just Like Heaven EP – Zopelar; Zopelar, producer
Classical Release	Foreign Language Release
**Gunûncho – Gabriele Leite**; **Erika Ribeiro, producer**; Mendelssohn & Tchaikovsky: Violin Concertos – Guido Sant'Anna, Orquestra Sinfônica do Estado de São Paulo and Thierry Fischer; Ulrich Schneider, producer; Villa-Lobos, Piazzolla & Mehmari: Orchestral Works – Orquestra Ouro Preto; Maestro Rodrigo Toffolo, producer; "Abertura Brasil 2014 (Ao Vivo)" – Orquestra Sinfônica Brasileira and Cláudio Cruz; Fundação Orquestra Sinfônica Brasileira, producer; Sinfonia em Sol Menor (Ao Vivo) – Orquestra Sinfônica Brasileira and Cláudio Cruz; Fundação Orquestra Sinfônica Brasileira, producer	**Rhonda's Boots & Legs (Live) – Silvia Machete**; **Lalo Brusco, producer**; "Habana" – Francisca Barreto; Victor Kroner abd Francisca Barreto, producers; Guga Stroeter e Orquestra HB Apresentam: Elas Cantam Chet (br) – Guga Stroeter; Guga Stroeter, producer; Mercedes Sosa: A Voz dos Sem Voz – Volume II – Indiana Nomma and André Pinto Siqueira; Indiana Nomma, producer; "Alfonsina Y El Mar" – João Fênix and Virgínia Rodrigues; Jorge Helder, producer
Audiovisual Project	Special Project
**Rock Doido – Gaby Amarantos**; **Guilherme Takshy, Naré and Gaby Amarantos, directors**; "O que a Julia Vai Ser?" – Ajuliacosta; Fernanda Correrua, director; "Que Eu Sofra" – Baco Exu do Blues and Zeca Veloso; Og Cruz, director; Eita – Lenine; Lenine, Kabé Pinheiro and Laís Branco, directors; "Apocalipse" – Luedji Luna, Seu Jorge and Arthur Verocai; Barbara Magri, Lucas Teixeira and Pedro Moura, directors	**Dominguinho – João Gomes, Mestrinho and Jota.pê**; **Daniel Mendes, João Gomes, Jota.pê and Mestrinho, producers**; Caetano e Bethânia Ao Vivo – Caetano Veloso and Maria Bethânia; Lucas Nunes, producer; Relícario: Inezita Barroso (Ao Vivo no Sesc 1978) – Inezita Barroso; Selo Sesc, producer; Elas Cantam Donato – Várias artistas; Regina Oreiro, producer; Homem com H – Ney Matogrosso; Amabis, producer
