= 31st Brazilian Music Awards =

2024 edition of award ceremony

- Date: 12 June 2024
- Location: Theatro Municipal; Rio de Janeiro
- Hosted by: Regina Casé
- Website: premiodamusica.com.br

Television/radio coverage
- Network: Canal Brasil; YouTube

The 31st Brazilian Music Awards (Portuguese: 31.° Prêmio da Música Brasileira) were held on 12 June 2024, at the Theatro Municipal in Rio de Janeiro, to recognize the best in Brazilian music of 2023. Hosted by actress Regina Casé, the ceremony was broadcast live on Canal Brasil and the award YouTube channel. Tim Maia was honored at the ceremony.

== Winners and nominees ==
The nominees were announced on May 13, 2024. Winners are listed first and highlighted in boldface.

=== Popular song ===
Duo	Group
**Maiara & Maraisa**; Os Barões da Pisadinha; Rionegro & Solimões	**É o Tchan!**; Atitude 67; Mastruz com Leite
Interpreter – Popular Song	Interpreter – Sertanejo
**Gabriel Sater**; Edson Cordeiro; Filipe Toca; João Gomes; Léo Santana	**Roberta Miranda**; Ana Castela; Lauana Prado; Paula Fernandes; Simone Mendes
Release – Popular Song	Release – Sertanejo
**João Gomes – Raiz**; Gabriel Sater – "Nos Dias Atuais (Ao Vivo)"; Romero Ferro and Gaby Amarantos – "Em Plena Lua de Mel"	**Ana Castela – Boiadeira Internacional (Ao Vivo)**; Maiara & Maraisa – Ao Vivo em Portugal; Roberta Miranda – "Desatemos os Nós"

=== MPB ===
Group	Interpreter
**Boca Livre**; Banda Eddie; Barbatuques	**Rosa Passos**; Alaíde Costa; Jards Macalé; Jota.Pê; Wanderléa
Release	Best Song
**Jards Macalé – Coração Bifurcado**; Rosa Passos and Lula Galvão – Rosa Passos e Lula Galvão; Wanderléa – Wanderléa Canta Choros	**Jards Macalé – "Mistérios do Nosso Amor"**; Marcelo D2 – "Povo de Fé"; Wilson das Neves – "Luz do Candeeiro"

=== Urban music ===
Group	Interpreter
**Àttooxxá**; Abulidu; Natiruts	**Iza**; Gloria Groove; Ludmilla; Rincon Sapiência; Sandra de Sá
Release
**Jorge Aragão and Djonga – "Respeita"**; Jonathan Ferr – Liberdade; Ludmilla – Vilã

=== Pop/Rock ===
Group	Interpreter
**Mombojó**; Pato Fu; Sophia Chablau e Uma Enorme Perda de Tempo	**Marisa Monte**; Alice Caymmi; Ana Frango Elétrico; Filipe Catto; Zeca Baleiro
Release
**Ana Frango Elétrico – Me Chama De Gato Que Eu Sou Sua**; Filipe Catto – Belezas São Coisas Acesas por Dentro; Mahmundi – Amor Fati

=== Regional music ===
Duo	Group
**Lourenço & Lourival**; Chico Amado & Xodó; Joanina	**Falamansa**; Boi Bumbá Garantido; Timbalada
Interpreter	Release
**Alceu Valença**; Carlinhos Brown; Lia de Itamaracá; Luiz Caldas; Marcelo Jeneci	**Lia de Itamaracá – "Dorme Pretinho"**; Alceu Valença – Meu Querido São João (Ao Vivo na Fundição Progresso); Mestre Damasceno and Nativos Marajoara – Búfalo-Bumbá

=== Samba ===
Group	Interpreter
**Grupo Revelação**; Encontro das Velhas Guardas; Grupo Semente	**Xande de Pilares**; Alcione; Fabiana Cozza; Martinho da Vila; Péricles
Release
**Xande de Pilares – Xande Canta Caetano**; Marcelo D2 – Iboru; Martinho da Vila – Negra Ópera

=== Special categories ===
Electronic Release	Foreign Language Release
**Urias – Her Mind**; Tropkillaz and Sango – "Rio de Janeiro"; Ubuntu – Água Maravilha	**Anitta – Funk Generation: A Favela Love Story**; Pedro Miranda, Fernando Leitzke and Candombaile – "Candombe Bailador"; Urias – Her Mind
Classical Release	Special Project
**Orquestra Sinfônica do Estado de São Paulo – Sinfonia dos Orixás & Pequenos Funerais Cantantes**; Orquestra Ouro Preto, Cristian Badu, Maestro Rodrigo Toffolo and Gustavo Carvalho – Orquestra Ouro Preto: Haydn & Mozart; Orquestra Sinfônica Brasileira and Ignacio Garcia Vidal – Três Danças Espanholas	**João Gilberto – Relicário: João Gilberto (Ao Vivo no Sesc 1998)**; Chico César and Geraldo Azevedo – Violivoz (Ao Vivo); Wilson das Neves – Senzala e Favela
Brazilian Musician Award
**Jaques Morelenbaum**

=== Instrumental music ===
Group	Soloist
**Choro na Rua**; Banda Tributo Waldir Azevedo; Choro na Ribeira	**Armandinho Macedo**; Antonio Adolfo; Hamilton de Holanda; Romero Lubambo; Yamandu Costa
Release
**Yamandu Costa and Armandinho Macedo – Encontro das Águas**; Chico Pinheiro and Romero Lubambo – Two Brothers; Choro na Rua – Obrigado Zé da Velha

=== Other awards ===
New Artist	Audiovisual Project
**Choro na Rua**; Felipe Senna; Gabriele Leite	**Martinho da Vila and Chico César – "Acender as Velas" (Director: Philippe Rios)**; Caetano Veloso – "The Man I Love" (Director: Felipe Lion, Luqueta); Marcelo D2 – Iboru (Director: Marcelo D2 and Luiza Machado); Rubel and Bala Desejo – "Toda Beleza" (Director: TOMAT); Rubel, MC Carol, BK' and DJ Gabriel do Borel – "Put@ria!" (Director: Belle de Melo)
