= Relicário: João Gilberto (Ao Vivo no Sesc 1998) =

2023 album by João Gilberto

Live album by João Gilberto
- Released: April 26, 2023
- Recorded: April 5, 1998
- Venue: Sesc Vila Mariana, São Paulo, São Paulo, Brazil
- Genre: Bossa nova Samba; Música popular brasileira
- Length: 118:24
- Label: Selo Sesc

Relicário: João Gilberto (Ao Vivo no Sesc 1998) is a posthumous album by Brazilian musician João Gilberto released on April 26, 2023, by the SESC label.

== Background ==
On the evening of April 5, 1998, musician João Gilberto, considered one of the founders of bossa nova, performed at the SESC's Vila Mariana branch, located in the neighborhood of the same name in the city of São Paulo, for an audience of 645 people, in a concert featuring vocals and guitar. The concert was one of two performances João gave at SESC to celebrate the 40th anniversary of the album Chega de Saudade.

The concert underwent a remastering process. According to Wagner Palazzi, director of audiovisual productions at SESC, in an interview with journalist Alana Gandra of Agência Brasil, he stated that this is a project to preserve the memory of the institution and Brazilian culture, and confirmed that he had obtained authorization for the album from João's three children, and that singer Bebel Gilberto, João's middle child with singer Miúcha, was responsible for the artistic supervision of the album.

The album's release is also intended to celebrate the 25th anniversary of João's performance at SESC. The album features a previously unreleased version of the song Rei sem Coroa, which João Gilberto used to perform at concerts but had never officially recorded. The song Rei sem Coroa was composed by Herivelto Martins and Waldemar Ressurreição, inspired by the story of King Carol II of Romania, who went to live at the Copacabana Palace Hotel in Rio de Janeiro after being forced to abdicate his throne during World War II.

== Release ==
The album was released digitally on April 26, 2023. The album was later released as a double CD and a triple vinyl set.

== Reception ==
Journalist and music critic Mauro Ferreira, on his blog on G1, gave it 5 out of 5 stars. In praising the album, Ferreira stated, "Every performance by João Gilberto was always unique, like a play—extremely well-rehearsed, yet different at every show. Bossa nova was always new. [...] In short, the album is a treasured artifact of inestimable value to anyone who has always appreciated João Gilberto Prado Pereira de Oliveira, the man who made extraordinary what, in other voices and on other guitars, might have been merely trivial."

In his column in the Folha de S. Paulo newspaper, journalist Mário Sérgio Conti gave the album a positive review, writing: "'Relicário' is just that. It revives and reinterprets sambas—whether long-forgotten or well-known, sublime or cheesy—and gives them new luster and historical significance so that they speak to contemporary sensibilities, both individual and social."

The journalist and writer Luiz Felipe Carneiro described the CD as "two hours of pure auditory delight."

== Track listing ==
No.	Title	Writer(s)	Length
1.	"Violão Amigo"	Marçal, Bide	3:09
2.	"Isto Aqui O Que É ?"	Ary Barroso	3:40
3.	"Vivo Sonhando"	Tom Jobim	2:39
4.	"Nova Ilusão"	Menezes, Luiz Bittencourt	3:31
5.	"Izaura"	Herivelto Martins, Roberto Roberti	2:35
6.	"Curare"	Bororó	3:40
7.	"Doralice"	Antônio Almeida, Dorival Caymmi	2:00
8.	"Rosa Morena"	Dorival Caymmi	3:14
9.	"Aos Pés Da Cruz"	Marino Pinto, Zé Da Zilda	3:28
10.	"Louco"	Henrique De Almeida, Wilson Baptista	2:59
11.	"Pra Que Discutir Com Madame"	Ary Vidal, Janet De Almeida	4:25
12.	"Corcovado"	Tom Jobim	2:56
13.	"Retrato Em Branco E Preto"	Tom Jobim, Chico Buarque	4:29
14.	"Rei Sem Coroa"	Herivelto Martins, Waldemar Ressurreição	2:46
15.	"Preconceito"	Marino Pinto, Wilson Baptista	3:10
16.	"Saudade Da Bahia"	Dorival Caymmi	4:05
17.	"O Pato"	Jayme Silva, Neuza Teixeira	3:13
18.	"Meditação"	Tom Jobim, Newton Mendonça	3:05
19.	"Carinhoso"	João de Barro, Pixinguinha	4:16
20.	"Guacyra"	Hekel Tavares, Joracy Camargo	2:34
21.	"Solidão"	Doca, Tom Jobim	2:31
22.	"O Amor Em Paz"	Tom Jobim, Vinicius De Moraes	2:53
23.	"A Primeira Vez"	Marçal, Bide	2:43
24.	"Ave Maria No Morro"	Herivelto Martins	3:22
25.	"Bahia Com H"	Denis Brean	3:44
26.	"Samba De Uma Nota Só"	Tom Jobim, Newton Mendonça	2:20
27.	"Caminhos Cruzados"	Tom Jobim, Newton Mendonça	3:14
28.	"Lá Vem A Baiana"	Dorival Caymmi	3:31
29.	"Ave Maria"	Jayme Redondo, Vicente Paiva	2:41
30.	"Desafinado"	Tom Jobim, Newton Mendonça	4:13
31.	"Um Abraço No Bonfá"	João Gilberto	2:58
32.	"Chega de Saudade"	Tom Jobim, Vinicius De Moraes	5:19
33.	"A Valsa De Quem Não Tem Amor"	Custódio Mesquita, Ewaldo Ruy	2:19
34.	"Eu Sei que Vou Te Amar"	Tom Jobim, Vinicius De Moraes	4:29
35.	"Wave"	Tom Jobim	4:01
36.	"Este Seu Olhar"	Tom Jobim	2:36

== Awards ==
The album was nominated in the Special Project category at the 2024 Brazilian Music Awards. At a ceremony held at the Municipal Theater in Rio de Janeiro, the album was the night's winner in its category, beating out works by musicians such as Wilson das Neves, Chico César, and Geraldo Azevedo.

Year	Award	Category	Venue	Result	Ref.
2024	Brazilian Music Awards	Special Project	Municipal Theatre, Rio de Janeiro, Rio de Janeiro, Brazil	Won	
