= Xande Canta Caetano =

Xande de Pilares' 2023 album

Studio album by Xande de Pilares
- Released: August 4, 2023
- Studio: Golden Produções, Campo Grande, Rio de Janeiro, Brazil
- Genre: Samba, pagode
- Length: 34:09
- Language: Portuguese
- Label: Gold Records
- Producer: Pretinho da Serrinha

Xande de Pilares chronology
'Esse Menino Sou Eu - Ao Vivo' (2023)	Xande Canta Caetano (2023)

Xande Canta Caetano is the fifth studio album by Brazilian singer Xande de Pilares, released on August 4, 2023, by Gold Records. The album consists of reinterpretations of songs by Caetano Veloso.

== Background ==
Since 2017, Xande de Pilares had not released a studio album, following the release of Esse Menino Sou Eu through Universal Music. In an interview with journalist Valmir Moratelli from Veja magazine, Xande described Caetano Veloso as an "unreachable idol" and expressed his desire to "break paradigms between pagode and MPB." In an article for the Rio de Janeiro newspaper O Globo, the singer revealed that his first exposure to the Bahian musician was through the opening theme of the telenovela Sem Lenço, sem Documento, aired by TV Globo, which featured Veloso's classic song Alegria, Alegria.

The album was released by Gold Record on August 4, 2023, and became available on streaming platforms. In 2025, the label Três Selos released the album in vinyl format. The album features contributions from musicians Hamilton de Holanda and Gabriel Grossi, and was produced by Pretinho da Serrinha and directed by producer Paula Lavigne.

== Track listing ==
Track listing
No.	Title	Writer(s)	Length
1.	"Muito Romântico"	Caetano Veloso	3:16
2.	"Luz do Sol"	Caetano Veloso	3:44
3.	"Qualquer Coisa" (featuring Hamilton de Holanda)	Caetano Veloso	3:00
4.	"Tigresa"	Caetano Veloso	3:59
5.	"Alegria, Alegria"	Caetano Veloso	2:56
6.	"Diamante Verdadeiro" (featuring Gabriel Grossi)	Caetano Veloso	3:14
7.	"Trilhos Urbanos"	Caetano Veloso	3:12
8.	"Lua de São Jorge"	Caetano Veloso	3:01
9.	"O Amor"	Caetano Veloso, Ney Costa Santos, Vladimir Mayakovsky	3:37
10.	"Gente"	Caetano Veloso	3:55
Total length:			32:09

== Personnel ==
- Xande de Pilares – vocals
- Hamilton de Holanda – mandolin, guest vocals (track 3)
- Gabriel Grossi – harmonica (track 6)
- Pretinho da Serrinha – producer
- Paula Lavigne – musical director

== Critical reception ==
Music journalist Mauro Ferreira, in his blog on G1, gave the album a positive review, rating it four and a half stars out of five, adding that “for ears free of aesthetic ties, it will be easy to perceive the beauty that emanates from the album in which Xande de Pilares sings Caetano Veloso beyond samba and, yes, within samba." Acauam Oliveira, a professor at the Federal University of Pernambuco (UFPE), also wrote a positive review for Folha de S.Paulo and praised Xande's authenticity in relation to Caetano's work: “Xande puts Caetano's music in its place. The place that belongs to him, Xande. The path of Ogum and Iansã. With samba until morning. And a ginga on every floor."

Marcos Ramos for Quatro Cinco Um magazine adds that “Its central axis is that the album projects Caetano's work to other heights, broadening a discussion around the ways of rebuilding democracy.”

== Accolades ==
The album was nominated in two categories at the 2024 Latin Grammys, in the category of Album of the Year and Best Samba/Pagode Album. The last time a Brazilian artist was nominated in the main category was in 2021 for the work Nana, Tom, Vinicius by singer Nana Caymmi. At the ceremony held at the Kaseya Center in Miami, Xande won the statuette in the category of Best Samba/Pagode Album.

At a party held at the Municipal Theater in Rio de Janeiro, in Rio de Janeiro, Xande won the award for Best Release in the samba category of the 2024 Brazilian Music Awards.

Awards and nominations
Year	Award	Location	Category	Result	Ref.
2024	Latin Grammy Awards	Kaseya Center, Miami, United States	Album of the Year	Nominated	
2024	Latin Grammy Awards	Kaseya Center, Miami, United States	Best Samba/Pagode Album	Won	
2024	Brazilian Music Awards	Theatro Municipal do Rio de Janeiro, Rio de Janeiro, Brazil	Best Samba Release	Won	

== Tour ==
In 2024, he announced that he would go on tour with the album's repertoire. At the debut concert, held at Qualistage in Rio, Mauro Ferreira rated the show with four stars out of five, praising the singer's attitude and singing Caetano's repertoire beyond the album, with songs such as A Luz de Tieta and Desde que o samba é samba. Xande extended the tour to 2025.
