= Fabiana Cozza =

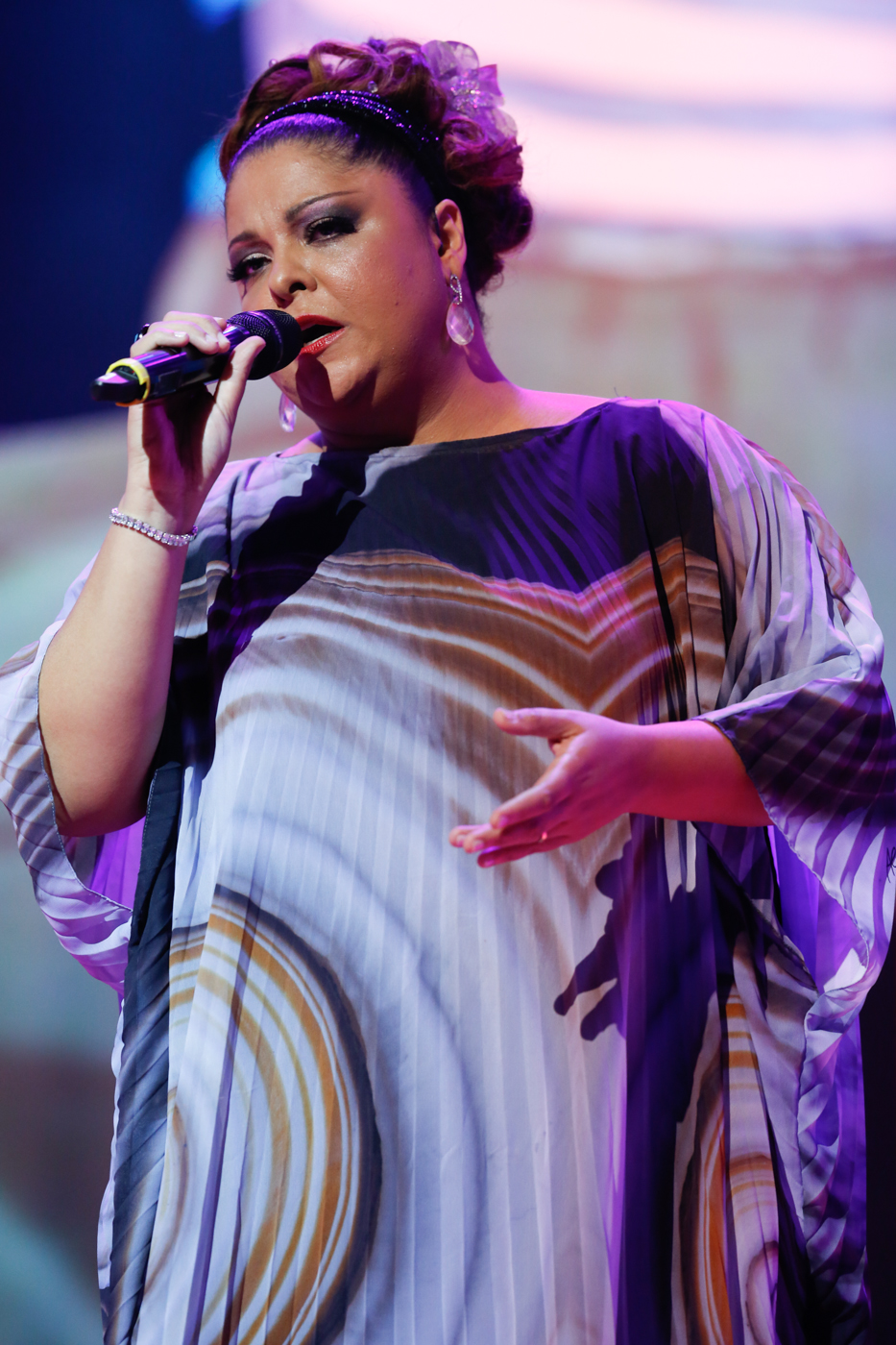
- Fabiana Cozza in 2014.

Background information
- Born: Fabiana Cozza dos Santos; 16 January 1976 (age 50); São Paulo, Brazil
- Genres: MPB, Samba
- Occupations: Singer; Writer; Researcher

Fabiana Cozza dos Santos (born 16 January 1976) is a Brazilian singer, writer, researcher, and interpreter. She is considered one of the "best of her generation" and "the best Brazilian performer of today", being compared to Elis Regina, Elizeth Cardoso, and Clara Nunes.

She began her career in the middle of the 1990s, becoming a member of group led by singer Jane Duboc. She released her first solo studio album in 2004. She has become famous for her technical rigor, dramaturgic resources and her strong live performances, which has led her to receive two awards as part of the Best of Brazilian Music awards: first in 2012 for Best Samba Singer, and in 2018 for Best Foreign Language Album. She has been nominated for other awards, such as the TIM Music Awards and the Prêmio Rival Petrobras, both in 2005. In 2024, she was nominated for the 2024 Brazilian Music Awards for best interpreter.

Cozza graduated with a degree in popular music, musical theory, and group practice by the Universidade Livre de Música Tom Jobim (now Emesp) and with a degree in journalism from the Pontifical Catholic University of São Paulo (PUC-SP), along with a master's degree in speech–language pathology from PUC-SP and is currently pursuing a doctorate in music from the State University of Campinas (Unicamp).

== Biography ==
Cozza was born in São Paulo on 16 January 1976. She is the firstborn child of one of the showmen of São Paulo-based samba school Camisa Verde e Branco, Oswaldo dos Santos, and teacher Maria Inês Cozza dos Santos. Her father has Black and Indigenous ancestry, while her mother has Italian and Portuguese ancestry. Oswaldo dos Santos is the son of a man of Black and Indigenous background and a Black woman from the city of Conquista, in the state of Minas Gerais. Fabiana's paternal grandmother always worked in the family's home, washing and selling clothes to sustain her son's studies, who would become one of the most well-known interpreters of samba-enredo in São Paulo's carnaval scene. Fabiana's mother, Maria Inês Cozza dos Santos, is of Italian and Portuguese background, whose ancestors emigrated after abolition of slavery in Brazil as the government recruited Europeans to emigrate and work on coffee plantations.

From when she was young, influenced by her father, she has been deeply influenced by samba, being baptized at Camisa Verde e Branco's headquarters. Soon after her birth, her family moved into the home of her maternal grandmother, Amélia Chiesa Cozza, in the Vila Madalena neighborhood of São Paulo. The home has since become a major center for her father's samba de roda sessions, with his colleagues coming from the Barra Funda neighborhood to play.

In this way, she began to acquire an interest in music with origins among Black populations, with her father often playing jazz and samba records. He would listen, sing, dance, and in time even brought his daughters on stage. Fabiana recognized early on the importance of music not just as something to listen to, but as an experience to relate deeply to the material on the CD. These experiences gave way to her first musical inspirations, such as jazz musicians such as Ella Fitzgerald, Billie Holiday, and Dakota Staton, as well as Brazilian musicians such as Milton Nascimento, Clementina de Jesus, Paulinho da Viola, Cartola, Almir Guineto, and Maria Bethânia.

=== Early studies ===
From four to seven years old, Cozza attended Escola Municipal Zilda de Franceschi. She would attend Escola Municipal Professor Olavo Pezzotti until the eighth grade. She grew up listening to her father, who said that studying has an immeasurable value and that it was her obligation to do so. Her mother, as a teacher, pushed her to study hard, and as a result, Cozza became a dedicated student. Cozza quickly learned the humanities, and loved when her teachers proposed reading texts for homework. Whenever the assignment was made, she would frequently hear that she "writes good for her age", but did not have a clear vision as to what she would do in the future. Her wishes to become a singer, and her developing her musical habits did not come until later. During her second and third year of secondary school, she took classes at Colégio Equipe, where she met professor José Maria Giroldo, who came to teach mathematics to her through music. To the sounds of his viola caipira, she sung a song by Milton Nascimento for the school's festivities.

=== Racial tensions ===
During primary school, Cozza attended school with middle and upper class children who lived in the Vila Beatriz and Vila Ida neighborhoods, while the lower class children lived in the old "Favela do Mangue". She has recounted the memories of girls with lighter skin walking towards the main entrance, in front of the school's construction zone, while Black girls were made to enter through the doors at the bottom of the entrance. Even as a child, experiences such as these led her to develop early on a certain sensibility with regards to racism. These experiences may have inspired her to become student council president in 8th grade as a way to defend her friends who, from 13 and 14 years old onward, had to work in order to have food on their tables, and with whom most of whom were Black and racially mixed, as she was.

=== Beginnings of musical career ===
Baptized into the Catholic Church, Cozza began her musical career performing at Igreja de Sta. Maria Madalena, located in Vila Madalena, led by padre João Bosco. It was during this time that she began to be cured of strong bouts of bronchitis that led her to spend time at the hospital. Singing improved her health substantially, due to, as she said "traversing much deeper emotional issues, and when it echoes, it frees my body from these pains in my soul." She began performing in theatre when she was twelve, writing plays in which she acted and sang. It was during this time, influenced by her upbringing, that she began to find her ancestry, and in that sense her family heritage, her devoutness towards candomblé, and her Blackness.

== Education ==
=== Journalism ===
At 18, Cozza began taking journalism courses at PUC-SP. She decided to pursue this in her last year of school, out of fear of starting a career as a singer, as her father, despite having participated in samba collectives and performing at bars since he was young, often mentioned how hard the profession was, that it was male-dominated, and, as a form of projection, claimed that she would not make money in the profession. Despite going into journalism as a ways of earning money, she would eventually take to her musical profession.

=== Universidade Livre de Música Tom Jobim ===
At 19, she was approved to enroll at the Universidade Livre de Música Tom Jobim, encouraged by someone who had been against the profession. There, she found what she described as her "enchanting paradise", with various musical projects in the same place where she could develop her artistic and musical point of view, while she also studied popular music, musical theory, and group practice. She however could not find the time that was needed to fully dedicate herself to her work, and as a result, she began failing classes, where she only graduated eight years later. She graduated alone in 2002, with only her, the director of the school, and her then boyfriend attending the ceremony. She left her career as a journalist after different forays into different forms of media.

== Musical career ==
=== Jane Duboc ===
During the second half of Cozza's studies at the Universidade Livre de Música Tom Jobim, she met the singer Jane Duboc, a singer in the group responsible for the start of her career, when she took the stage professionally for the first time at 21 years old. Two years later, in 1998, she became a member of the musical group “Notícias Dum Brasil”, at the invite of composer Eduardo Gudin. During her performances, she had the honor to work with people such as Ivan Lins, Paulinho da Viola, Elton Medeiros, Leila Pinheiro, Hermeto Pascoal, and Chico César.

=== Developments in the scene ===
While still inexperienced in her musical career, Cozza began to work in serenades and musicals, where this helped to develop the expression of her personality. Since then, she became dedicated to the improvement of her stage presence in musicals such as "Os Lusíadas" (1999), "A Luta Secreta de Maria da Encarnação" (2001), "O Canto da Guerreira - 20 anos sem Clara Nunes" and "Rainha Quelé - Tributo a Clementina de Jesus" in 2002. That year, meanwhile, she began to incorporate improvised singing, and decided to follow the advice of her father, who said that "good music was music that had went by dance, onto the street and into life". As such, she went on to start performing at a local bar called "Ó do Borogodó". During this time, she continued her technical training with professors Sira Milani, Maúde Salazar, Vânia Pajares, Felipe Abreu, and Davide Rocca.

=== Ó do Borogodó ===
Cozza worked at a bar called "Ó do Borogodó" to little success, until she encountered a journalist from Folha de S.Paulo, Luís Nassif, in October 2003. He then published an article lauding her as a promising figure who could be one of the greatest singers of her generation.

She then began to receive considerable attention due to Nassif's article. She would develop, as a recently discovered artist, a cult following, though she would only perform on Mondays. After a season with great success, Cozza left Ó do Borogodó to produce her debut studio album, “O Samba É Meu Dom" (2004). The album's name is a tribute to a song by Wilson das Neves and Paulo César Pinheiro, one of her most requested songs while at Ó do Borogodó.

=== Albums ===
"O Samba É Meu Dom" (2004), Cozza's first album, was nominated for the Prêmio Tim 2005 for "Best Samba Singer" and "Artist Revelation", as well as the "Revelation" category at Prêmio Rival Petrobras 2005. Her second album, “Quando o Céu Clarear”, was released in 2007 and was named in tribute to a song by Roque Ferreira. The album's artistic direction was done by Cozza and Marcelino Freire.

The year after, Cozza launched the DVD version of “Quando o Céu Clarear”, the result of her practicing contemporary dance and with direction made in conjunction with Jorge Balbyns. The DVD includes as participants Maria Rita and Rappin' Hood. Later on, her 2011 album, “Fabiana Cozza”, with production and direction by Paulão Sete Cordas and André Santos, brought her her first Brazilian Music Awards for “Best Samba Singer" in 2012.

After giving tribute to some of the great composers of samba in her first three albums, she made her fourth project an ode exclusively to Clara Nunes. Titled "Canto Sagrado", it was released in 2013 with her covering hits by Nunes live, such as “Tristeza Pé no Chão”, “Canto das Três Raças” and “Linha do Mar”. In 2015, Cozza released "Partir", her fifth album. In it, she maintains her identity with interpreting the biggest names of samba, but also includes music by young composers from a new generation of music, such as João Cavalcanti and Moyséis Marques.

With her sixth album, released in 2019, Cozza sings classics from one of her biggest references in samba, Dona Ivone Lara. Performing with special guests such as Maria Bethânia in “Alguém me Avisou” and Péricles in “Adeus Timidez”, the album homages in the highest terms one of the most acclaimed names in samba tupiniquim. Her latest album, "Dos Santos", is also one that serves to explore her Afro-Brazilian ancestry. Released in 2020, the album has a soundtrack characterized by its percussions and bass, along with lyrics that capture the resistance of Black people in Brazil and gives voice to Cozza's struggles and faith.

=== Non-samba works ===
Cozza, despite her success in and passion for music, has said that that alone would not satisfy her. She also has made appearances musical theatre, such as "O Canto da Guerreira"(2020), "Aquarelas de Ary Barroso", and most recently "Por Lamartine…Babo!!!". In 2017, she also began to write a book of poems, called “Álbum Duplo”.

After the work received good critical reception for her work, Cozza was invited to participate in a collection with 18 other writers, along with names such as Itamar Vieira, Jeferson Tenório, Marcelino Freire, and Nei Lopes. In the collection, titled “Contos de Axé”, she writes about the story of Xangô. Along with these, she still also commits herself to her studies, habits from which she took from her father. In 2020, she graduated with a master's degree in speech-language pathology from PUC-SP and is currently taking doctorate courses in music at Unicamp.

Cozza, while still widely considered a famous samba singer, also has always desired to expand beyond Brazil to be in contact with other Black people throughout Latin America This came into fruition through “Ay, Amor!” (2015), a piece of musical theatre in homage to the Cuban pianist Bola de Nieve, made in conjunction with Pepe Cisneros. The work received the “Best Album in a Foreign Language" award from the Brazilian Music Awards in 2018.

Along with this, she has been expanding her presence at music festivals in other parts of the world, such as Israel, Germany, France, Canada, the United States, Bulgaria, Chile, Spain, Portugal, Sweden, Cuba, Mozambique, and Cape Verde. As an extension of her work, she also developed studies and orientations for singers, actors, and people interested in discovering their artistic expression through their voice, with the “O Corpo da Voz" organization. More recently, she went on to participate at tables, workshops, symposiums, and projects about voicework, interpretation, Afro-Brazilian culture, and Black entrepreneurism and curation. She was the artistic curator for Ocupação Cartola, during Itaú Cultural 2016.

== Discography ==
- 2004 - O Samba é Meu Dom
- 2007 - Quando o Céu Clarear
- 2011 - Fabiana Cozza
- 2013 - Canto Sagrado - Ao Vivo
- 2015 - Partir
- 2017 - Ay Amor!
- 2019 - Canto da Noite na Boca do Vento
- 2020 - Dos Santos
