= Daúde Candeal =

Brazilian singer-songwriter

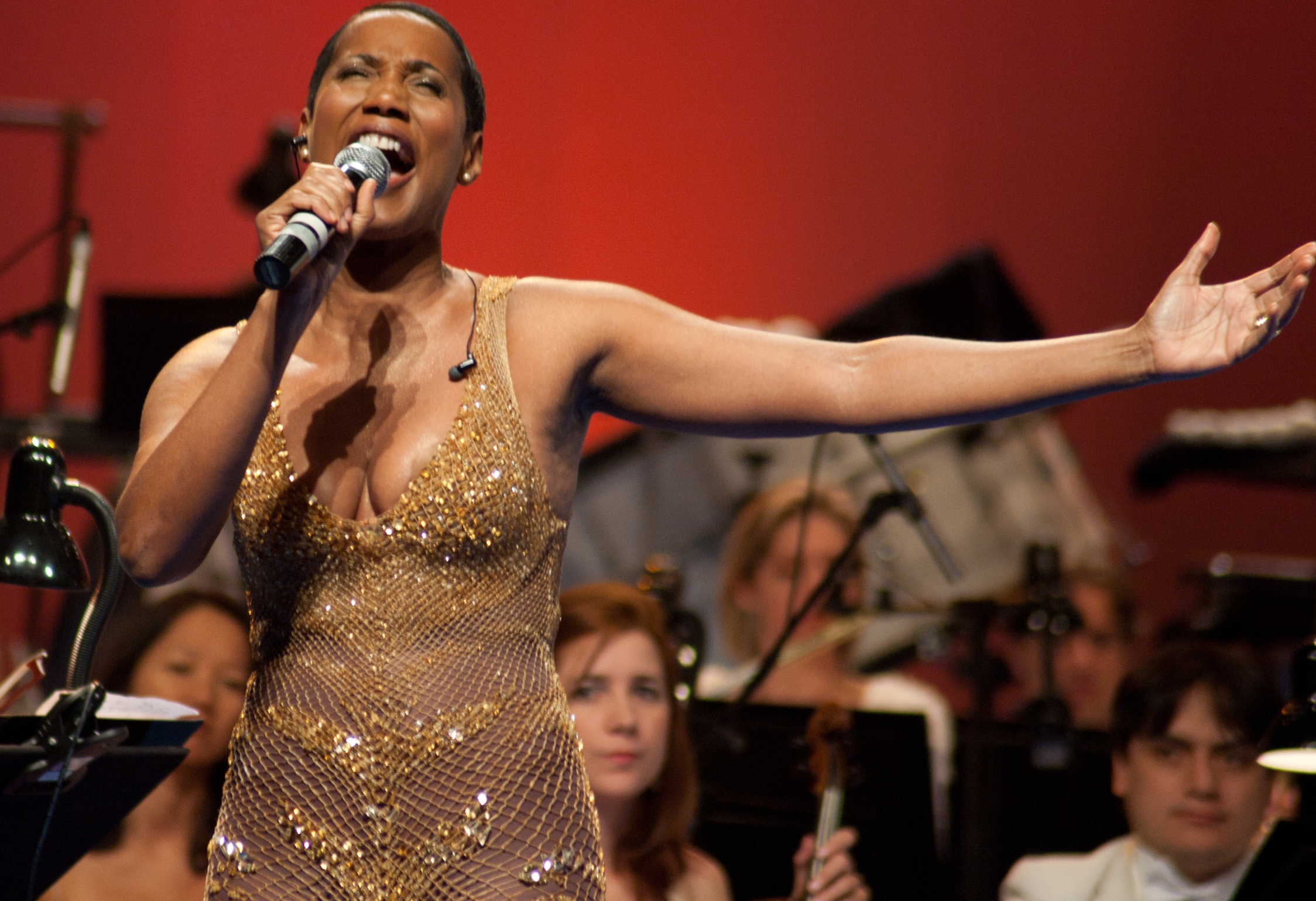
Daúde, performing in 2010.

Daúde Candeal (born 23 September 1961) or simply Daúde, is the stage name of Maria Waldelurdes Costa de Santana Dutilleux, a Brazilian singer-songwriter.

With five studio albums released, Daúde gained great notoriety and success in 1997 with her release of the Portuguese language version of the hit Pata Pata, the namesake music of the South African singer Miriam Makeba. She studied voice and theater at 18 years old, and earned degrees in Portuguese and Literature at the Universidade Santa Úrsula of Rio de Janeiro and later did a post-graduate degree in African History.

== Biography ==
She was born in Salvador, Brazil. The oldest of three siblings, Daúde lived with her family in Salvador until the age of 11, when her family moved to Rio de Janeiro. She began her Voice studies under baritone Paulo Fortes at the Instituto Villa-Lobos and studied Theatre at the Escola de Teatro Martins Penna.

Daúde began her musical career singing in plays and nightclubs, and received an invitation to record her first studio album. She recorded her first CD, Daúde, with Natasha Records in 1995. Daúde featured 13 tracks including covers of songs from artists such as Jorge Ben Jor, Carlinhos Brown, Caetano Veloso, and Lenine, mixing styles such as Funk, Soul, Hip Hop, Pop, and Samba. She received critical acclaim, winning the Sharp Awards from the APCA (São Paulo Association of Art Critics) and the Jornal do Brasil Readers' Award.

Two years later, in 1997, she released her second CD titled Daúde #2, featuring bassist Arthur Maia, multi-instrumentalist Celso Fonseca, and English producer and keyboardist Will Mowat. The album brought together influences of Samba, MPB, and Rumba, and launched Daúde to great success on the radio due to her Portuguese language interpretation of the hit Pata Pata, originally recorded by the South African singer Miram Makeba. The success of this album allowed her to tour principal Brazilian cities, and travel internationally to the United States, Europe, and Japan.

In 1999, she released Simbora, including dance remixes of earlier songs. The production fuses authentic Daúde, MPB, and electronic music, thus highlighting the importance of DJs and producers as creative partners.

Daúde was the first Brazilian signed by Peter Gabriel's Real World Records. Her 2003 album Neguinha, Te Amo honored Black women and Afro-Brazilian culture as it transcended stereotypes of Brazilian music, helping increase international attention to Brazilian music.

In 2014, Daúde released her fifth album, Código Daúde, with Lab 344 featuring high-energy covers of Brazilian standards. With a production that happened organically over the years, the album features tracks of covers of songs by Alceu Valença, Nelson Sargento and Marcos Valle.

Mixing Brazilian rhythms, Daúde has built a career taking global elements of Brazilian culture and art that blend with tributes to the roots and origins of Afro-Brazilians, in the same way that she creates her art aiming to break racist stereotypes and build new perspectives in people's minds regarding Afro-Brazilians.

== Discography ==
=== Studio albums ===
- 1995 — Daúde, Natasha Records (CD)
- 1997 — Daúde #2, Natasha Records (CD)
- 2003 — Neguinha, Te Amo, Real World Records (CD)
- 2015 — Código Daúde, Lab 344 (CD)

=== Remix Albums ===
- 1999 — Simbora, Natasha Records (CD)

== Television ==
- Fera Radical 1988 - Jacy - Rede Globo
