= Brazilian Music Awards =

Award for achievements in Brazilian music

- Current: 33rd Brazilian Music Awards
- Awarded for: Excellence in Brazilian music
- Country: Brazil
- Presented by: The Director Council of the Brazilian Music Awards
- First award: 1988; 38 years ago (as Sharp Brazilian Music Awards)
- Website: premiodamusica.com.br

Television/radio coverage
- Network: Canal Brasil (1988–present)

The Brazilian Music Awards (Brazilian Portuguese: Prêmio da Música Brasileira) (PMB) or BTG Pactual Brazilian Music Awards (Brazilian Portuguese: BTG Pactual Prêmio da Música Brasileira) is a Brazilian music award created in 1987 by Zé Maurício Machline. It is considered the biggest and most important music award in Brazil. Its goal is to value the diversity and richness of Brazilian music, recognizing artists of different genres and styles. The award seeks to highlight the contribution of musicians and composers to Brazilian culture, promoting the appreciation and recognition of talents throughout the country.

Since 1993, with the exception of 2002 and 2009, it has been held at the Theatro Municipal do Rio de Janeiro, one of the most important and traditional cultural venues in Brazil. Throughout its history, the PBM has paid tribute to great names in Brazilian music and has established itself as a prestigious event in the Brazilian cultural scene. At each edition, artists are awarded in various categories, reflecting the wide range of musical expressions present in the country.

The award was initially known by the names of its sponsors, being called Sharp Awards (Brazilian Portuguese: Prêmio Sharp), Caras Awards (Brazilian Portuguese: Prêmio Caras) and TIM Music Awards (Brazilian Portuguese: Prêmio TIM de Música). In February 2025, in the 32nd edition, the award became known as BTG Pactual Brazilian Music Awards (Brazilian Portuguese: BTG Pactual Prêmio da Música Brasileira).

The awards are the Brazilian equivalent to the Grammy Awards for music. It is one of the major awards in Brazil along with the APCA Prize for television, Grand Prize of Brazilian Cinema for motion pictures, and the Shell Theatre Prize for stage performances.

== History ==
=== Creation and early years ===
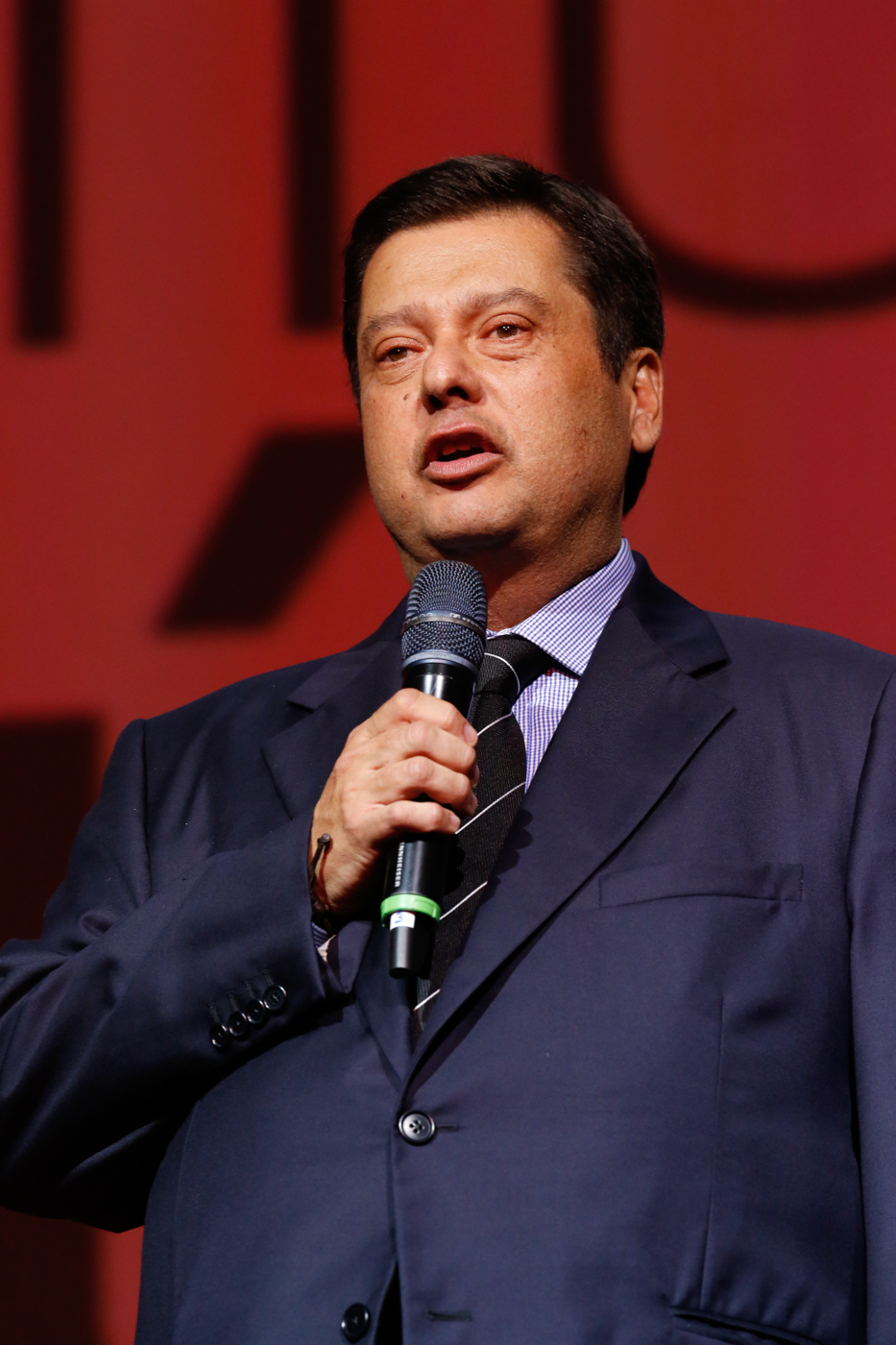
Creator José Maurício Machline during the 25th edition of the award in 2014.

The Brazilian Music Awards was conceived by José Maurício Machline, also known as Zé Maurício, in 1987. Machline, a passionate lover of music, television, theater and literature, created the award to value the diversity and richness of Brazilian music. He sought to encourage the discovery of new talent and promote productive encounters between the various trends in contemporary Brazilian music, seeking the highest quality in all musical genres.

Initially sponsored by Sharp Corporation, it was known as the Sharp Brazilian Music Awards from its first edition in 1988 (referring to the previous year, 1987) until 1998. In 1995, Sharp also created an award for excellence in Brazilian theater. However, in 1999, when the Sharp Music Awards was to be held for its 12th edition and the Sharp Theatre Awards for its 5th edition, the global economic crisis prevented the ceremony from taking place. The list of winners was released, but the winners received only a symbolic prize, without the traditional award ceremony. The award ceremony was not held in 2000 and 2001.

=== Return, new sponsorships and nomenclature ===
In 2002, the award was transformed into the Caras Awards, sponsored by Caras magazine. The following year, it became the TIM Music Awards, sponsored by the telephone operator TIM, which lasted until 2008. In 2009, the award was independently produced and had the support of the Brazilian artistic class. From that edition onwards, the award adopted the definitive name of Brazilian Music Awards. In 2010, it kept the same name, sponsored by the company Vale.

== Ceremonies ==
No.	Date	Local	City	Tribute	Ref.
Sharp Brazilian Music Awards					
1	31 May 1988	Hotel Nacional Rio	Rio de Janeiro	Vinicius de Moraes	
2	25 April 1989	Copacabana Palace Golden Room	Rio de Janeiro	Dorival Caymmi	
3	15 August 1990	Hotel Nacional Rio	Rio de Janeiro	Maysa	
4	2 July 1991	Hotel Nacional Rio	Rio de Janeiro	Elizeth Cardoso	
5	27 May 1992	Hotel Nacional Rio	Rio de Janeiro	Luiz Gonzaga	
6	19 May 1993	Theatro Municipal	Rio de Janeiro	Angela Maria; Cauby Peixoto	
7	5 May 1994	Theatro Municipal	Rio de Janeiro	Gilberto Gil	
8	3 May 1995	Theatro Municipal	Rio de Janeiro	Elis Regina	
9	7 May 1996	Theatro Municipal	Rio de Janeiro	Milton Nascimento	
10	7 May 1997	Theatro Municipal	Rio de Janeiro	Rita Lee	
11	13 May 1998	Theatro Municipal	Rio de Janeiro	Jackson do Pandeiro	
12	No awards were presented in 1999 (Note: There was no award ceremony for this edition, due to the uncertain economic scenario caused by the Samba effect.)			Maria Bethânia (Note: Maria Bethânia had been chosen as the tribute for the 12th edition. However, due to the cancellation of the award, she did not receive the honor on that occasion. Later, she was honored at the 26th edition.)	
No awards were presented (2000–2001)
Caras Brazilian Music Awards
13	21 August 2002	Villa Riso	Rio de Janeiro	Gal Costa	
TIM Brazilian Music Awards
14	23 July 2003	Theatro Municipal	Rio de Janeiro	Ary Barroso	
15	7 July 2004	Theatro Municipal	Rio de Janeiro	Lulu Santos	
16	1 June 2005	Theatro Municipal	Rio de Janeiro	Baden Powell	
17	25 July 2006	Theatro Municipal	Rio de Janeiro	Jair Rodrigues	
18	16 May 2007	Theatro Municipal	Rio de Janeiro	Zé Keti	
19	28 May 2008	Theatro Municipal	Rio de Janeiro	Dominguinhos	
Brazilian Music Awards
20	1 July 2009	Canecão	Rio de Janeiro	Clara Nunes	
21	11 August 2010	Theatro Municipal	Rio de Janeiro	Dona Ivone Lara	
22	6 July 2011	Theatro Municipal	Rio de Janeiro	Noel Rosa	
23	13 June 2012	Theatro Municipal	Rio de Janeiro	João Bosco	
24	12 June 2013	Theatro Municipal	Rio de Janeiro	Tom Jobim	
25	14 May 2014	Theatro Municipal	Rio de Janeiro	The Samba	
26	10 June 2015	Theatro Municipal	Rio de Janeiro	Maria Bethânia	
27	22 June 2016	Theatro Municipal	Rio de Janeiro	Gonzaguinha	
28	19 July 2017	Theatro Municipal	Rio de Janeiro	Ney Matogrosso	
29	15 August 2018	Theatro Municipal	Rio de Janeiro	Luiz Melodia	
No awards were presented (2019–2022)
30	31 May 2023	Theatro Municipal	Rio de Janeiro	Alcione	
31	12 June 2024	Theatro Municipal	Rio de Janeiro	Tim Maia	
BTG Pactual Brazilian Music Awards
32	4 June 2025	Theatro Municipal	Rio de Janeiro	Chitãozinho & Xororó	
33	10 June 2026	Theatro Municipal	Rio de Janeiro	Cazuza	

== Leading winners ==
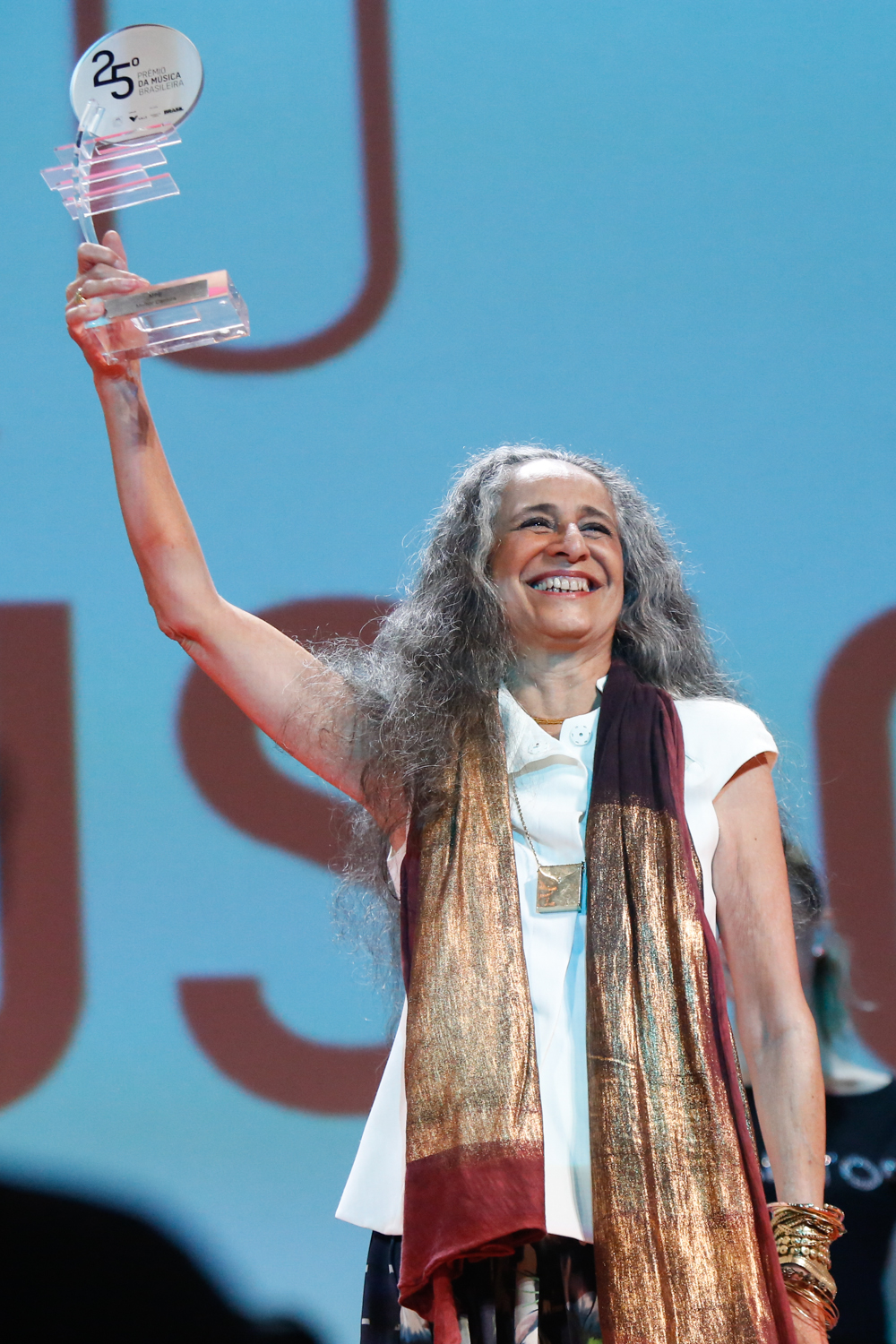
Maria Bethânia is the most awarded artist in the history of the Brazilian Music Awards.

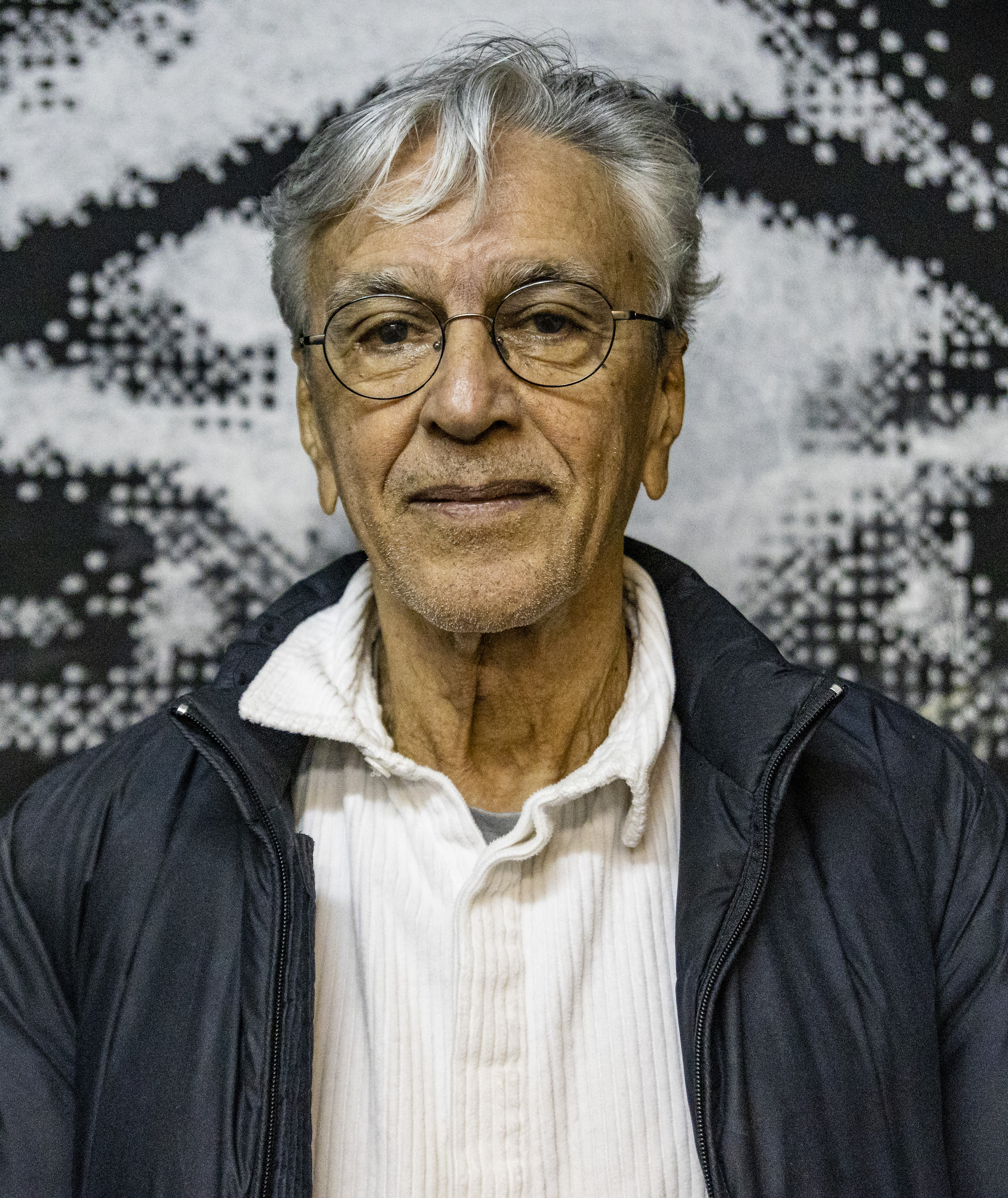
Caetano Veloso is the male artist with the highest number of awards.

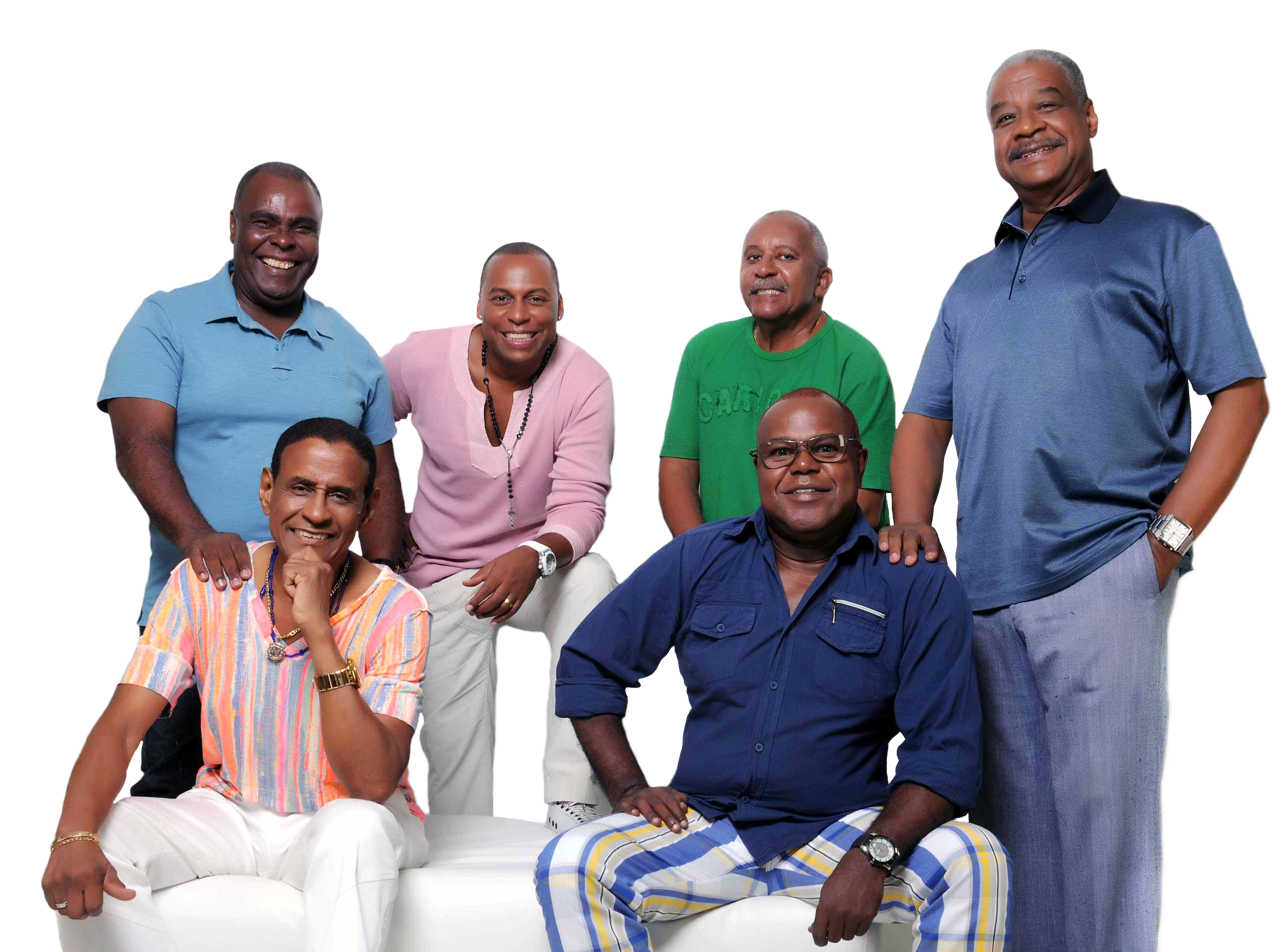
Fundo de Quintal holds the record as the band/group with the most awards won.

Artist/group	Number of awards	Ref.
Maria Bethânia	24	
Alcione	21	
Caetano Veloso	19	
Elba Ramalho	19	
Fundo de Quintal	19	
Dominguinhos	18	
Zeca Pagodinho	18	
Alceu Valença	16	
Paulinho da Viola	13	
Roupa Nova	13	
Tim Maia	13	
Gal Costa	12	
Hamilton de Holanda	12	
Lenine	12	
Milton Nascimento	12	
Rita Lee	12	
Cauby Peixoto	11	
Chico Buarque	11	
Chitãozinho & Xororó	11	
Cristovão Bastos	11	
Yamandu Costa	11	
Martinho da Vila	10	
Nana Caymmi	10	
Ney Matogrosso	10	
Roberto Carlos	10	
Sandra Sá	10	
Zélia Duncan	10	

== Categories ==
General

- New Artist
- Audiovisual Project
- Special Project
- Electronic Release
- Foreign Language Release
- Classical Release

Axé

- Artist
- Release

Funk

- Artist
- Release

Instrumental

- Artist
- Release

MPB

- Artist
- Release

Pop

- Artist
- Release

Popular Music

- Artist
- Release

Rap/Trap

- Artist
- Release

Reggae

- Artist
- Release

Rock

- Artist
- Release

Roots

- Artist
- Release

Samba

- Artist
- Release

Sertanejo

- Artist
- Release

According to the council's definition, works composed, produced or performed solely by AI, in addition to those that use vocals from dead artists created by technology, will not be able to compete for the award.

== Council ==
The Director Council of the Brazilian Music Awards (Brazilian Portuguese: Conselho Diretor do Prêmio da Música Brasileira) is responsible for establishing the fundamental guidelines of the Award, resolving doubts and omissions, selecting the jurors, and casting the deciding vote to break ties. The Board is also responsible for nominating the honoree of the year.

It is currently composed of: Antônio Carlos Miguel; Arnaldo Antunes; Djavan; Emicida; Gilberto Gil; Heloísa Guarita; João Bosco; Karol Conká; Ney Matogrosso; Wanderléa; Yamandu Costa and Zé Maurício Machline.
