= Timbalada =

Afro-Brazilian musician group

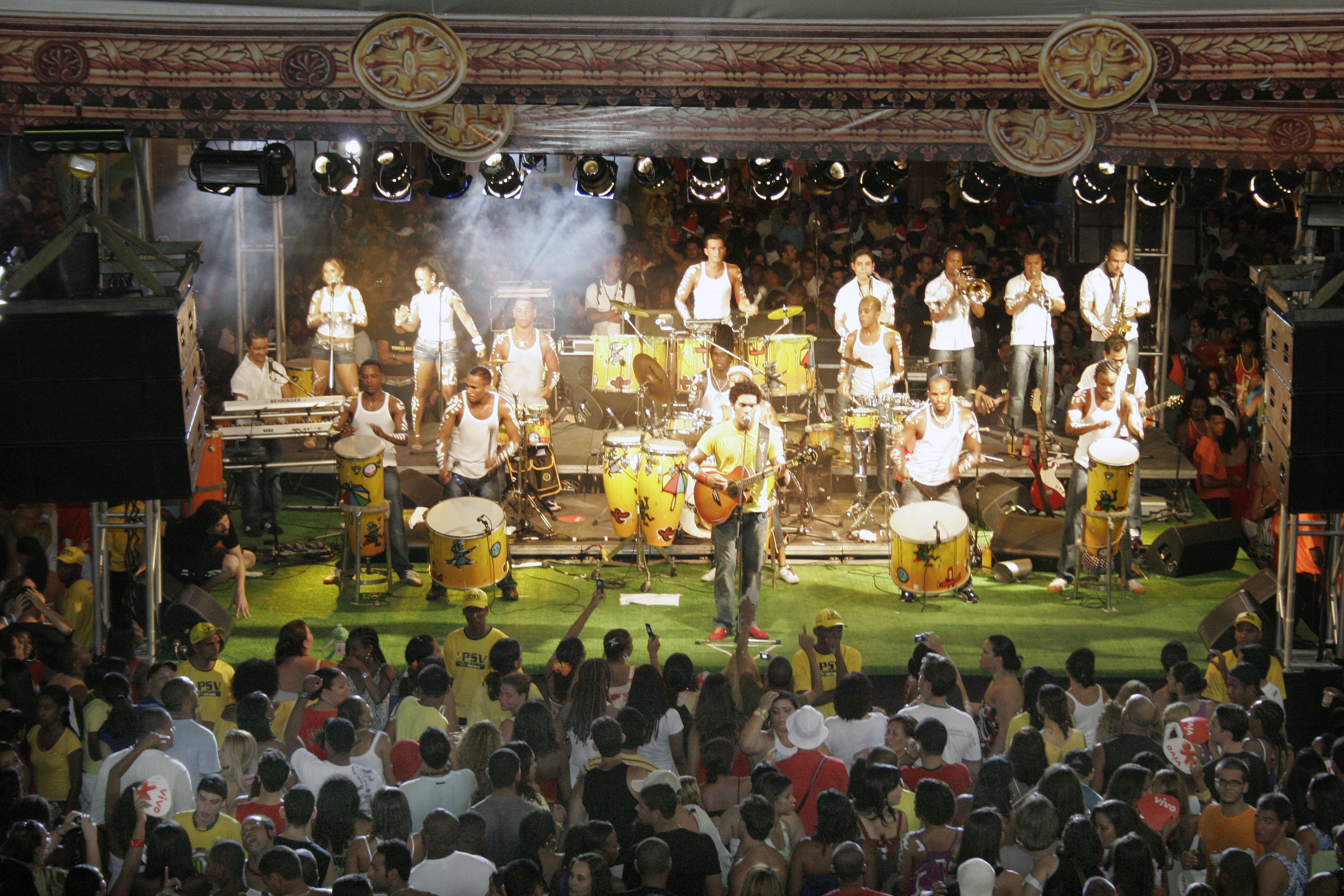

Background information
- Origin: Salvador, Bahia, Brazil
- Genres: Axé music
- Years active: 1991- present
- Website: timbaladaoficial.com

Timbalada is an Afro-Brazilian musician group from Candeal, Salvador, Brazil. It was founded by drummer Carlinhos Brown, and the composer and percussionist Tony Mola. The musical style is between samba reggae and axé, with strong influences from African music. They are a highly popular group which regularly performs sold-out concerts throughout Brazil.

The group is mostly known for its participation in the Brazilian Carnival each year in the streets of Salvador da Bahia. It also engages in social activism by working with needy children, providing education and drumming courses to help them with social integration.

They have performed at the Montreux Jazz Festival, the Holland Festival, and the Montreal International Jazz Festival, as well as tours of Europe and Japan. Their 1996 album, Mineral, won a Sharp Awards.

In October 2025, the band, under the leadership of Denny Denan and Buja Ferreira, announced a series of performances at Candyall Guetho Square, a cultural space in its hometown, Salvador, Bahia, beginning December 7.

== Musical innovation ==
Musically, Timbalada is credited with two major innovations in the instrumentation of Afro-Brazilian music: the revival of the timbal (a tall, high-pitched hand drum), and the development of a rack of 3 surdos (bass drums) that can be played by a single player. The timbal, which had been nearly extinct before Timbalada began featuring it, has since become widespread in many Afro-Brazilian genres, including axé and samba-reggae. The rack of surdos, also called a bateria-de-surdo (surdo drumset), is now widely used by many groups for stage performances when not parading. Because the bateria-de-surdo can only hold 3 surdos within arm's reach of a single player, the traditional four-surdo arrangement of many samba-reggae rhythms is often trimmed down to three.

== Discography ==
- Alegria Original (2006)
- Axe Bahia: O Melhor De Timbalada (2006)
- Serviço De Animação Popular (2004)
- Pure Brazil: Tribal Bahia – The Best of Timbalada (2004)
- Motumba Bless (2002)
- Timbalisimo (2001)
- Millennium (1999)
- ...Pense Minha Cor... (1999)
- Vamos Dar a Volta No Guetho – Ao Vivo (1998)
- Mãe de Samba (1997)
- Mineral (1996)
- Andei Road (1995)
- Cada Cabeça é um Mundo (1994)
- Timbalada (1993)

== Film appearances ==
- Pulse: A STOMP Odyssey (2002)
