= Mônica Salmaso =

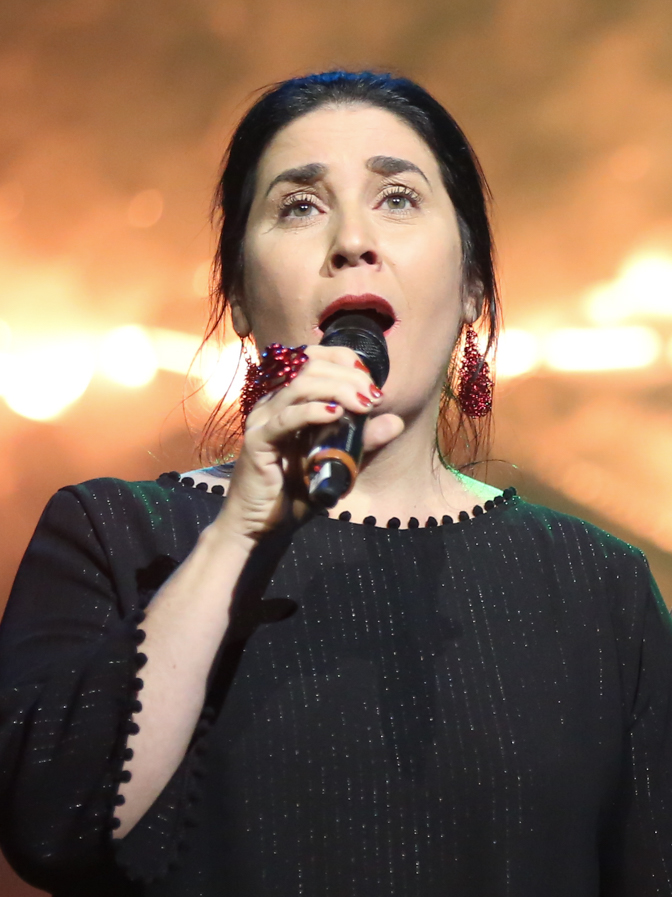
- Monica Salmaso in 2015

Background information
- Born: 27 February 1971 (age 55)
- Origin: São Paulo, Brazil
- Genre: Música popular brasileira
- Website: www.monicasalmaso.com

Mônica Salmaso (born 27 February 1971 in São Paulo, Brazil) is a música popular brasileira (MPB) singer.

== Career ==
Mônica Salmaso started her career in the play "O Concílio do Amor", directed by Gabriel Villela in 1989.

In 1995 she recorded her first solo album Afro-sambas, accompanied by classical guitarist Paulo Bellinati, who also made the arrangements and produced the CD. It was a re-recording of the eponymous album composed in the 1960s by Baden Powell and Vinícius de Moraes.

In 1996, she recorded with Paulo Bellinati the song "Felicidade" (Happiness) by Tom Jobim and Vinícius de Moraes for the album "Tom Jobim Songbook", by Lumiar Records.

She was nominated for the 1997 Sharp Awards as Revelation singer in the category música popular brasileira.

Salmaso released in 1998 her second album, Trampolim, produced by Rodolfo Stroeter, with guest participations of Naná Vasconcelos, Toninho Ferragutti and Paulo Bellinati, among others.

In 1999 she was the winner of the second Prêmio Visa MPB – Vocal Edition, in a unanimous decision both by the jury and by popular acclaim.

In the same year she recorded her third album, Voadeira, also produced by Rodolfo Stroeter. Guest participants in the CD were, among others, Marcos Suzano, Benjamim Taubkin, Toninho Ferragutti, Paulo Bellinati and Nailor Azevedo. The São Paulo Association of Art Critics (APCA) considered it one of the ten best albums of the year, and she was awarded the APCA Award as Best Female Singer.

In 2000 she was finalist of the Festival da Música Brasileira (Brazilian Music Festival) promoted by Rede Globo, main Brazilian TV broadcaster, singing "Estrela da Manhã" by Beto Furquim.

NY Times critic Jon Pareles said of her that "Monica Salmaso has a gorgeous, quintessentially Brazilian voice: quietly lustrous and sustained, suffusing each liquid note with languid secrets". Don Heckman of LA Times said "She is an artist to be watched, one with extraordinary potential". Billboard Magazine said, "Her voice is a fluent and beautifully colored instrument".

Her albums Trampolim and Voadeira were also released in Europe, Japan, the U.S., Canada and Mexico.

The 2007 album Noites de Gala, Samba na Rua, dedicated to the music of Chico Buarque, was nominated for Best MPB Album at the 2007 Latin Grammy Awards.

In 2011 the album Alma Lírica Brasileira (Lyric Brazilian Soul) was released, a work conceived in trio with her husband Teco Cardoso (saxophones and flutes) and the conductor Nelson Ayres (piano). It was nominated for Best MPB Album at the 2011 Latin Grammy Awards, and Salmaso won the 23rd Brazilian Music Awards as best singer of Brazilian Music.

In 2014, the album Corpo de Baile was released, containing 14 songs composed in partnership by Guinga and Paulo Cesar Pinheiro, several of them not recorded before and several kept for up to 40 years. With this work, Monica Salmaso won in 2015 the 26th Brazilian Music Awards, in the Best MPB Female Singer category. A song from the album, Sedutora, was also awarded with the Best Song Award.

Mônica is married to saxophonist Teco Cardoso.

== Discography ==
- Caipira – 2017
- Corpo de Baile – 2014
- Alma Lírica Brasileira – 2011
- Noites de Gala, ao vivo – 2009 (recorded 2008)
- Noites de Gala, Samba na Rua (DVD) – 2008
- Nem 1 ai – 2008 (recorded 2000)
- Noites de Gala, Samba na Rua – 2007
- Iaiá – 2004
- Voadeira – 1999
- Trampolim – 1998
- Afro-sambas – 1995

Besides these works, she also participated in more than 60 albums by other artists.
