= Osmar Milito =

Brazilian pianist and composer (1941–2024)

- Birth name: Osmar Amilcar Milito
- Born: May 27, 1941; São Paulo, Brazil
- Died: September 23, 2024 (aged 83); Rio de Janeiro, Brazil
- Occupation(s): Pianist, composer

Osmar Amilcar Milito (May 27, 1941 – September 23, 2024) was a Brazilian pianist and composer.

Milito is considered one of the greatest jazz and bossa nova pianists of all time, having worked with Brazilian artists, such as Vinícius de Morais, Gilberto Gil, Elis Regina, and international artists, such as Sarah Vaughan, Tony Bennett, Sammy Davis, Jr., among others.

Milito died in Rio de Janeiro on September 23, 2024, at the age of 83.
