= Wilson das Neves =

Brazilian musician

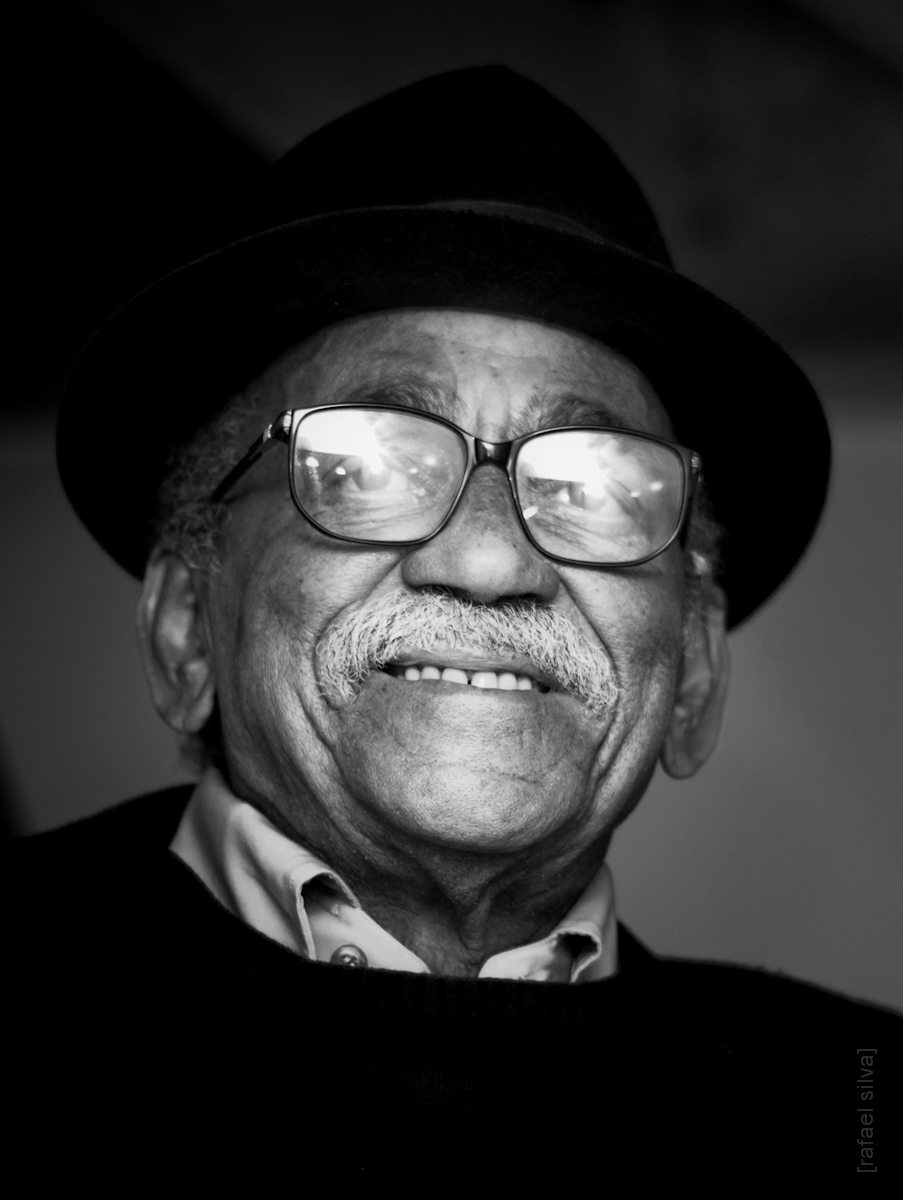

Background information
- Born: June 14, 1936; Rio de Janeiro, Brazil
- Died: August 26, 2017 (aged 81) Rio de Janeiro, Brazil
- Genres: Bossa nova; samba
- Occupations: Percussionist; singer
- Instruments: Drums; percussion; vocals
- Years active: 1950–2017

Wilson das Neves (June 14, 1936 – August 26, 2017) was a Brazilian percussionist and singer from Rio de Janeiro, Brazil. He was a key figure in the history of Brazilian music, having played with many of Brazil's greatest musicians across many decades and featured on numerous important recordings. Wilson was a very important artist specially for Brazilian popular music as a sambista, composer, and instrumentalist, with over 50 years dedicated to music. He can be heard in over 600 records from major Brazilian artists.

== Life and career ==
=== Early life ===
Das Neves grew up in Rio de Janeiro in the 1940s and by the age of 14 was already learning his trade as a percussionist, studying under Moacir Santos. At the age of 21 he went on tour with "Orquestra de Permínio Gonçalves" and in 1959 he played with the Ubirajara Silva's group. In 1962 he got a place on National Radio where he stayed for a year before being offered to play with the Orquestra Sinfônica do Theatro Municipal do Rio de Janeiro, with whom he stayed until 1964. He then worked for the TV stations, spending time at Excelsior, Globo and Rede Tupi. He also contributed to recordings by Astor Silva and the Conjunto Ed Lincoln.

=== Career ===
In 1964, Wilson das Neves recorded with Os Ipanemas, a band with Astor Silva (trombone) Marinho, Rubens Bassini (percussion) and Neco (guitar). They released only one album in the 1960s which has achieved cult status. It was released in 1964 and features a mix of bossa nova, Brazilian samba, African rhythms and jazz.

During his career das Neves worked with many great international artists including Sarah Vaughan, Toots Thielemans, Sy Oliver and Michel Legrand. In Brazil he played with key musicians from the MPB movement such as Roberto Carlos, Chico Buarque, Eumir Deodato, Elizeth Cardoso, Clara Nunes, Elza Soares, Elis Regina, Alcione and Beth Carvalho. He also appeared alongside Copinha at the Monte Carlo Casino.

Wilson das Neves released his first album in 1968 Juventude 2000 and went on to record Som Quente É o Das Neves (1969 and 1976), Samba-Tropi – Até aí Morreu Neves (1970) and his first real solo album O Som Sagrado de Wilson das Neves (1997).

=== Recently ===
Wilson das Neves recently appeared as a member of the 19 piece Gafieira Orquestra, Orquestra Imperial playing on their 2006 album Carnaval Só Ano que Vem. He also played with his former band Os Ipanemas. The band reformed in 2001 with some of the original line up and released three albums on London based Far Out Recordings The Return of The Ipanemas followed by 2003's Afro Bossa and Samba Is Our Gift (O Samba É Nosso Dom) in 2006 with another album planned for 2008.

In 2011 he released his third and praised album as a singer-songwriter named 'Pra Gente Fazer um Samba' in Brazil and Europe. He was nominated as the best singer at the 2011 Brazilian Music Awards and winner as the best Samba album.

American musician Tyler, The Creator rapped over Neves's song "Jornada" on his song "Lone" from his album Wolf, released on April 2, 2013.

In 2016, he appeared in a segment of Rio 2016 opening ceremony with Caetano Veloso, Gilberto Gil and Anitta.

== Death ==
In the later years, although still active he battled cancer. He died at Hospital da Ilha do Governador, in Rio de Janeiro.

== Discography ==
- (S/D) Juventude 2000 • LP
- (2013) Se me chamar, ô sorte • MP, B Discos/ Universal Music • CD
- (2010) Pra gente fazer mais um samba • MP, B/ Universal • CD
- (2010) Que Beleza (c/ grupo Ipanema) • Far Out (Inglaterra) • CD
- (2006) Samba de Gringo 2 (Bina & Ehud)
- (2004) Brasão de Orfeu • Selo Acari Records/Biscoito Fino • CD
- (2001) Quintal do Pagodinho • Universal Music • CD
- (2001) Brasileira • Independente • CD
- (2001) Nome sagrado-Beth Carvalho canta Nelson Cavaquinho • Jam Music • CD
- (2001) Coisa de chefe • Carioca Discos/Rob Digital • CD
- (1999) The return of The Ipanemas • Far Out (Inglaterra) • CD
- (1996) O som sagrado de Wilson das Neves • CID • CD
- (1976) O som quente é o das Neves • Underground/Copacabana • LP
- (1970) Samba Tropi-Até aí morreu Neves • Elenco/Philips • LP
- (1969) O som quente é o das Neves • Polydor • LP
- (1968) Baterista: Wilson das Neves (Elza Soares) • Odeon • LP
- (1964) Os Ipanemas • LP
