= Zeca Baleiro =

Brazilian musician

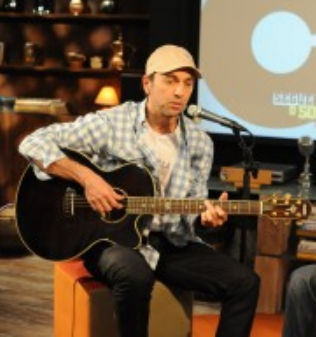

Background information
- Born: José Ribamar Coelho Santos; 11 April 1966 (age 60); São Luís, Maranhão, Brazil
- Genres: MPB; Samba; Brazilian rock
- Occupation: Musician
- Instruments: Singing, acoustic guitar
- Years active: 1997-present
- Label: Som Livre

José Ribamar Coelho Santos (born 11 April 1966), better known by his stage name Zeca Baleiro (Portuguese pronunciation: [ˈzɛkɐ baˈlejɾu]), is a Brazilian MPB artist. One of his most famous songs is "Salão de Beleza", which was featured on Putumayo World Music's Reggae Around the World compilation. Along with being a solo artist, he has also worked with guitarist Pedro Joia.

Hailing from the state of Maranhão, in northeastern Brazil, Zeca – short for José – grew up with music. He then went to a university to study Agronomy and was given the nickname "Baleiro" ("candyman"), because of his love for candy.

His first two records, Por Onde Andará Stephen Fry and Vô Imbolá, won gold status. The title track on Por Onde Andará Stephen Fry? (Where could Stephen Fry be?) was a reference to British actor Stephen Fry's flight from the stage play Cell Mates in 1995, when he disappeared from the United Kingdom after bad reviews. Zeca won the 2000 Latin Grammys for "best pop album". In 2014, his live album Calma Aí, Coração - Ao Vivo was nominated for the same award, but in the Best Música Popular Brasileira Album category, with the title song being nominated for the Best Brazilian Song category. He currently resides in São Paulo. In 2019, he received another Latin Grammy nomination for Best MPB Album, this time for O Amor no Caos. In 2021, he received another nomination in the same category, this time for the album Canções d'Além Mar. His album Ao Arrepio da Lei, in collaboration with Chico César, was included in the list of 50 best albums of 2024 by the São Paulo Art Critics Association.

== Discography ==
- Por Onde Andará Stephen Fry? (1997)
- Vô Imbolá (1999)
- Líricas (2000)
- Pet Shop Mundo Cão (2002)
- Raimundo Fagner e Zeca Baleiro (with Raimundo Fagner, 2003)
- Daqui prá lá, de lá prá cá (2003)
- Perfil (2003)
- Baladas do Asfalto e Outros Blues (2005)
- Baladas do Asfalto e Outros Blues - Ao Vivo (2006)
- Lado Z (2007)
- O Coração do Homem Bomba Vol. 1 (2008)
- O Coração do Homem Bomba Vol. 2 (2008)
- Vip Collection: Zeca Baleiro (2008)
- Concerto (2010)
- O Disco do Ano (2012)
- Lado Z Volume 2 (2012)
- Calma Aí, Coração - Ao Vivo (2014)
- Zeca Baleiro Canta Zé Ramalho: Chão de Giz Ao Vivo (2015)
- Era Domingo (2016)
- Arquivo Duetos 1 (2017)
- Arquivo Duetos 2 (2017)
- Arquivo Raridades (2018)
- O Amor no Caos Vol. 1 (2019)
- O Amor no Caos Vol. 2 (2019)
- Escória (EP, 2020)
- Canções d'Além-mar (2020)
- Raimundo Fagner & Zeca Baleiro - Ao vivo em Brasília, 2002 (with Raimundo Fagner, 2020)
- Naus (with Vinícius Cantuária, 2022)
- Zeca Baleiro Ilumina Sonastério (EP, 2022)
- Mambo Só (2023)
- O Samba Não É de Ninguém (2023)
