= Angela Maria =

Brazilian singer and actress (1929–2018)

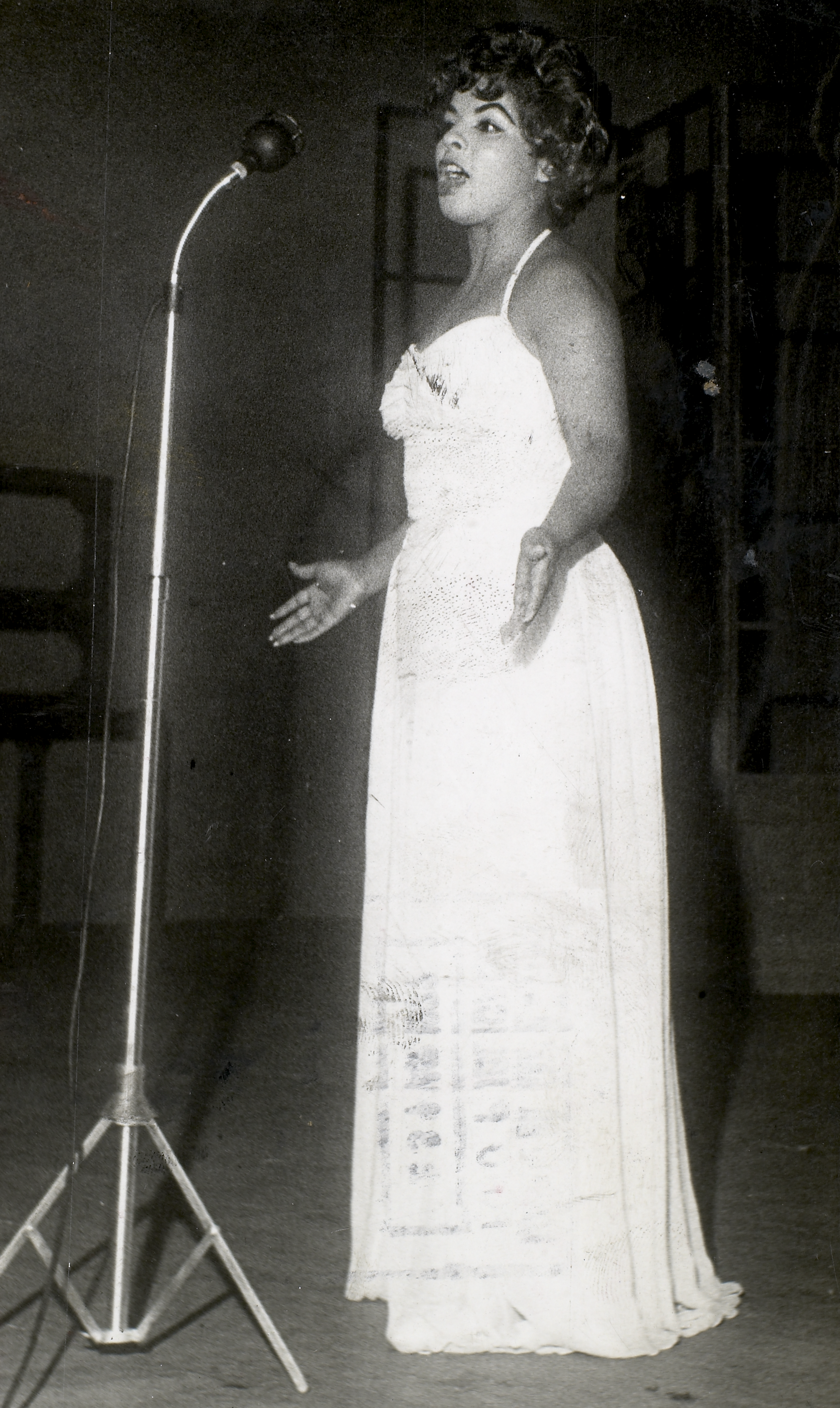

Background information
- Born: Abelim Maria da Cunha; 13 May 1929; Macaé, Rio de Janeiro, Brazil
- Died: 29 September 2018 (aged 89) São Paulo, São Paulo, Brazil
- Genres: Samba, MPB
- Occupations: Singer, actress
- Instrument: Vocals
- Years active: 1949–2018
- Labels: Columbia; RCA Victor; Discos Copacabana; Discos Beverly; Discos Continental; Selo Continental; Chantecler; EMI-Odeon; EMI Jangada; Discos CBS; Sony BMG; Sony Music; Universal Music; EMI Music
- Website: angelamaria.com.br

Angela Maria (13 May 1929 – 29 September 2018), the stage name of Abelim Maria da Cunha, was a Brazilian singer and actress. She was elected "Queen of the Radio" in 1954 and was considered the most popular singer of that decade in Brazil.

== Discography ==
- 1955 – A Rainha Canta
- 1956 – Sucessos de Ontem na Voz de Hoje
- 1956 – Angela Maria Apresenta
- 1957 – Quando Os Maestros Se Encontram Com Angela Maria
- 1958 – Para Você Ouvir e Dançar
- 1962 – Incomparável
- 1962 – Canta Para o Mundo
- 1965 – Boneca
- 1969 – Quando a Noite Vem
- 1969 – Angela em Tempo Jovem
- 1970 – Angela de Todos os Temas
- 1975 – Angela
- 1980 – Apenas Mulher
- 1982 – Estrelas da Canção
- 1984 – Sempre Angela
- 1985 – Angela Maria
- 1987 – Angela Maria
- 1996 – Amigos
- 1997 – Pela Saudade Que Me Invade: Tributo A Dalva de Oliveira
- 2006 – Não Tenho Você

== Filmography ==
- 1954 – Rua Sem Sol .... guest actress
- 1955 – O Rei do Movimento
- 1956 – Fuzileiro do Amor
- 1956 – Com Água na Boca
- 1956 – Fugitivos da Vida
- 1956 – O Feijão é Nosso
- 1956 – Tira a mão daí!
- 1957 – Rio, Zona Norte
- 1957 – Feitiço do Amazonas
- 1957 – Metido a Bacana
- 1957 – O Negócio Foi Assim
- 1957 – O Samba na Vila
- 1957 – Rio Fantasia
- 1959 – Quem Roubou Meu Samba?
- 1959 – Dorinha no Society
- 1961 – América de Noite
- 1961 – Caminho da Esperança
- 1966 – 007 1/2 no Carnaval
- 1967 – Carnaval Barra Limpa
- 1973 – Portugal...Minha Saudade
- 1975 – A Extorsão
