= Lenine (musician) =

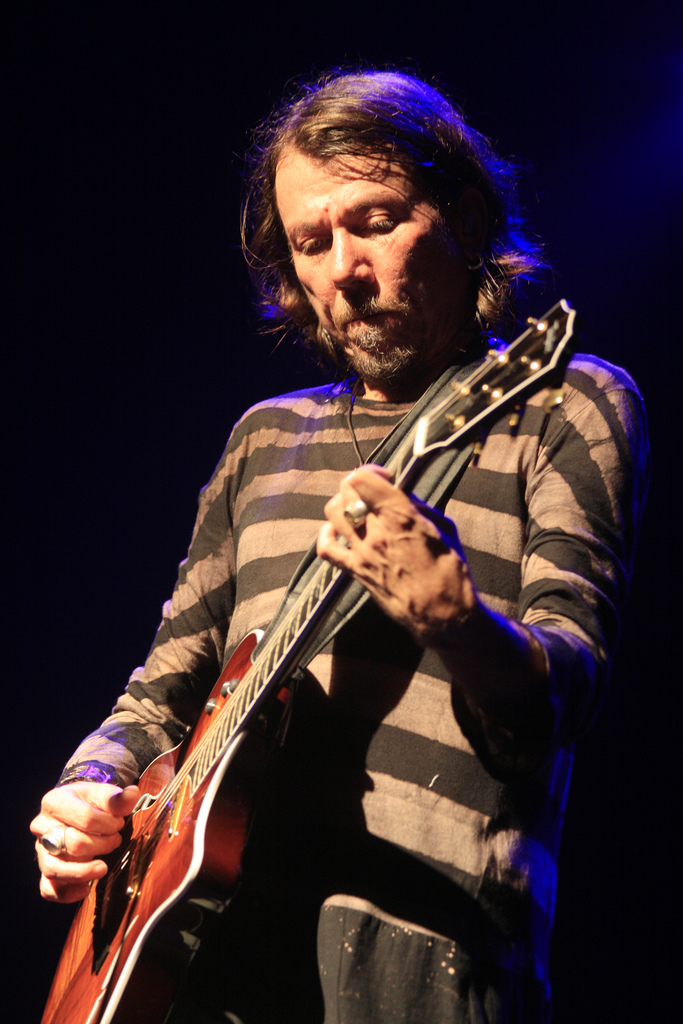
- Lenine

Background information
- Born: Osvaldo Lenine Macedo Pimentel; 2 February 1959 (age 67); Recife, Pernambuco Brazil
- Genres: MPB; Alternative rock Brazilian rock Blues; Samba; Manguebeat; Frevo; Maracatu; Adult contemporary Pop; Pop rock Soft rock
- Occupations: Musician, songwriter, producer
- Instruments: Vocals, guitar, violin
- Years active: 1982–present
- Labels: Six Degrees Records, Sony Music, Som Livre, Universal Music
- Website: Lenine.com

Lenine, artist name of Osvaldo Lenine Macedo Pimentel (born 2 February 1959), is a Brazilian singer-songwriter from Recife, Pernambuco. Between the years of 2002 and 2018, he has earned a total of seven Latin Grammy Awards, (including the 2005 awards for "Best Brazilian Contemporary Album" and "Best Brazilian Song").

== Career ==
Lenine's career began at the age of 18, when he moved to Rio de Janeiro to compete in a music festival. In 1983, he released his first LP, Baque Solto, with partner Lula Queiroga. Ten years later, he released his second album, Olho de Peixe, with percussionist Marcos Suzano. Lenine's first solo record, O Dia em que Faremos Contato, was released in 1997, featuring a mixture of electronica, northeastern Brazilian rhythms and samba. Two years later, he released Na Pressão. In 2001, Falange Canibal was released. This album attracted international attention due to the appearance of the U.S. group Living Colour performing with him on the song "O Homem dos Olhos de Raios-X". His next album In Cité (2004) was recorded live at the auditorium of the Cité de la Musique (City of Music) in Paris.

In 2005, Lenine won two Latin Grammys: one for "Best Brazilian Contemporary Album" and one for "Best Brazilian Song". His first North American release, a self-titled collection of his own compositions, was issued in 2006.

In addition to being a performer of note, Lenine is an accomplished composer for other artists; he possesses a catalog of over 500 songs written for artists including Maria Bethânia, Milton Nascimento, Daniela Mercury, and Zélia Duncan. Among Lenine's most famous songs is "Relampiano" (lightning strikes), about a child from the favela who sells candies at stoplights. This song, written with Paulinho Moska, was inspired by an encounter between them and a young street vendor in Rio de Janeiro.

In 2015, his album Carbono was nominated for the 16th Latin Grammy Awards in the Best MPB Album category, with the track "Simples Assim" being nominated for the Best Brazilian Song category.

His live album Em Trânsito was ranked as the 26th best Brazilian album of 2018 by the Brazilian edition of Rolling Stone magazine.

== Discography ==
- 1983—Baque Solto (with Lula Queiroga)
- 1993—Olho de Peixe (with Marcos Suzano)
- 1997—O Dia em que Faremos Contato
- 1999—Na Pressão
- 2001—Falange Canibal
- 2004—In Cité (live album)
- 2006—Lenine Acústico MTV (live album)
- 2007—Breu
- 2008—Labiata (Wrasse Records; UK)
- 2011—Chão
- 2013—Triz
- 2015—Carbono
- 2016—The Bridge (live at Bimhuis; with Martin Fondse Orchestra; live album)
- 2018—Em Trânsito (live album)
- 2021—The Bridge II (with Martin Fondse; mini album)
