= Canal Brasil =

- Type: Pay television
- Country: Brazil
- Headquarters: Rio de Janeiro

Programming
- Language: Portuguese
- Picture format: HDTV 1080i (downscaled to 480i for the SD feed)

Ownership
- Owner: Grupo Globo

History
- Launched: September 18, 1998; 27 years ago

Links
- Webcast: globoplay.globo.com (subscription required)

Canal Brasil is a Brazilian subscription TV channel with programming focused on the country's audiovisual productions.

It's the result of an association of Grupo Globo's cable TV division Canais Globo with the company Grupo Consórcio Brasil (GCB), formed by Luiz Carlos Barreto, Zelito Vianna, Marco Altberg, Roberto Farias, Anibal Massaini Neto, Patrick Siaretta, André Saddy and Paulo Mendonça.

== History ==
The channel premiered on September 18, 1998, with the exhibition of the film Sonho sem fim (Dream Without End), by Lauro Escorel, and was developed based on Decree 2206, of 1997, which required all Brazilian cable TV service providers to include in their programming at least one channel with 12 daily hours dedicated to "Brazilian cinematographic and audiovisual works of independent production.

== Hosts and programs ==
Some of Canal Brasil's hosts and shows are, or were Paulo Tiefenthaler (Larica Total), Lázaro Ramos (Espelho), Michel Melamed (Bipolar Show), Charles Gavin (O Som do Vinil), Roberta Sá (Faixa Musical), João Gordo (Eletrogordo), Nasi (Nasi Noite Adentro), Nicole Puzzi (Pornolândia), André Abujamra (Abuzando), Zé Nogueira (Estúdio 66), Tárik de Souza (MPBambas), José Mojica Marins (O Estranho Mundo de Zé do Caixão), Simone Zuccolotto (CineJornal and Sessão Interativa), Angela Ro Ro (Escândalo), among others.

== Awards ==
Canal Brasil promotes the Canal Brasil Acquisition Award, which gives R$15,000 to the short films that won in the most representative film festivals in the country, in addition to showing the film during programming. Since 2006, it has also held the Canal Brasil Short Film Grand Prix, which awards R$50,000 to the best short film among the 10 winners of the previous year's Canal Brasil Acquisition Prize. A jury made up of presenters from the channel chooses the grand prize winner by secret ballot.

== Original Productions ==
Canal Brasil has participated co-producing films and series with independent filmmakers, including films.

- Neon Bull
- Gabriel and the Mountain
- Loveling
- Bacurau
- The Invisible Life of Eurídice Gusmão.
- The Traitor
