= Alcione Nazareth =

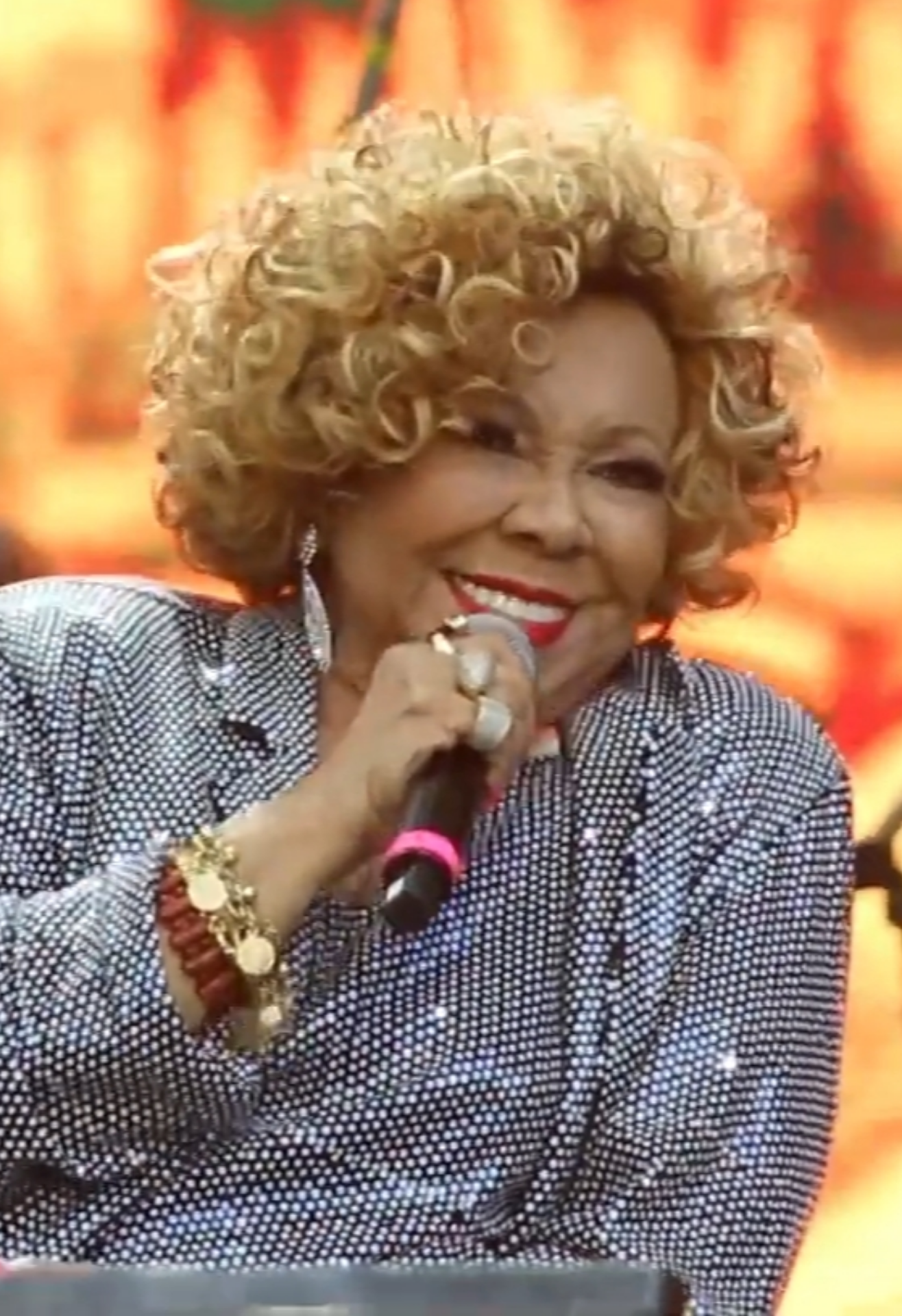
- Alcione in 2023

Background information
- Born: Alcione Dias Nazareth; November 21, 1947 (age 78); São Luís, Maranhão, Brazil
- Genre: Samba
- Occupations: Singer; songwriter; composer
- Instruments: Vocals; trumpet; clarinet
- Years active: 1975–present

Alcione Dias Nazareth (Brazilian Portuguese: [awsiˈoni ˈdʒi.ɐz nazaˈɾɛ]; born November 21, 1947) is also known mononymously as Alcione or as A Marrom ("The Brown Lady"), is a Brazilian samba singer. She first gained international recognition in the late 1970 and has had nineteen gold records, as well as five platinum and double platinum records. She is the second most awarded artist in the history of the Brazilian Music Awards.

In 1987, she dedicated the song João de Deus (John of God) to Pope John Paul II and 500,000 people during his second visit to Brazil.

== Biography ==
She was born in São Luís, Maranhão. Her father was a military musician who worked as the conductor of the corps marching band. Alcione was introduced to traditional Brazilian music by her father. At the age of thirteen, she was already performing at college parties. At the same time, she began studying the clarinet and the trumpet.

At age 20, Alcione moved to Rio de Janeiro. There, she worked at the city's TV Excelsior and later went on tour in Argentina and Chile for four months. After returning to Brazil, she settled in São Paulo, working in nightclubs and making appearances on television. In 1970, she started her two-year tour in Europe, performing as a vocalist and a trumpet player.

In 1972, when back in Brazil, Alcione recorded her first single. The following year, she traveled to sing in Mexico and, in 1974, Portugal, where she recorded her first full-length album. In 1975, Alcione released her LP, A Voz do Samba, which achieved gold sales status and featured several hit tracks. The most successful songs were "Não Deixe o Samba Morrer", written by Edson and Aloiso, and "O Surdo", written by Totonho and Paulinho Resende.

In the late 1970s, Alcione became well known as a samba artist and achieved international recognition. She recorded Alerta Geral for Philips Records and, in 1978, released this album—the title of which was taken from a television show that Alcione had hosted on TV Globo for two years. Following its success, Alcione continued to release several other full-length albums in late 1970s and early 1980s, including her self-titled album.

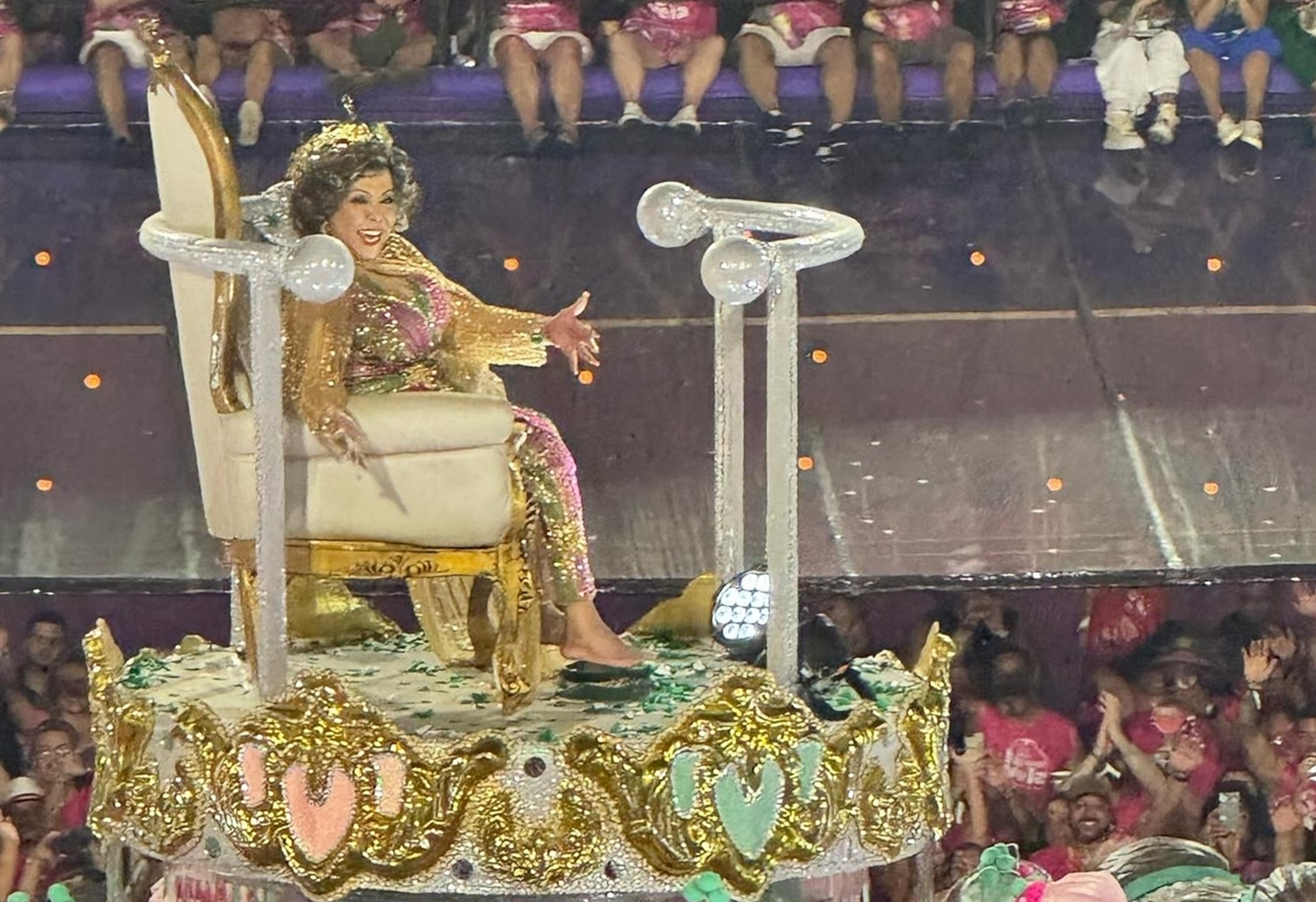
Alcione in the 2024 Carnival in Rio de Janeiro parade, in her honor.

In 1997, Alcione signed with Universal Records, subsequently releasing a debut album titled, Valeu, through Polygram the next year. This was followed by Celebração that same year, and Claridade---Uma Homenagem A Clara Nunes in 1999. In December 2002, Alcione was recognized for playing an important part in founding the Paraíso School of Samba in London, England. She also helped organize and prepare the stage for a British version of the Carnival Brasil, Paraíso dos Orixás (Brazil, Paradise of the Orishas). Her 2002 album, Ao Vivo, received the Best Samba/Pagode Album Award at the fourth Latin Grammy Award ceremony in 2003.

She has had several hits, such as "Não deixe o samba morrer", "Lá vem você", "Gostoso veneno", and "Ilha da maré".

On July 7, 2007 she performed at the Brazilian leg of Live Earth in Rio de Janeiro.

== Discography ==
=== Universal Music / Philips ===
- A Voz do Samba (1975) (100,000 - Gold)
- Morte de um poeta (1976)
- Pra que chorar (1977) (400,000 - Platinum)
- Alerta geral (1978)
- Gostoso veneno (1979)
- E vamos à luta (1980)
- Alcione (1981)
- Dez anos depois (1982)

=== Sony BMG / RCA ===
- Vamos arrepiar (1982)
- Almas e corações (1983)
- Da cor do Brasil (1984) (100,000 - Gold)
- Fogo da vida (1985) (100,000 - Gold)
- Fruto e raiz (1986) (700,000 - Platinum)
- Nosso nome: resistência (1987) (250,000 - Platinum)
- Ouro & Cobre (1988) (100,000 - Gold)
- Simplesmente Marrom (1989) (100,000 - Gold)
- Emoções Reais (1990)
- Promessa (1991)
- Pulsa, coração (1992) (100,000 - Gold)
- Brasil de Oliveira da Silva do Samba (1994) (100,000 - Gold)
- Profissão: Cantora (1995)
- Tempo de Guarnicê (1996)

=== Universal Music / Polygram ===
- Valeu - Uma Homenagem à Nova Geração do Samba (1997) (100,000 - Gold)
- Celebração (1998) (100,000 - Gold)
- Claridade (1999) (100,000 - Gold)
- Nos Bares da Vida (2000) - ao vivo (250,000 - Platinum)
- A Paixão tem Memória (2001) (100,000 - Gold)

=== Indie Records ===
- Ao Vivo (2002) (250,000 - Platina)
- Ao Vivo 2 (2003) (250,000 - Platina)
- Faz Uma Loucura por Mim (2004) (250,000 - Platina)
- Faz Uma Loucura por Mim - Ao Vivo (2005) (100,000 - Gold)
- Alcione e Amigos (2005)
- Uma Nova Paixão (2005) (100,000 - Gold)
- Uma Nova Paixão - Ao Vivo (2006) (50,000 - Gold)
- Coleções - Grandes Sucessos de Alcione (2007)
- De Tudo Que eu Gosto (2007)
- Raridades (2008)
- Acesa (2009) (30,000)
- Acesa - Ao Vivo em São Luiz do Maranhão (2009) (20,000)
- Duas Faces - Jam Session (2011, October 28, on "HSBC Brasil") (20,000)
- Duas Faces: Ao Vivo na Mangueira (2012) (20,000)
- Eterna Alegria (2013) (8,000)
- Eterna Alegria - Ao Vivo (2014) (5,000)
