= Chico César =

Brazilian musician (born 1964)

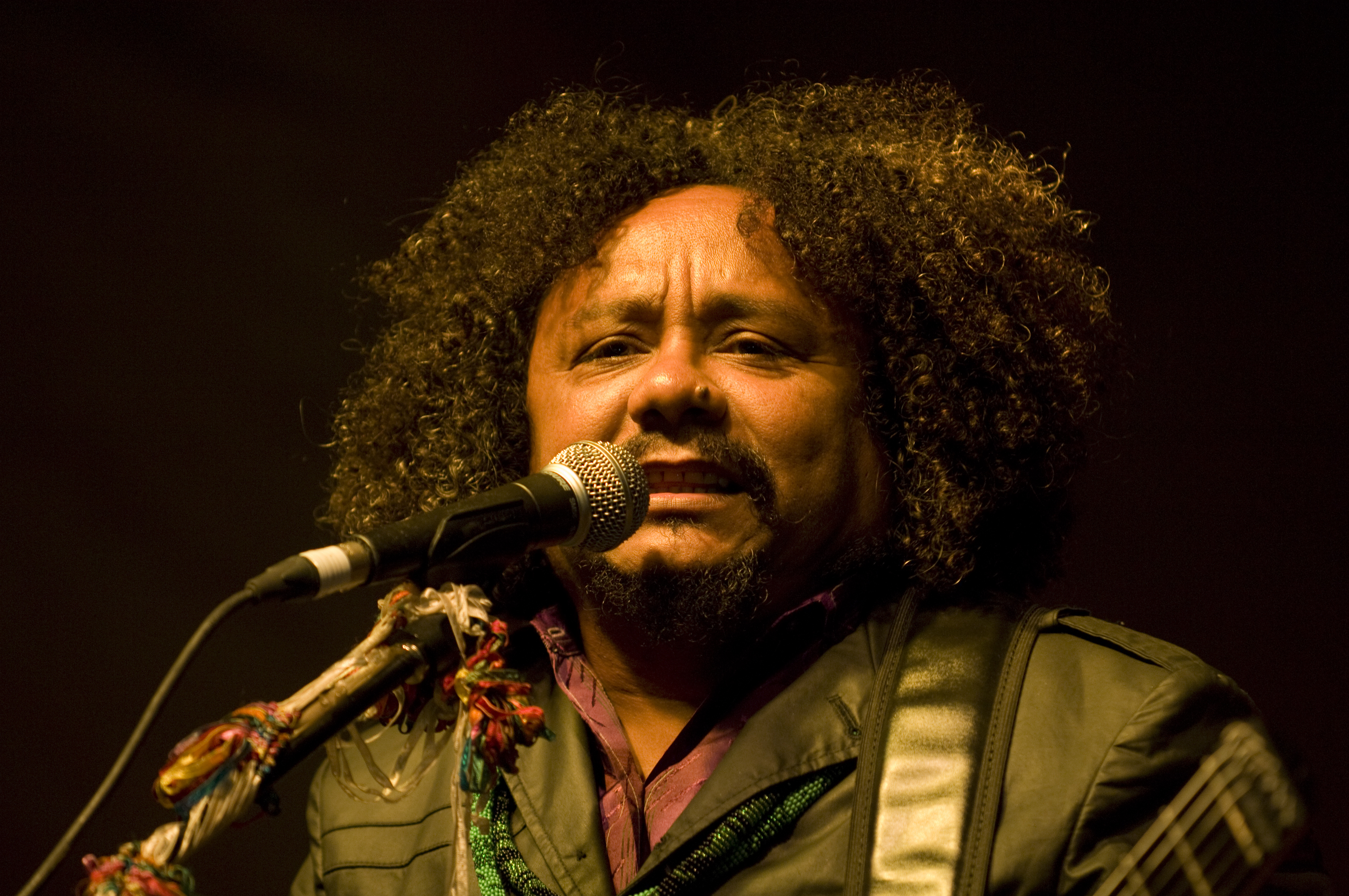
- César in 2013

Background information
- Born: Francisco César Gonçalves; January 26, 1964 (age 62)
- Origin: Catolé do Rocha, PB, Brazil
- Genres: Avant-garde, symphonic, folk, fusion, world, MPB, reggae, forró, frevo
- Occupations: Singer-songwriter, musician, writer, poet, journalist, politician(Culture Office of Paraiba)
- Instruments: Voice, Guitar, Acoustic Guitar, Northeastern Zither, Berimbau
- Years active: 1991 – present

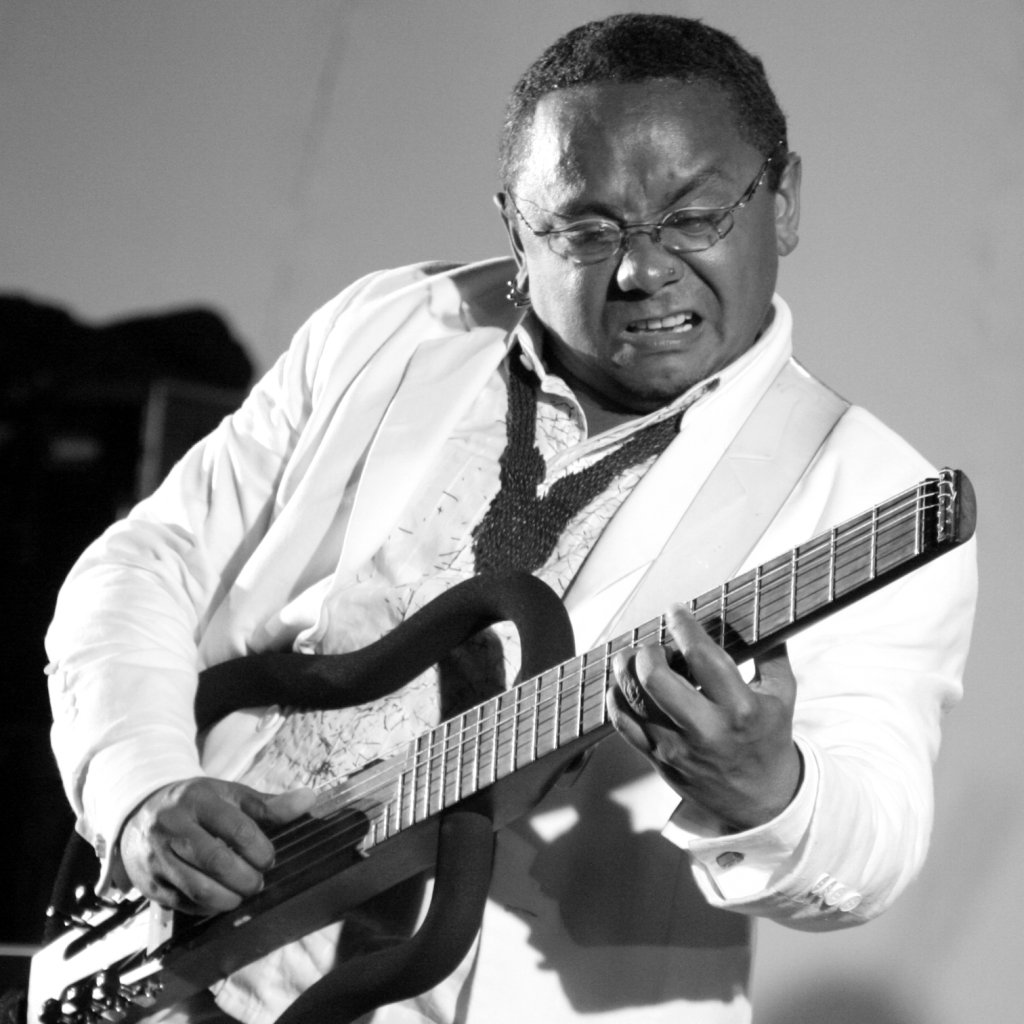
Chico César

Chico César (born January 26, 1964, in Catolé do Rocha, Paraíba, Brazil) is a Brazilian singer, poet, composer and songwriter.

== Early years and career ==
Born in Catolé do Rocha, Paraíba, Brazil, he was transferred to João Pessoa, where he studied journalism at Universidade Federal da Paraíba, where he wrote poetry.

Chico César is a composer/interpreter revealed in 1995. His compositions are a mix of social criticism and humor, with strong musical influences of the folklore of the northeast, having been recorded by artists like Elba Ramalho, Daniela Mercury, Zizi Possi, Emílio Santiago, and the Argentinean Pedro Aznar. Maria Bethânia chose his song "A Força que Nunca Seca" as the title track of one of her CDs. César has recorded four CDs so far and has been touring internationally since 1995.

He began to work at a record shop at eight. In the following year, he began to play in the band Super Som Mirim. At 16, he moved to João Pessoa for his high school studies, focusing on journalism and, at the same time, playing in the group Jaguaribe Carne, which worked with vanguard poetry. At 21, he moved to São Paulo, soon becoming acquainted with members of the vanguarda paulista (São Paulo's vanguard) musicians like Arrigo Barnabé and Itamar Assumpção. While working at a daily gig as a journalist, he continued to improve his violão playing and compositions, realizing live performances and beginning to gather a faithful fan audience. In 1991, he went to Europe where performed with success in Germany. Upon returning, he decided to abandon journalism and dedicate himself exclusively to music. Forming the band Cuscuz Clã (a pun with the hated anti-Negro organization), he recorded the CD Aos Vivos in 1995, produced independently, and later sold to Velas, where he accompanied himself on the violão at a live recorded show. The album had as guest stars Lenine and Larry Goldin (recovered from ostracism, after an important contribution to Tropicalia). "Mama África" and "À Primeira Vista" became hits, and when Daniela Mercury recorded the latter in an interpretation that was included in the major soap opera Rei do Gado, his fame was solidified. The success of critique came in 1996, with Cuscuz Clã (MZA/Polygram), which granted him the Sharp Awards as Revelation (1995) and APCA's as Best Composer. The clip "Mama África" received the Prêmio MTV Music Awards as Best 1996 MPB VideoClip como Melhor VideoClip. "À Primeira Vista" won the Best Song prize of the Troféu Imprensa (SBT) and was included in a CD by Argentinean star Pedro Aznar. Lokua Kanza, Dominguinhos, Arrigo Barnabé, and Paulo Moura, among others, participated on his third album, Beleza Mano, and in 2000, he released a fourth, Mama Mundi. Having new partnerships in songs with his old idolLokua Kanza, César toured Europe six times in 2000, performing for the second time at the Montreux Festival (Switzerland). ~ Alvaro Neder, Rovi

His album O Amor É um Ato Revolucionário was considered one of the 25 best Brazilian albums of the second half of 2019 by the São Paulo Association of Art Critics.

In January 2022, he released a single with Lala Garin, "Vermelho Esperança", written by him and taken off the soundtrack for the theater play A hora da estrela – O canto de Macabéa, which happened in 2020 and was inspired by Clarice Lispector's Hour of the Star.

Post Luiz Inacio Lula da Silva's 2022 election victory, the Worker's Party (PT) listed César as one of the potential names to govern in Lula's new government, as the Minister for Culture. Despite past experience as Paraíba's secretary of Culture in 2011, César expressed on social media that he prefers to see either Juca Ferreira or Jandira Feghali in charge of the ministry instead.

His album Ao Arrepio da Lei, in collaboration with Zeca Baleiro, was included in the list of 50 best albums of 2024 by the São Paulo Art Critics Association.

== Albums ==
- Aos Vivos (1995)
- Cuzcuz-Clã (1996)
- Beleza Mano (1997)
- Mama Mundi (2000)
- Respeitem meus cabelos, brancos (2002)
- De uns tempos pra cá (2006)
- Francisco, forró y frevo (2008)
- Estado de Poesia (2015)
- O Amor é um Ato Revolucinário (2019)
- Vestido de Amor (2022)
