= Edy Star =

Brazilian singer-songwriter (1938–2025)

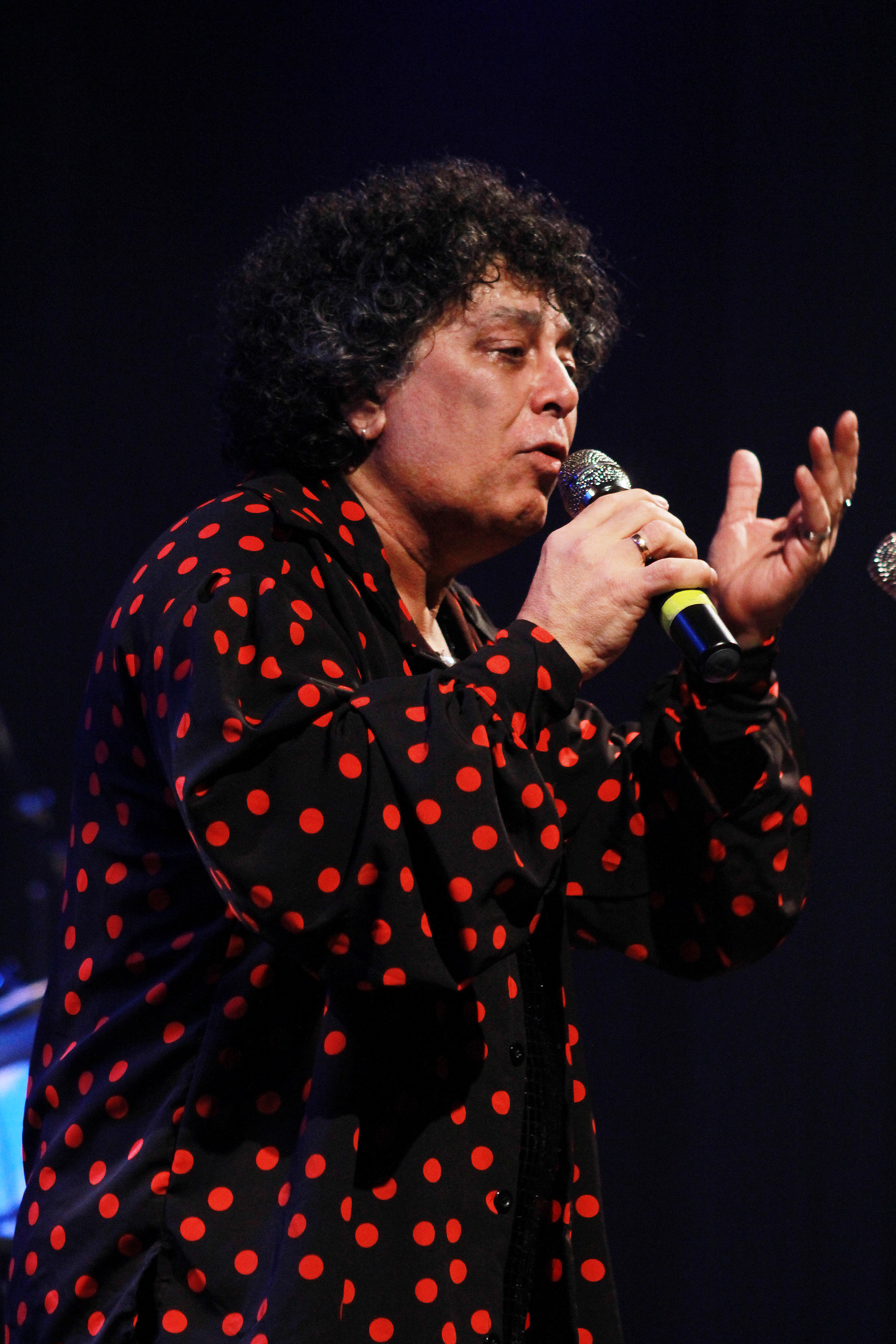
- Star in 2011
- Born: Edivaldo Souza; 10 January 1938; Juazeiro, Bahia, Brazil
- Died: 24 April 2025 (aged 87); São Paulo, Brazil
- Occupations: Singer, composer, actor, dancer, artist

Edivaldo Souza (10 January 1938 – 24 April 2025), better known by his artistic names Edy, Edy Souza (at the beginning of his career) and Edy Star, was a Brazilian singer, composer, actor, dancer, theatre producer, television presenter and artist. Having started working in entertainment as a child, he worked in various fields and in various genres, primarily with Brazilian burlesque (called chanchada), cabarets and revue theatre. Born and raised in the state of Bahia, in the Northeast of Brazil, he would move to Rio de Janeiro and São Paulo in the late 1960s, both of which by that point became the major entertainment centres of Brazil.

Star would go on, during the 70s, to become involved in avant-garde works, including the album Sociedade da Grã-Ordem Kavernista Apresenta Sessão das 10 with Raul Seixas, Sérgio Sampaio, and Miriam Batucada. He became known later on for his vulgar performances that challenged the limits of societal attitudes towards sexuality at the time. After having initially begun his performances in the then-rundown Praça Mauá in Rio de Janeiro, and, afterwards, continuing on to perform in locations often frequented by the upper class, such as the night clubs Number One and Up's. He later became known for his performances of The Rocky Horror Show, by Richard O'Brien. His success with his performances in Brazil led to the recording of his first album, Sweet Edy. He also worked in theatre and in television for the rest of that decade and into the 1980s. In the 1990s, Edy Star moved to Spain, where he continued to work at theatres and as a producer at night clubs. After living there for 20 years, he returned to Brazil and began singing again, relaunching his first album, as well as a new album, titled Cabaré Star, in 2017.

He was also known for his shows that mixed various styles of theatre and challenged the social conventions on sexuality at the time, being one of the first artists in Brazil to come out as gay.

== Biography ==
Star was born in Juazeiro on 10 January 1938, to a bookkeeper from an upper-middle class family from Salvador and a homemaker from a poor family in Juazeiro. His father had as a pastime amateur photography. He also worked as a football referee, and was refereeing a match in Juazeiro when he met Star's mother. His father's family did not approve of the relationship due to the socioeconomic status of his mother, but his father insisted on marrying her and moved to Juazeiro. Star, on turning a year old, moved with his family to Salvador.

With his siblings, he had a happy childhood in Salvador, living in a large house with a garden replete with banana, coconut, and mango trees. One of his childhood passions was reading. He read comics and magazines such as O Tico Tico, Captain Marvel, Classics Illustrated, Almanaque Vida Infantil, Revista da Semana, O Cruzeiro, and Revista do Globo. By 17, he also read many authors such as Alexandre Dumas, Érico Veríssimo, Monteiro Lobato, Charles Dickens, Edgar Allan Poe, and Jorge Amado.

Another passion of his in childhood was music. At home, he mainly listened to radio stations Nacional and Mayrink Veiga, along with local programs with Rádio Sociedade da Bahia — mainly A Hora da Criança. His father also used to take him to the studios which were led by teacher and journalist Adroaldo Ribeiro Costa. As he arrived home, he would improvise a microphone and stage in the garden and sing with his brothers. His first stage performance was when he was 13. His father observed the improvised sessions and signed him on to play at A Hora da Criança. During rehearsals done at Passeio Público de Salvador, he took theatre classes and participated in operetta montages based on works by Monteiro Lobato.

Along with his passions, Star always loved to design, which led him to become a plastic artist as well.

At 20 years old, he took courses at Petrobras and became a specialist in petroleum, working with the business as support and a production technician until 1961.

At the beginning of the 1960s, Star received the nickname Bofélia as a reference to the character Ofélia, played by actress Sônia Mamede on Balança Mas Não Cai, broadcast by Rádio Nacional at that time.

== Career ==
=== Early beginnings ===
Before working at Petrobras, Star had already participated in performances at a circus, against the wishes of his father who did not want his son to begin an artistic career. After being fired from Petrobras in 1961, he went on to start exhibitions of his paintings in Salvador, going by the name Edy Souza. He lived in the Boa Viagem neighborhood when he met Waldir Serrão and joined his rock and roll fan club, Elvis Club Rock, beginning to meet superficially a young Raul Seixas, at that point at just 15 years old. He began to rehearse rock with Serrão and keyboard player Thildo Gama, participating in various shows with the "turma do rock" in Salvador. At the same time, he met Caetano Veloso and Maria Bethânia, going and frequenting parties with the two siblings. In 1964, he came into contact with Gilberto Gil, already known as a singer for his performances on TV Itapoan. The two would come to compose a song together, "Procissão", which would be the first single released by Gil on his first album, Louvação, released in 1967. However, the co-authorship with Edy Star would only be recognized by Gil decades after. Not long after, Edy went on to perform with Caetano, Maria Bethânia, Gil and the youth that liked bossa nova in Bahia, which included Gal Costa and Tom Zé as well. Meanwhile, when they presented the special Nós, Por Exemplo..., which had its inaugural show at Teatro Vila Velha, which would reach a large audience for this group, Star did not take part, presenting a folklore show called Galeria Bazarte, mainly a handful of blocks while there. Though Augusto Boal had seen both shows, Star was not called when Boal took the rest of the group to São Paulo so that they could debut in the special Arena Canta Bahia, at Teatro de Arena. As a result, Star had maintained himself, since the beginning, as someone who would traverse the different cultural movements in Bahia, participating in both the "turma do rock" with Serrão and Seixas, as well as the "turma do Vila Velha", with Gil and Caetano.

Afterwards, he entered the Companhia Baiana de Comédias, presenting theatrical pieces in rural parts of various states in the northeast. This eventually took him to Pernambuco where, beginning in 1966, he established himself in the city of Olinda. Meanwhile, he also attempted a career as an artistic producer with TV Jornal do Commercio in Recife. His career took a turn when he starred in, together with Teca Calazans, the trendy musical Memórias de Dois Cantadores, which they performed in Recife in August 1967 and was accompanied by musicians Marcelo Melo and Geraldo Azevedo (guitars), Generino (flute), and Naná Vasconcelos (percussions). The play received numerous awards at the Festival de Teatro de Pernambuco in 1968, including for best musical, best figure, and best group. The musicals success opened the door for Edy Star to be invited, along with Naná Vasconcelos, to go to Rio de Janeiro to defend the song "Dia Cheio De Ogum", by composer Capiba, at the O Brasil Canta no Rio festival in December 1968. Though the song was not billed for the festival, it reached the final. There was later the release of an album with the 12 finalists through CID, a subsidiary of record label Itamaraty, Edy Stars record debut.

At the end of 1967, Edy Star returned to Bahia and became an artistic producer and presenter on TV Itapoan in Salvador. While there, producing and presenting the program Poder Jovem, he saw the arrival of new names such as Pepeu Gomes and Moraes Moreira, at a time before they formed the Novos Baianos, Rosa Passos, Maria Creuza, and Antônio Carlos e Jocáfi. Along with these, he appeared while singing on a program by Serrão on Rádio Cultura. It was on this program he met Seixas, who at that point lead the group Raulzito e os Panteras, a rock band that was widely known in Bahia for their performances while accompanying other artists, especially those connected to the Jovem Guarda en vogue in the state at that time. Star went on to have radio hits by singing from the repertoires of Jerry Adriani, Wanderley Cardoso, José Feliciano, and Trini Lopez, having as his most well known song a cover of the song La Bamba, where some sections of the audience did not like as much the more effeminate mannerisms that Star had. Meanwhile, after a difficult start, they soon became good friends. In 1968, Seixas went to Rio de Janeiro at the invite of Adriano to record an album for their group, but were not successful in creating any hits. However, after briefly to Bahia, he returned to Rio to become a producer at Discos CBS, again for works by Adriani. Star continued dividing his time between radio and TV and, during this time period, participating in various festivals with many different artists, including having personally met Ravi Shankar, Janis Joplin, Mick Jagger, and Marianne Faithfull.

=== With the Sociedade da Grã-Ordem Kavernista ===
In 1970, Star sought to pay late salaries while presenting a program live at TV Itapoan, summarily resulting in his dismissal. While going to a bar to take his mind off the situation, he found Seixas who invited him to go to Rio to work as an employee at Discos CBS, where Seixas had been a producer. This arrangement made it so that Star had enough to get by with periodic payments under the headings of "research rights" and "related rights". Seixas soon got his friend to record a compact CD produced by him, "Aqui É Quente, Bicho", by Seixas himself, and a cover of Harry Belafonte's "Matilda" sung by mutual friend Leno. Leno and Seixas were inseparable by 1970, as Seixas produced Vida e Obra de Johnny McCartney for him. The project ended up not being released, however, due to censorship issues. The project would be released in 1995 as a double compact disc that would have been released in 1971. Meanwhile, in January 1971, Seixas met Sérgio Sampaio when he was accompanying composer Odibar for an audition with the label. Despite Odibar having left, Seixas brought Sampaio on when he played a composition of his titled "Chorinho Inconsequente". As a result, they became inseparable friends beginning in 1971.

Seixas had decided to create a conceptual album, in the image of Sgt. Pepper's Lonely Hearts Club Band by The Beatles; Freak Out! by The Mothers of Invention; and Tropicalia ou Panis et Circencis by Caetano Veloso, Gal Costa, Gilberto Gil, Nara Leão, Os Mutantes, and Tom Zé. As such, he would see in Sampaio an ideal partner to go through with a Brazilian conceptual album, that would mix together influences from music both in Brazil and abroad. As they had decided to unite a diverse group to undertake the effort, they soon called on Star. Difficulties began to emerge when they wanted a female voice to add. They initially thought about Diana, the then girlfriend of Odair José, and Lílian, at that point in a duo with Leno, but they were both taken out of consideration due to their relationships. Another singer that was considered was Lena Rios, a singer from the state of Piauí who began her career by singing a song composed by Seixas at the 1972 International Festival of Song. After also being taken out of consideration, Star remembered a well-humored singer he had seen when he performed at a nightclub in Rio, Boate Drink, by Djalma Ferreira. When they called Miriam Batucada, she soon gained among them the nickname Dr. Silvana, due to the large pair of glasses she had used and reminded them of the DC Comics character.

The recordings of Sociedade da Grã-Ordem Kavernista Apresenta Sessão das 10 began in the last week of June 1971 and ended on the first week of the following month. The four produced a lot of material for the album, but various songs were cut due to censorship. In the end, they recorded 12 tracks where they divided the vocals, which were accompanied by members of the bands Renato e Seus Blue Caps and Lafayette e seu Conjunto, all interspersed by humorous vignettes. The production was done by Seixas and Mauro Motta, with arrangements by Ian Guest. The launch of the album occurred on 21 July and the album came to receive positive reviews from major figures of the Brazilian counterculture at the time: Torquato Neto, in his column at Última Hora; and philosopher Luiz Carlos Maciel, who wrote for the weekly newspaper O Pasquim. They also did interviews and were subject to a cartoon by Henfil. Nonetheless, Edy Star had his career interrupted by a unilateral decision from the label's president, Evandro Ribeiro, to take him out of stores, less than two months after the album's launch. The sales of the album at the time were hard to estimate due to his short career, but some of his songs began to be played on radio and had an impact on the counterculture scene in Rio de Janeiro.

There were many rumors around the album, spread mainly by Seixas and Sampaio: they said that the album had been the most expensive album produced in Brazil up to that point; or that an Egyptian harp had been sent to be brought to São Paulo to play only one chord; or even that the group had recorded the album while hidden, at night, so that nobody at CBS would know and that, for this reason, Seixas, who was a successful producer for the label, would have been fired for. All of these rumors were considered a marketing tactic by Seixas and Sampaio, and were summarily disproven by Edy Star in interviews after their deaths.

=== Edy becomes a Star ===
After the album with the Kavernistas, the group left Discos CBS in 1972, bothered by the lack of opportunities and the conservative nature of the label that had blocked them from pursuing new paths, instead preferring already used tropes. In this style, Edy Star went on to work at cabarets and nightclubs at Praça Mauá, with performances influenced by the theatre troupe Dzi Croquettes, led by Lennie Dale. In one of them, for example, they made a parody of the 1972 film Cabaret. Edy, performed in the parody, including a scene at the end of the show imitating Liza Minnelli receiving the Oscar for Best Actress. In other shows, he challenged the societal conventions at the time to parade completely nude women and dwarfs on stage, a number of lesbian cast members, and stripteases. It was at one of these shows, while at Boate Cowboy that Star was seen by Jaguar and Millôr Fernandes, who both wrote for O Pasquim, and invited him for an interview. The interview was a success (although headlines that used the term "androgynous" had been censored) and brought an influx of young intellectuals and artists to watch Edy at Praça Mauá, along with opening other opportunities in more famous places, including in São Paulo, such as Up's night club. During this time, he adopted the stage name of Edy Star.

That same year, he also took part in revues at Teatro Rival, considered a place of "resistance" against generic theatre that had changed its name to Café Concerto, at the time, due to the work of its new owner, Américo Leal. In one of its shows, they made a satirical piece that imitated Maria Alcina, which was seen by the singer and her business partner, Mauro Furtado. It gave such a good impression that the performance gave way for Edy Star to perform at the Number One nightclub, a gathering place for the elite in the Zona Sul. The reduto da alta sociedade na zona sul carioca. The businessman helped Edy to create an instrumental trio, and got two vocalists to accompany him: Áurea Martins and Djavan, whom had already worked as crooners at the nightclub. The high point of the show was the performance of a bolero called "Hipócrita" where he would sit on the laps of people in the audience and slap them in the face. One night, one of those whose faces was slapped was the son of the then chief minister of the Military Cabinet, João Figueiredo, who would become the last president of the military dictatorship. Even still, various people from the upper class would go to see his show, including, among others, Yolanda Costa e Silva, the widow of former president Costa e Silva.

While at Number One in 1973, the president of the label Som Livre, João Araújo, watched a performance of his and offered a contract to Edy to record an album. As such, Sweet Edy, his debut album, was released in 1974. The album, produced by Guto Graça Mello, contains songs by many of the great composers from the period, made specially for Star, including: Renato Piau, Sérgio Natureza, Roberto and Erasmo Carlos, Caetano Veloso, Gilberto Gil, Moraes Moreira and Luiz Galvão, Jorge Mautner, Getúlio Côrtes, Leno, and Raul Seixas. Unreleased songs included those by Luiz Melodia, Zé Rodrix and Gonzaguinha. The album had low sales, but it had been well received by critics, who focused on the artistic persona of Star and on the all-star cast of composers that wrote music for him. With the passage of time, he would gain a cult following that represented, along with the debut album of Secos & Molhados, the influence of glam rock musicians such as David Bowie, Alice Cooper, and Marc Bolan (of T. Rex) on Brazilian music.

=== Rocky Horror Show ===
At the end of 1974, producer Guilherme Araújo, who had been the group's businessman, called Star for a meeting at the house of fellow producer Kao Rossman. They informed Star that they had acquired the rights to create a Portuguese rendition of Richard O'Brien's Rocky Horror Show: the production would be done by Araújo and Rossman, with the translation done by Rossman and Jorge Mautner. It was to be directed by Rubens Corrêa. The intention was to call various artists connected to rock, including Wanderléa, Zé Rodrix, Raul Seixas, and Jorge Mautner, and, because of this, Star was to play the role of Frank-N-Furter. When he read the text of the play, he rejected the invitation, as he saw the play as a parody of B movies from decades past, and that the text was not translated to take into account the culturally specific context in Brazil. He also thought that the musical would be less serious and too lowbrow.

After Star rejected the offer, as did other musicians, they decided to go with professional actors. The piece made its debut on 14 February 1975 at Teatro da Praia, and the cast participated in the recording of an album by Som Livre. Released the same month, it was titled Rock Horror Show with composition by Eduardo Conde. The cast included Zé Rodrix, Kao Rossman, Diana Strella, Wolf Maya, Acácio Gonçalves, Vera Setta, Betina Viany, Lucélia Santos, and Nildo Parente. As predicted by Star, though the performances received good reviews by the public, the audiences would be silent, not showing much enthusiasm for what should have been a comedic piece. As such, when Conde found it would be impossible to continue due to suffering from hepatitis, Star was asked by Araújo to substitute him. Along with the main actor, the play also lost their director. As a result, Araújo and Rossman gave a blank slate to Star for him to make changes to the musical to make it more comedic. He added a comedic (or chanchada) character to the piece, based on his experiences with cabaret and revue theatre. From the beginning, the cast resisted his changes, asking that he be replaced. However, with the large public success that they would garner later own, they would later embrace the changes.

With the success of the musical, Star would go on to participate in musical programs at Rede Globo and Rede Tupi, along with his work in theatres and nightclubs. At the end of the 1970s, due to the rise of the disco era, he created a group called Zaza Big Circus which included Eduardo Rossler, Ernesto Grandelli, Gilberto Costa, Renato Castello, and Sydnei Beker. The idea was created as a mixture of Dzi Croquettes and As Frenéticas to produce something that resembled cabaret, chanchada, and revue theatre, but with the usage of disco rhythms. An album was to be released by CBS and produced by Rodrix and Gabriel O'Meara, but due to delays, the idea ultimately did not go forward.

=== Theatre and move to Spain ===
Starting in the 1980s, Star began to produce, write, and direct theatre play, including the comedy A Gargalhada do Peru, written in homage to Virgínia Lane and starred herself, Star, Leda Lúcia, and Jorge Lafond. In 1984, he was invited by Araújo to participate in a Carnaval dance party Gala Gay at Scala Rio nightclub. The play was a massive public and critical success, and was played in theatres for 10 years. Some time after, a remake of his of Le Bel Indifférent by Jean Cocteau, which took him to the Festival de Teatro en Primavera in Madrid, Spain in 1992. At one point while there, he was invited with his group to participate in the celebrations for the 1992 Summer Olympics in Barcelona. He decided afterwards to move to Spain, first to Barcelona, then to Madrid. There, he worked as a master of ceremonies at cabarets and nightclubs such as Chelsea II. Even still, he continued to work in theatre, including Un Payaso Perdido en Madrid, winning the awards for Best Actor of Alternative Theatre and Revelation Group at the V Muestra Alternativa Internacional de Teatro de Otoño in 1995.

=== Return to Brazil and rediscovery ===
After living for nearly 18 years in Spain, Star was invited by the Secretary of Culture of the city of São Paulo to present at the Virada Cultural Paulista in May 2009. For his performances remaking the entire album with the Kavernistas was considered by O Estado de S. Paulo as the best show of the 20 Anos sem Raul show. The success led him to be invited to remake the special the following year, and he decided to definitively return to Brazil. The success of his performances and his return to the country led to him being rediscovered to a wider audience, with new shows and even the rerelease of his debut album by the record label Joia Moderna in 2012. In 2017, he launched his second studio album, Cabaré Star, with production by Zeca Baleiro, leaving the label for Saravá Discos. Star repeated the formula of the first album, bringing on an all-star cast of composers (including songs by Gilberto Gil, Caetano Veloso, Herivelto Martins, Odair José, Zé Rodrix, Lula Côrtes, Sérgio Sampaio, and Miriam Batucada) and guest appearances by Caetano Veloso, Ney Matogrosso, Angela Maria, Zeca Baleiro, Catto, Emílio Santiago, and Seixas. The album received many positive reviews by the media and was followed by release tour by Star. In 2023, he released the album Meu Amigo Sérgio Sampaio, with rerecordings of songs by Sampaio, with participations by Maria Alcina, Renato Piau, and Zeca Baleiro.

=== Death ===
Edy Star died in São Paulo on 24 April 2025, at the age of 87. He had been hospitalized at Hospital Heliópolis due to complications of insufficient breathing, acute renal failure, and acute pancreatitis.

== Career as a plastic artist ==
As a plastic artist, he had more than 30 expositions in the United States and Europe, 16 of which were individual exhibits and four Biennales. Even then, he possessed a catalogue of works with a preface written by Jorge Amado. His works are in museums and collections by Brazilian artists. As a plastic artist, Star has an entry in the Dicionário de Artes Plásticas do Brasil, made by Roberto Pontual.

== Legacy ==
Edy Star was the first Brazilian artist to reveal that he was gay in an interview to the magazine Fatos & Fotos in 1973. Along with this, he is known for his style of mixing music and theatre, having been a pioneer towards the introduction of glam rock to Brazil, though this came with the challenge of the limits imposed on artists during the military dictatorship.

The life and career of Edy Star are depicted in the 2024 documentary film Antes que me esqueçam, meu nome é Edy Star, directed by Fernando Moraes.

== Discography ==
Discography listed on Discogs, along with the Dicionário Cravo Albin da Música Popular Brasileira, and by IMMUB.

=== CDs ===
- 1970 - Aqui É Quente, Bicho! / Matilda - Discos CBS
- 1974 - Baiock / Ai de Mim - Som Livre

=== Studio albums ===
- 1974 - Sweet Edy - Som Livre
- 2017 - Cabaré Star - Saravá Discos

=== With the Sociedade da Grã-Ordem Kavernista ===
- 1971 - Sociedade da Grã-Ordem Kavernista Apresenta Sessão das 10 - Discos CBS (with Raul Seixas, Sérgio Sampaio, and Miriam Batucada)

=== With Zaza Big Circus ===
- 1979 - Por uma Alegria Ampla, Geral e Irrestrita! - Discos CBS

=== Participations ===
- 1968 - O Brasil Canta no Rio - CID (Itamaraty) (track 5)
- 1974 - Corrida do Ouro - Trilha Sonora Original - Som Livre (track 9)
- 2006 - Erasmo 65 - Na Estrada - Universal Music Group (track 15 of disc 2)
- 2011 - Carrossel de Baco (with Carrossel de Baco. Track 2)
- 2012 - 100 anos de Gonzagão - Lua Music (Track 11 of disc 3)
- 2013 - Abaixo a Cueca - Paulo Azeviche (Track 1, "Abaixo a Cueca", authored by Zé Rodrix and Paulo Coelho)
- 2018 - Dalva de Oliveira - 100 Anos ao Vivo - Biscoito Fino (Track 13 of disc 1)

== Videography ==
Videography by IMMUB.

=== Participation ===
2011 - Sexo MPB - O Show - EMI (Track 9)

== Bibliography ==
- Moreira, Rodrigo. Eu quero é botar meu bloco na rua: a biografia de Sérgio Sampaio. 2 ed. rev. e ampl. Niterói: Muiraquitã, 2003.
