= Miriam Batucada =

Brazilian singer and TV presenter (1946–1994)

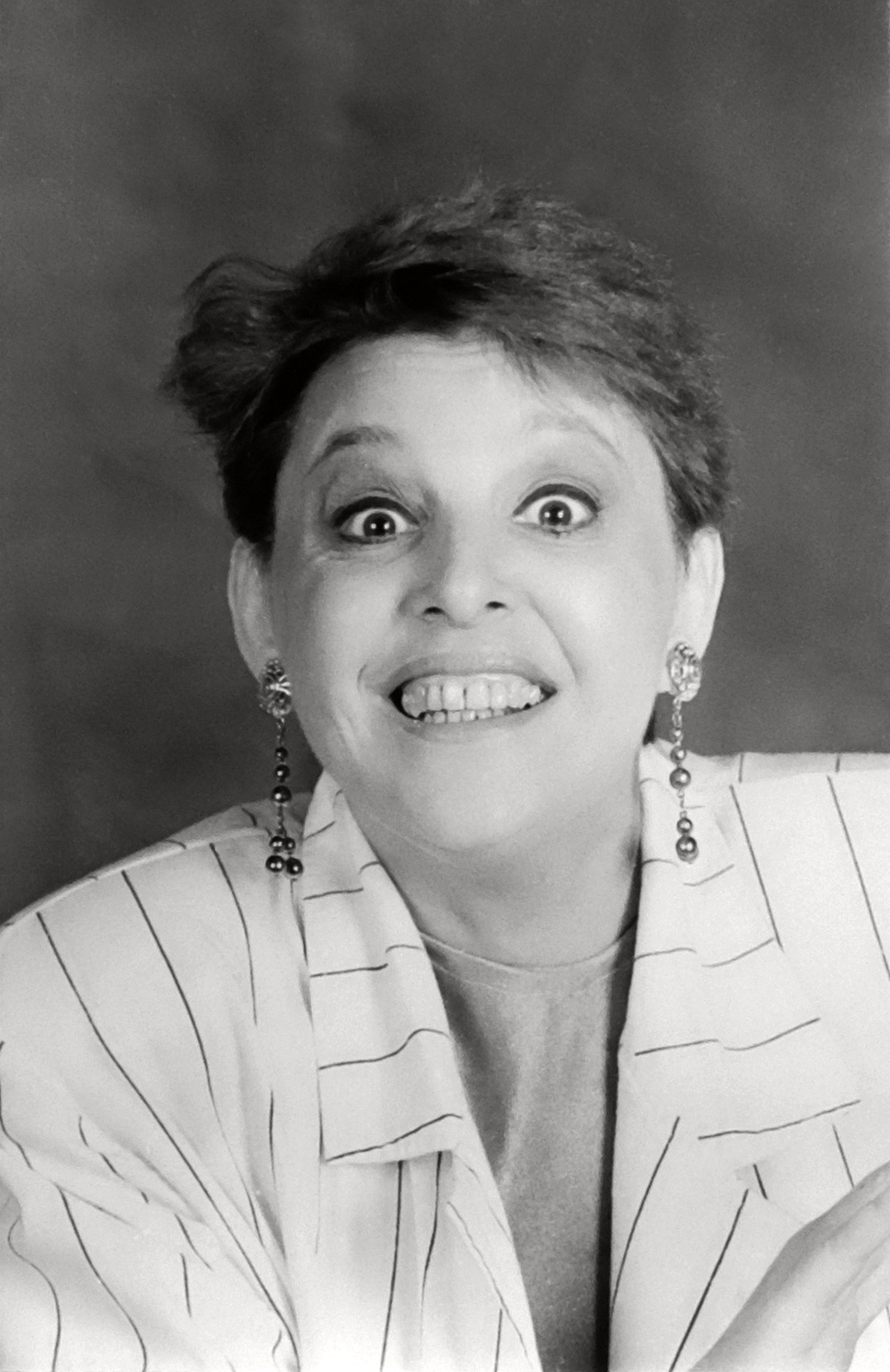

Background information
- Born: Miriam Ângela Lavecchia; 28 December 1946; São Paulo, Brazil
- Died: 2 July 1994 (aged 47) São Paulo, Brazil
- Genres: Samba; Soul; Rock and roll
- Occupations: Singer, composer, TV presenter
- Instruments: vocals, batucada
- Years active: 1966–1994

Miriam Ângela Lavecchia, better known as Miriam Batucada (28 December 1946 – 2 July 1994), was a Brazilian singer, composer, and TV presenter. Beginning her career as a performer on various TV shows, she was given her nickname from TV host Cidinha Campos for her batucada abilities. She transitioned into a musical career, going as Miriam Batucada, releasing several albums to modest sales.

She is best known for her participation for her participation on the album Sociedade da Grã-Ordem Kavernista Apresenta Sessão das 10, drawing from various influences, released on 21 July 1971 with the record label Discos CBS, together with Edy Star, Sérgio Sampaio, and Raul Seixas. Miriam Batucada would attempt to develop her career to little success in the years that followed. She released two more studio albums - Amanhã Ninguém Sabe, with label GEL; and Alma da Festa, independently released - without much public or commercial success. She died in 1994, but her works gained further notoriety due the rediscovery of the "kavernistas" beginning in the 2000s. With the relaunching of the original album, musicians began creating tributes and later released compilations with unreleased material from CDs.

== Biography ==
Miriam Batucada was born on 28 December 1946, in the neighborhood of Mooca in São Paulo, with which she would be identified with later on in her career, due to her form of speech being typical for people of Italian background in the region. However, her birth was registered on the first day of the following year so that she could "gain a year", as was common at the time, becoming her official birth date on public documents. Her grandparents, on both sides, were of Italian background.

When she was 17 years old, Batucada met a girl whose nickname was "Chacareira", in the salon of the hairstylist Dona Adelina, on Rua da Mooca; it was this childhood friend that taught her how to do percussion - for her to do batucada - with her hands. In the beginning, she would just do a slow rhythm, but after three months of practice, she was able to create very rapid rhythms, being able to reproduce the measures of any samba song. In the future, this would be her most recognizable feature during her musical career. Before attempting to begin her career, she took courses in typing at IBM and worked at the home appliance company Arno, not having been able to practice batucada as much due to her work.

Batucada was lesbian, though she did not reveal this during the course of her public life.

== Career ==
=== Television and music ===
Miriam began her career in 1966, with her participation on TV presenter Blota Júnior's show on RecordTV. On the show, she played various instruments, such as the piano, drums, harmonica, guitar, and the cuíca, along with showing her batucada skills. In the weeks that followed, she was hired by the channel, participating on the show of Blota Júnior's wife, Sônia Ribeiro, along with going on to perform regularly on the shows of Hebe Camargo and Ronnie Von on Saturday evenings. She came to present with acts including Os Mutantes, who were a long-running act on Ronnie Von's program at that time. She became famous for being what many considered to be a "show-woman" at the time: doing imitations, telling "stories" and jokes, and singing and playing musical instruments. It was in one of these programs that presenter Cidinha Campos called her Miriam da Batucada, leading to Miriam to adopt this as her stage name.

In 1967, she recorded her debut CD with the songs "Batucando nas Mãos" (by Renato Teixeira) and "Plác-Tic-Plác-Plác" (with Waldemar Camargo and Walter Peteléco), produced by Roberto Côrte Real for the small Pernambuco-based recording studio Rozenblit, with the record label Artistas Unidos. The recordings were used in a compilation by the same label, Seleção de Sucessos, released the same year.

The following year, she moved to Rio de Janeiro in an attempt to start her musical career, due to the city being seen as the center of the music industry in Brazil, with many record labels being based there. There, she released a duo CD with Odeon Records, including "Linguajar do Morro"; "Depois do Carnaval"; "Puro Amor"; and "Dois Meninos". However, these efforts proved unsuccessful. She went to live, during this period in time, on sporadic appearances, even going abroad to places like the United States and Portugal, and appearing in TV shows. A magazine at the time went so far as to publish that her and Ronnie Von did not have any talent, being just "inventions of RecordTV".

=== Kavernista ===
Despite Miriam's difficulties in Rio, in 1970, she was performing on Boate Drink with Djalma Ferreira, when she left a good impression on a young artist from the state of Bahia who arrived in Rio that year, Edy Star. He had entered into a contract with Discos CBS, negotiated by his longtime friend Raul Seixas. As such, when Seixas and his friend Sérgio Sampaio sought to bring people together for an innovative project in the Brazilian music industry, a concept album in the vein of Sgt. Pepper's Lonely Hearts Club Band from The Beatles; Freak Out! by The Mothers of Invention; and Tropicalia ou Panis et Circencis, by Caetano Veloso, Gal Costa, Gilberto Gil, Nara Leão, Os Mutantes and Tom Zé, Edy was the first to be called. As they wanted to include a female voice in the group, they considered the singer Diana, the then-girlfriend of Raul's friend Odair José, and Lílian, known for her musical duo with Leno, another friend of Raul at the time. They were both removed from consideration due to wanting to avoid conflicts with their romantic partners. They also considered Lena Rios, a singer from the state of Piauí for whom he had written songs for prior. After removing her from consideration as well, Edy proposed that Raul contact Miriam. Her humorous responses to their questions led her to become of the group.

As such, Miriam participated in the recordings of Sociedade da Grã-Ordem Kavernista Apresenta Sessão das 10, the only album launched by the "four kavernistas", through Discos CBS. She sang two songs on the group album: "Chorinho Inconsequente", with Edy Star and Sérgio Sampaio; and "Soul Tabarôa", a new song by the duo Antônio Carlos & Jocáfi she was able to get into the release of the album. The album was recorded between the end of June and the beginning of July 1971, and was released on 21 July. The album was well received by music critics associated with the Brazilian counterculture movement at the time, such as Torquato Neto, in his column in Última Hora, and philosopher Luiz Carlos Maciel, who wrote for O Pasquim. This garnered publicity and interviews for the group and cartoon caricatures by Henfil before Miriam's musical career was cut short by a unilateral decision made by the record label president, Evandro Ribeiro, to take the album off the shelves two months after its release. Record sales are difficult to estimate due to her short career, but some of her songs came to be played on radio and received attention among the people of Rio de Janeiro involved with the counterculture.

Despite the issues surrounding the album, Miriam would continue to be signed under Discos CBS and would launch another album in 1972, with production by Raul Seixas, containing songs such as "Diabo no Corpo", by Sérgio Sampaio, and "Gente", by Aluízio Machado.

=== Amanhã ninguém sabe ===
The following year, Miriam moved to the record label GEL, releasing the album Chantecler, with songs such as "Decisão", her own composition, and "Polichinelo", by Gadé and Almanir Grego. Due to being well-received publicly, she released Amanhã Ninguém Sabe in 1974. The album mixes rereadings of songs by classic samba composers, such as Wilson Batista, Geraldo Pereira, Alvaiade, Noel Rosa, and Lupicínio Rodrigues, with songs from more contemporary artists, such as her collaborator Sérgio Sampaio, as well as Roberto and Erasmo Carlos, and Chico Buarque, the writer of the titular song. She reached relative success with "Teco-Teco", written by Pereira da Costa and Milton Villela. The album also led to the single "Você É seu Melhor Amigo", another song she composed, along with "Você Vai se Quiser", by Noel Rosa and a duo CD, Acertei no Milhar, with songs like "O que Vier Eu Traço", by Alvaiade and Zé Maria; "Acertei no Milhar", by Wilson Batista and Geraldo Pereira; "Você Vai se Quiser"; and "Meu Romance" by J. Cascata. The same year, she participated on the show Samba, Coisa e Tal by Haroldo Costa, along with Grande Otelo, which became a critical and public success.

=== Decline ===
In the following years, Miriam would participate in the shows of Billy Blanco and Paulinho da Viola, along with releasing albums occasionally through RGE, Discos CBS, and Musidisc, being more known to the general public for her participation on Flávio Cavalcanti's show. From the 1980s onward, she had become increasingly isolated from the wider music industry, only appearing sporadically at bars throughout São Paulo. On 20 June 1991, she independently released her final studio album, Alma da Festa, through RIC. The album contained samba recordings from lesser known composers, with a special mention towards her musical partnership with Marcix, Roger Borin and Vivi Fagiolli in "Salve Rainha", a tribute to Chico Mendes who had been assassinated several years prior.

== Death ==
Miriam Batucada died on 2 July 1994, due to a heart attack in her apartment in the Pinheiros neighborhood, where she had been living alone. As she had not been in contact with her family in two weeks, her sister Mirna, who resided in Maringá, went to check on her and found her body nearly three weeks later, on 21 July.

== Legacy and rediscovery ==
The year she died, Miriam was memorialized by the Municipal Chamber of São Paulo by naming a street in Mooca after her. Since the beginning of the 2000s, her music has been rediscovered, along with the other kavernistas, through a new CD edition of the album, putting the catalogue together after nearly 30 years. As a result, many artists have given tribute to her in shows and in rerecordings and even a biography by journalist and historian Ricardo Santhiago being in production, though with no set date for release. New album releases also continue to occur. In 2018, a collection of songs from various discs were released by DGD Records.

In 2020, Santhiago discovered various unreleased songs by Miriam in a trunk that was given by a sister of the singer. Due to this, various invited artists came together to record an album of the songs with production by Sérgio Arara. The participants included Áurea Martins, Blubell, Ceumar, Cida Moreira, Edy Star, Juliana Amaral, Leila Maria, Márcia Castro, Marcos Sacramento, Maria Alcina, Silvia Machete, Vange Milliet, Vânia Bastos, Zé Luiz Mazziotti and Zeca Baleiro, along with rare recordings by Miriam herself. In 2023, a tribute of Miriam was made by the theatre group Os Geraldos in "Ubu Rei", directed by Gabriel Vilella.

== Discography ==
The discography comes from Discogs, Cravo Albin, IMMUB, and Tratore.

=== CDs ===
- 1967 – Batucando nas Mãos / Plác-tic-plác-plác - Rozenblit (Artistas Unidos)
- 1971 - Todo Mundo Está Feliz / Chorinho Inconsequente - Discos CBS (B-side only. A-side was sung by Sérgio Sampaio)
- 1972 – Diabo no Corpo / Gente - Discos CBS
- 1973 - Decisão / Polichinelo - GEL (Chantecler)
- 1975 - Você É seu Melhor Amigo / Você Vai se Quiser - GEL (Chantecler)
- 1975 - Sotaque Paulista - A Lua de Ontem / Abacaxi - RGE (Young)
- 1979 – Ajoelhou (A Mulher e o Cabrito) / Marcha do João - RGE (B-side only. A-side is sung by O lado A é cantado pelo Chacrinha)
- 1980 - Sinal De Vida / Batucada, Cachaça e Futebol - Discos CBS
- A Saia / Pantalona - Musidisc

=== Duo CDs ===
- 1968 - Linguajar do Morro / Depois do Carnaval / Puro Amor / Dois Meninos - Odeon
- 1974 – Acertei no Milhar - GEL (Chantecler)

=== Studio albums ===
- 1971 – Sociedade da Grã-Ordem Kavernista Apresenta Sessão das 10 (with Raul Seixas, Sérgio Sampaio and Edy Star) - Discos CBS
- 1974 – Amanhã Ninguém Sabe - GEL (Chantecler)
- 1991 – Alma da Festa - RIC

=== Compilations ===
- 1967 - Seleção de Sucessos - Rozenblit (Artistas Unidos) (strip 12)
- 2018 - A Batucada não Morreu - DGD Records

== Bibliography ==
- MOREIRA, Rodrigo. Eu quero é botar meu bloco na rua: a biografia de Sérgio Sampaio. 2 ed. rev. e ampl. Niterói: Muiraquitã, 2003.
- PETILLO, Alexandre. Curtindo Samba. Caxias do Sul: Belas-letras, 2012.
