= O Futuro Pertence à... Jovem Guarda =

Studio album by Erasmo Carlos
- Released: February 4, 2022
- Recorded: 2021
- Genre: Rock, Jovem Guarda, iê-iê-iê
- Length: 28:14
- Label: Som Livre
- Producer: Pupillo

Erasmo Carlos chronology
Quem Foi Que Disse Que Eu Não Faço Samba... (2019)	O Futuro Pertence à... Jovem Guarda (2022)	Erasmo Esteves (2024)

O Futuro Pertence à... Jovem Guarda is an album by Brazilian singer and songwriter Erasmo Carlos, released on February 4, 2022, by Som Livre record label. The album won the Latin Grammy Award for Best Portuguese Language Rock or Alternative Album in 2022.

== Background ==
The thirty-third album by Erasmo Carlos, O Futuro Pertence à... Jovem Guarda, was artistically directed by Marcus Preto and musically produced by Pupillo, released on February 4, 2022, by the record label Som Livre. The cover illustration was by Marcelo Mente and refers to other works by Erasmo, Projeto Salva Terra and Gigante Gentil.

The album was initially released on music streaming platforms and later gained a vinyl record version produced by Bilesky Discos. The cover of the physical vinyl record was designed by Erasmo and released in 2023, one year after the singer's death.

The album is a revisitation of Jovem Guarda, a Brazilian cultural movement of the 1960s that revealed names such as Erasmo Carlos, Roberto Carlos, Wanderléa, among others.

== Tracks ==
No.	Title	Writer(s)	Length
1.	"Nasci pra Chorar"	Erasmo Carlos, Dion DiMucci	3:00
2.	"O Ritmo da Chuva"	John Gummoe	4:13
3.	"Alguém na Multidão"	Rossini Pinto	3:13
4.	"Tijolinho"	Wagner Benatti	3:17
5.	"Esqueça"	Mark Anthony, Roberta Corte Real	3:11
6.	"A Volta"	Roberto Carlos, Erasmo Carlos	4:55
7.	"Devolva-me"	Renato Barros, Lílian	3:57
8.	"O Bom"	Carlos Imperial	2:25
Total length:			28:14

== Tour ==
Carlos performed concerts in support of the album in Porto Alegre, São Paulo, Rio de Janeiro, Curitiba, Caeté, and Vila Velha.

== Critical reception ==
Music journalist Mauro Ferreira, in his blog on G1, gave the album a positive review, rating it four stars out of five, and noted that "this repertoire, as simple as it is captivating, reappears wrapped in a contemporary sound that deviates from the modern indie track." In an open letter from producer Marcelo Fróes published in the Rio de Janeiro newspaper O Globo, Froés highlighted: "I thought the concept of your new album and your statements about Jovem Guarda were sensational. I never thought that you and/or Roberto Carlos had any responsibility to defend Jovem Guarda as a ‘movement’, as a musical style or as a generic term for artists of so-called youth music."

Germana Macambira, writing for the newspaper Folha de Pernambuco, gave a favorable review of Erasmo's work, adding: "Just the right amount of warmth and with the necessary appeal for a good old-time rocker, the album reflects how much Erasmo Carlos is still carried by music, although it is unnecessary to prove his timeless effervescence, ingrained in his more than five decades as an artist and composer of hundreds of songs that accompany and span generations."

== Accolades ==
The album was nominated for a Latin Grammy Award in 2022. At a ceremony held at the Michelob Ultra Arena in Las Vegas, United States, the album won in the category of Best Portuguese Language Rock or Alternative Music Album, just five days before the singer's death.

The following year, the work was nominated for the Brazilian Music Award. At a ceremony held at the Theatro Municipal do Rio de Janeiro, in the city of Rio de Janeiro, he won the category of Best Pop/rock release.

Awards and nominations for O Futuro Pertence à... Jovem Guarda
Year	Awards	Local	Category	Result	Ref.
2022	Latin Grammy Awards	Michelob Ultra Arena, Paradise, Nevada, United States	Best Portuguese Language Rock or Alternative Album	Won	
2023	Brazilian Music Awards	Theatro Municipal, Rio de Janeiro, Rio de Janeiro, Brazil	Best Pop/rock release	Won	

== Personnel ==
The following musicians worked on this album:

- Erasmo Carlos (vocals)
- André Lima (synthesizers)
- Carlos Trilha (synthesizers)
- Luiz Lopez (guitar)
- Pedro Baby (guitar)
- Pedro Dias (bass)
- Rike Frainer (drums)
- Zé Lourenço (keyboards)
