= 28th Brazilian Music Awards =

2017 edition of award ceremony

- Date: 19 July 2017
- Location: Theatro Municipal; Rio de Janeiro
- Hosted by: Maitê Proença; Zélia Duncan
- Website: premiodamusica.com.br

Television/radio coverage
- Network: Canal Brasil

The 28th Brazilian Music Awards (Portuguese: 28.° Prêmio da Música Brasileira) were held on 19 July 2017, at the Theatro Municipal in Rio de Janeiro, to recognize the Brazilian music of 2016. The ceremony was hosted by actress Maitê Proença and singer Zélia Duncan, and was broadcast by Canal Brasil. Ney Matogrosso was honored at the ceremony.

== Winners and nominees ==
The nominees were announced on 20 June 2017. Winners are listed first and highlighted in boldface.

=== MPB ===
Best Male Singer	Best Female Singer
**Lenine**; João Fenix; Vidal Assis	**Maria Bethânia**; Patrícia Bastos; Zizi Possi
Best Group	Best Album
**MPB4**; Quarteto em Cy; Tão do Trio	**The Bridge – Lenine and Martin Fondse Orchestra**; Abraçar e Agradecer – Maria Bethânia; Batom Bacaba – Patrícia Bastos

=== Special awards ===
Classical Album	Electronic Album
**Ernesto Nazareth Integral – Maria Teresa Madeira**; Latinidade: Música para as Américas – Orquestra Ouro Preto; Radamés Toca Radamés – Quarteto Radamés Gnattali	**Craca, Dani Nega e o Dispositivo Tralha – Craca e Dani Nega**; Incerteza – Retalho; Subtropical Temperado – Projeto CCOMA
Children's Album	Album in Foreign Language
**Os Saltimbancos Sinfônico – Orquestra Petrobras Sinfônica**; Farra dos Brinquedos – Farra dos Brinquedos; Vem Dançar – Pequeno Cidadão	**Yentl em Concerto – Alessandra Maestrini**; Old Friends (The Songs of Paul Simon) – Ritchie and Black Tie; Perpetual Gateways – Ed Motta
Special Project Album	Best DVD
**Delírio de um Romance a Céu Aberto – Zé Manoel**; A Luneta do Tempo – Alceu Valença; Irineu de Almeida e o Oficleide 100 Anos Depois – Various artists	**Rainha dos Raios Ao Vivo – Alice Caymmi**; A Democracia das Madeiras – Various artists; Dobrando a Carioca – Zé Renato, Moacyr Luz, Jards Macalé and Guinga

=== Regional ===
Best Male Singer	Best Female Singer
**Alceu Valença**; Alberto Salgado; Raymundo Sodré	**Ana Paula da Silva**; Dona Onete; Socorro Lira
Best Group	Best Duo
**Grupo Rodeio**; Grupo Serelepe; Viola Quebrada	**Zé Mulato & Cassiano**; Caju & Castanha; Craveiro & Cravinho
Best Album
**Cabaça D'água – Alberto Salgado**; Celebração – Valdir Santos; Vivo! Revivo! – Alceu Valença

=== Pop/Rock/Reggae/Hip Hop/Funk ===
Best Male Singer	Best Female Singer
**Rael**; Silva; Zeca Baleiro	**Maria Gadú**; Céu; Larissa Luz
Best Group	Best Album
**BaianaSystem**; Metá Metá; O Terno	**Canções Eróticas de Ninar – Tom Zé**; Palavras e Sonhos – Luiz Tatit; Tropix – Céu

=== Popular music ===
Best Male Singer	Best Female Singer
**Odair José**; Luiz Caldas; Romero Ferro	**Ivete Sangalo**; Ellen Oléria; Elza Soares
Best Group	Best Duo
**Saulo Duarte e a Unidade**; Roupa Nova; Samuca e a Selva	**Zezé Di Camargo & Luciano**; Leonardo & Eduardo Costa; Milionário & Marciano
Best Album
**Elza Canta e Chora Lupi – Elza Soares**; Cine Ruptura – Saulo Duarte e a Unidade; Gatos e Ratos – Odair José

=== Instrumental ===
Best Group	Soloist
**Letieres Leite and Orkestra Rumpilezz**; Banda Mantiqueira; Trio Madeira Brasil	**Toninho Ferragutti**; Hamilton de Holanda; Mestrinho
Best Album
**A Saga da Travessia – Letieres Leite and Orkestra Rumpilezz**; Alegria – Hamilton de Holanda and Orquestra de Mato Grosso; Outra Coisa – Anat Cohen and Marcello Gonçalves

=== Samba ===
Best Male Singer	Best Female Singer
**Zeca Pagodinho**; Martinho da Vila; Pedro Miranda	**Roberta Sá**; Mart'nália; Teresa Cristina
Best Group	Best Album
**Casuarina**; Galocantô; Grupo Bongar	**Samba Original – Pedro Miranda**; De Bem Com a Vida – Martinho da Vila; Quintal do Pagodinho 3 (Ao Vivo) – Zeca Pagodinho

=== Other awards ===
Best Song	New Artist
**"Descaração Familiar" – Tom Zé**; "Dizputa" – Carol Naine; "Nunca Mais Vou Jurar" – Zeca Pagodinho, Arlindo Cruz and Marcelinho Moreira	**BaianaSystem**; Liniker e os Caramelows; Vidal Assis
Visual Project	Arranger
**Amor Geral – Fernanda Abreu (Giovanni Bianco)**; Duas Cidades – BaianaSystem (Filipe Cartaxo); Jardim Pomar – Nando Reis (Mário Niveo)	**Letieres Leite**; Luis Filipe de Lima; Zé Manoel
