= Sodré =

Sodré (Portuguese pronunciation: [so'dɾɛ]) or Sodre may refer to:

== People ==
- Constante Gomes Sodré, the third president (governor) of the Brazilian state of Espírito Santo
- Jéssica Sodré (born 1985), Brazilian television actress
- Joanídia Sodré (1903–1975), Brazilian music educator, pianist, conductor and composer
- Mimi Sodré, (1892–1982), Brazilian scout and football striker
- Pierre Veiga Sodre (born 1987), Brazilian Midfielder
- Raimundo Sodré (born 1948), Brazilian musician
- Vasco Gil Sodré (c.1450–c.1500), Portuguese navigator
- Vicente Sodré (1465–1503), Portuguese knight of Order of Christ and naval captain

== Other ==
- SODRE, Servicio Oficial de Difusión, Radiotelevisión y Espectáculos, Uruguay's national broadcaster
- Sodre National Auditorium, a building in Montevideo, Uruguay

== See also ==
- Cais do Sodré, railway and metro stations in Lisbon, Portugal
- Cais-do-Sodré té Salamansa, the first short story book published by Orlanda Amarílis
- Estádio Leônidas Sodré de Castro or Estádio da Curuzú, football stadium in São Braz neighborhood, Belém, Pará, Brazil
- Sodere
- Soderi
- Szczodre
- Sedreh
- Seudre
- Szedres
