= Ed Lincoln =

Brazilian musician, composer and arranger

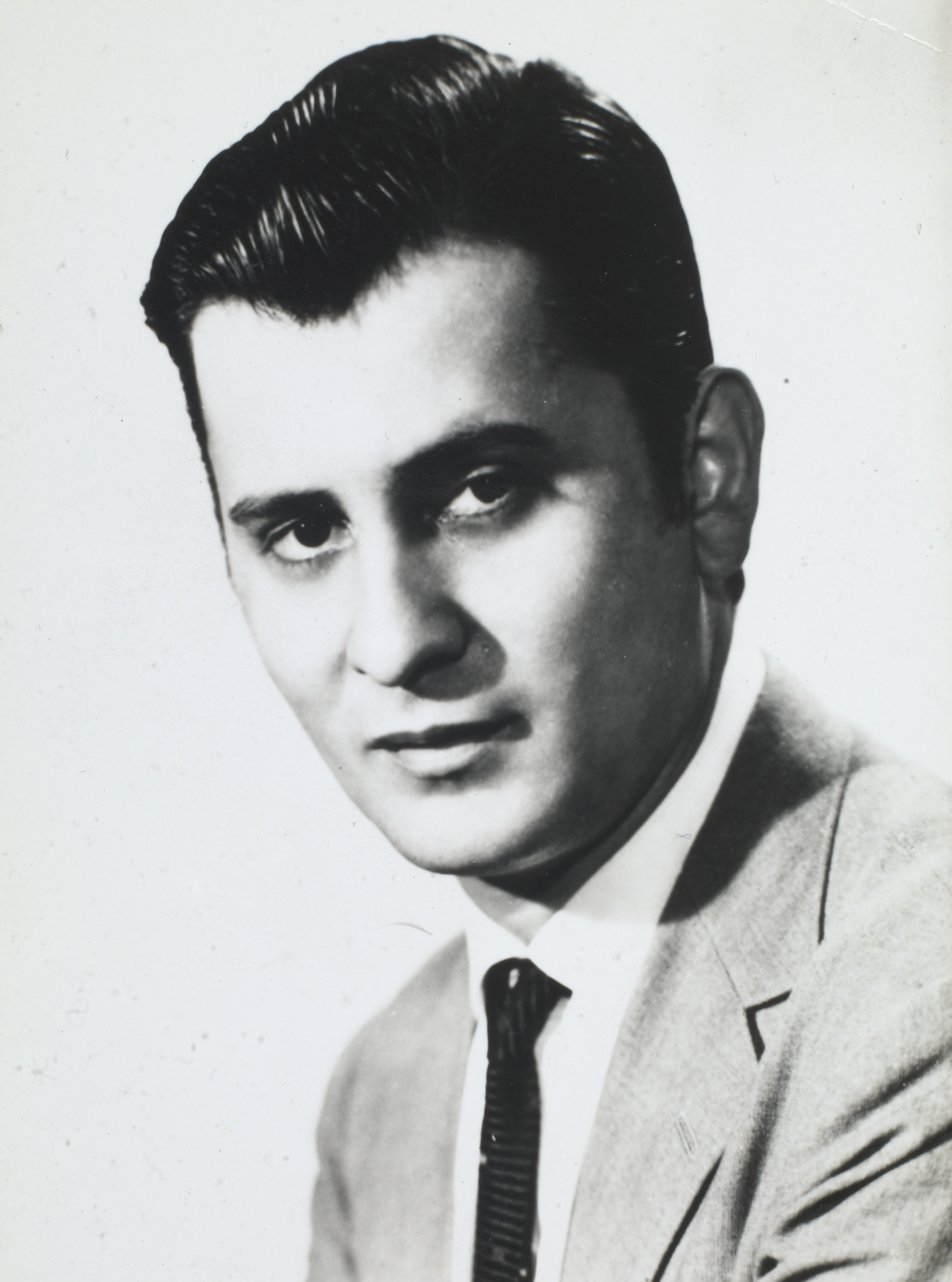

Background information
- Born: Eduardo Lincoln Barbosa de Sabóia; May 31, 1932; Fortaleza, Ceará, Brazil
- Died: July 16, 2012 (aged 80) Rio de Janeiro, Brazil
- Genres: Jazz, Brazilian jazz, bossa nova, samba, space age pop, easy listening
- Occupations: Musician, composer, arranger
- Instruments: piano, double bass, Hammond organ
- Years active: 1951–2012
- Labels: Helium; Musidisc; De Savoya

Ed Lincoln (Eduardo Lincoln Barbosa de Sabóia; May 31, 1932 – July 16, 2012) was a Brazilian musician, composer and arranger known for a wide variety of styles. As a bassist, he was present at the earliest moments of bossa nova and as a Hammond organ player, he was foundational in establishing the sound of Brazilian jazz and space age pop.

His most widely heard compositions include O Ganso (Ed Lincoln and D'Orlann), É o Cid (Ed Lincoln and Sílvio César), Palladium (Ed Lincoln and Orlandivo) and Ai que Saudade Dessa Nega. His most successful arrangements include O Bêbado (Durval Ferreira and Orlandivo), Na Onda do Berimbau (Oswaldo Nunes), Romantic Partners (Nilo Sérgio) and The Blues Walk, the latter in collaboration with American trumpeter Clifford Brown.

== Early years ==
Lincoln was born on May 31, 1932, in Fortaleza, capital of Ceará, Brazil. His mother played organ in the local Presbyterian Church and his older sister learned classical piano at home, but Lincoln himself did not play until he saw the film Rhapsody in Blue as a young teenager, and rushed home to scribble notes on musical staff paper. He began learning popular songs such as Ary Barroso's Aquarela do Brasil. Playing piano at age 16, Lincoln formed a trio with a cousin and a friend, and performed on a weekly program on Radio Iracema. Lincoln was at the same time the sports editor for the newspaper Diário do Povo.

Lincoln's early influences included jazz performances by Shorty Rogers, Gerry Mulligan, J. J. Johnson & Kai Winding, and Chet Baker; artists whose recordings he heard played on the hi-fi systems belonging to the parents of his rich friends.

At 18, Lincoln left Ceará for Rio de Janeiro to study architecture. There, Lincoln began performing on piano each midday for Radio Roquette Pinto, where he met and formed friendships with a variety of musicians including Luizinho Eça, Johnny Alf, Geraldo Vandré, Sergio Ricardo, Juquinha (bossa nova drummer), Dick Farney and Tom Jobim. Lincoln pestered the radio station engineers to play him all the newest North American jazz discs, and formed an early appreciation for the work of Oscar Peterson.

=== Double bass ===
Lincoln agreed to form a combo with Luiz Eça and Johnny Alf, even though they asked him to play double bass, an instrument he had never touched. After the new trio signed a contract with the Plaza Bar at the Plaza Hotel in Rio, Lincoln used his share of the advance money to buy a bass, learning it in one week. The trio was a success. After some time, Lincoln began to gain notability as a talented young bassist at jam sessions, and recorded with Trio Plaza, Maestro Radamés Gnattali Quintet and took part in the first bossa nova recording produced by Aloisio de Oliveira. Eça left to study music in Vienna, and Lincoln reformed the trio with himself on piano, Baden Powell on guitar and Luiz Marinho on bass: the Hotel Plaza Trio. The trio included a fourth musician, singer Claudette Soares, billed as the "Princess of the Baiao". Lincoln saw further success with this group, and continued to participate in after-hours jam sessions around town, making friends with Sylvia Telles, Carlos Lyra, Miele & Bôscoli, Garoto, João Donato, João Gilberto, Tom Jobim, Milton Banana and even Ary Barroso.

=== Hammond organ ===
In 1958, Lincoln was playing bass regularly for Hammond organist and club owner Djalma Ferreira at the popular Drink Club in Rio de Janeiro. After Ferreira was wounded by a gunshot to the belly (he was arriving at his own property, with his oldest son, when the security guard mistook him for a thief), Lincoln was taken to the club at 5 o'clock in the evening on Friday and directed to learn to play the organ by 9 o'clock when the club opened. Previously, Lincoln had not been allowed to touch the instrument, but he proceeded to teach himself enough of its idiosyncrasies that he was able to successfully lead Conjunto Drink through a busy evening. Lincoln soon discovered that the Hammond organ allowed him to use his skill at the piano keyboard while bringing the supporting knowledge of his bass line experience to the organ's foot pedals. The electronic organ also provided a new array of synthetic tonalities he could experiment with.

== Solo career ==
Lincoln's first solo album. The cover art was commissioned from the editor of a woman's magazine who asked to be listed as composer alongside Lincoln in lieu of payment

On November 2, 1958, Lincoln recorded an album for Helium, a small record label. The owner of Helium decided that 'Eduardo Lincoln' was not commercial enough as a name, and released the album as Ao Teu Ouvido (In Your Ear) by Ed Lincoln. The album was re-released at various times under other titles including Boite, Impacto and Ontem Hoje e Sempre.

Lincoln signed with Musidisc in 1960 and released another solo album, This is Ed Lincoln, or Órgão Espetacular (Organ Spectacular), in 1961. Lincoln combined piano and Hammond organ lines by using recording studio technology to double and triple himself in the same song. The first cut on the album was his childhood favorite, Aquarela do Brasil.

20-year-old Eumir Deodato filled in for Lincoln in 1963 when a car accident put Lincoln in recovery for seven months.

== Later years ==
In 1968, Lincoln formed his own record label: De Savoya Discos, releasing a self-titled album with liner notes on the back explaining that the 12 songs were in 12 styles that were very different from each other to show the artist's facility as a performer and composer. He formed the "DeSavoya Combo" and began producing albums and arranging songs for other artists, including Elza Soares in the 1970s.

In 1989, Polygram released what would be Ed Lincoln's last solo album, Ed Lincoln: Novo Toque (New Touch). Lincoln began to use computers as a composition tool on this album, beginning with a Commodore 64. After that, Lincoln concentrated on producing and arranging.

In the 1990s, some of Ed Lincoln's releases were pirated and played widely by disc jockeys in England to become successful as source material for dance tracks. Two such songs were Cochise and Se Você Quiser.

Several albums have been recorded in Rio at Lincoln's "Studio Ed Lincoln", including one by Marvio Ciribelle called Era só o que Faltava in 1993. Lincoln occasionally accepts recording dates, and appeared playing organ on one track, Conversa Mole, on an Ed Motta album released in 2000.

== Death ==
Ed Lincoln died on July 16, 2012, in Rio de Janeiro. Lincoln was 80 years old and he died of respiratory failure.

== Pseudonyms ==
Ed Lincoln recorded under many different names during his career; at times he used a new name for each musical style or for each new record. He was originally listed as Eduardo Lincoln when taking part in larger ensembles, then became Ed Lincoln in 1958. He recorded a single album as "Don Pablo de Havana" in 1962, five albums as "Les 4 Cadillacs" or "Os 4 Cadillacs" from 1961 to 1964 and he arranged, produced and performed with the "De Savoya Combo" in 1969 for his own label "Savoya Discos". In the 1970s and 1980s, he recorded under a large number of American-sounding names. Other aliases include Berry Benton, Cláudio Marcello and "Muchacho nas Bocas". More recently, Lincoln created recordings alone at his computer under the names "Orquestra Romance Tropical", Gloria Benson and "Orquestra Los Angeles".

== Personal life ==
Lincoln had two sons, Marcos and Marcelo Sabóia, who have carried their father's legacy by involving themselves in his recording studio business.

== Filmography ==
Lincoln appeared in four films: Colégio de Brotos (1955), Vamos com Calma (1956), Na Onda do Iê-Iê-Iê (1966) and Estranho triângulo (1970). He composed the music for two films, the musical comedy Adorável Trapalhão in 1967 (in which he also appeared as himself) and the musical Juventude e Ternura in 1968, working with Érlon Chaves on the latter film.
