= 30th Brazilian Music Awards =

2023 edition of award ceremony

- Date: 31 May 2023
- Location: Theatro Municipal; Rio de Janeiro
- Hosted by: Lázaro Ramos; Lilian Valeska; Felipe Neto
- Website: premiodamusica.com.br

Television/radio coverage
- Network: YouTube

The 30th Brazilian Music Awards (Portuguese: 30.° Prêmio da Música Brasileira) were held on 31 May 2023, at the Theatro Municipal in Rio de Janeiro, to recognize the best in Brazilian music. The ceremony was hosted by Lázaro Ramos, Lilian Valeska and Felipe Neto, and was broadcast live on YouTube. Alcione was honored at the ceremony. It was the first ceremony since 2018.

The Brazilian Music Awards announced in October 2022 that it had decided to eliminate gender-specific award categories. The Male Singer and Female Singer awards were replaced with one category, Performer. The Pop/Rock/Reggae/Hip Hop/Funk category has been divided into two, Pop/Rock and Urban Music. The Best DVD award was renamed to Best Audiovisual Product.

== Winners and nominees ==
The nominees were announced on 25 April 2023. Winners are listed first and highlighted in boldface.

=== Popular music ===
Duo	Group
**Maiara & Maraisa**; Nage; Os Barões da Pisadinha	**Psirico**; Orquestra Greiosa; Zimbra
Performer	Release
**Marília Mendonça**; Duda Beat; Lucy Alves; Roberta Miranda; Roberto Carlos	**"De Amor, Amor" – Felipe Cordeiro and Chico César**; "Dar uma Deitchada" – Duda Beat; Decretos Reais – Marília Mendonça

=== Special awards ===
Electronic Release	Release in Foreign Language
**Entre Cidades – Batata Boy e Garbela**; Todos os Lados – Gerra G; Baile & Bass – VHOOR	**Cássia Eller & Victor Biglione in Blues – Cássia Eller and Victor Biglione**; Versions of Me – Anitta; "If You Only Knew (Acoustic)" – Blubell and Luca Raele
Classical Release	Children's Release
**"Bachiana Nº 4 - 1º Movimento" – Brazilian Symphony Orchestra**; "Abertura da Ópera o Guarani (Ao Vivo)" – Brazilian Symphony Orchestra; Divertimento para Cordas (Ao Vivo) – Brazilian Symphony Orchestra	**"É Alegria" – Mundo Bita**; Bloco Fera Neném – Dudu Nicácio; "Lá na Fazenda do Meu Pai" – Planeta DóRéMi and Léo Pinheiro
Special Project
**Desengaiola – Alfredo Del-Penho, João Cavalcanti, Moyseis Marques and Pedro Miranda**; Baby e Pepeu (Ao Vivo no Noites Cariocas) – Baby do Brasil and Pepeu Gomes; Malhada Vermelha (Trilha Sonora Original do Filme) – Gabriel Aragão

=== Instrumental ===
Group	Soloist
**Letieres Leite and Orkestra Rumpilezz**; Gian Correa e os Chorões Alterados; PianOrquestra	**Yamandu Costa**; Bebê Kramer; Dom Salvador; Jaques Morelenbaum; Jorge Helder
Release
**Simpatia – Yamandu Costa and Bebê Kramer**; Dom Salvador Trio (Samborium) – Dom Salvador; Moacir de Todos os Santos – Letieres Leite and Orkestra Rumpilezz

=== MPB ===
Group	Performer
**Bala Desejo**; Banda de Boca; MPB4	**Djavan**; Alaíde Costa; Dori Caymmi; Gilberto Gil; Mônica Salmaso
Release
**O Que Meus Calos Dizem Sobre Mim – Alaíde Costa**; Valencianas II: Ao Vivo Em Portugal – Alceu Valença and Orquestra de Ouro Preto; "Que Tal um Samba?" – Chico Buarque and Hamilton de Holanda

=== Urban music ===
Group	Performer
**Planet Hemp**; Afrocidade; Pavilhão 9	**Criolo**; Baco Exu do Blues; Gloria Groove; Iza; Xênia França
Release
**QVVJFA – Baco Exu do Blues**; Sobre Viver – Criolo; Jardineiros – Planet Hemp

=== Pop/Rock ===
Group	Performer
**Gilsons**; Jovem Dionisio; Ratos de Porão	**Elza Soares**; Chico César; Erasmo Carlos; Tom Zé; Tulipa Ruiz
Release
**O Futuro Pertence à... Jovem Guarda** **– Erasmo Carlos**; Elza ao Vivo no Municipal – Elza Soares; Vestido de Amor – Chico César

=== Regional ===
Duo	Group
**Mayck & Lyan**; Duo Aduar; Sample Hate	**Boi Bumbá Garantido**; Olodum; Quinteto Violado
Performer	Release
**Alceu Valença**; Almir Sater; Elba Ramalho; Isadora Melo; Zeca Veloso	**Elba Ramalho No Maior São João do Mundo (Ao Vivo) – Elba Ramalho**; Do Amanhã Nada Sei – Almir Sater; "O Sopro do Fole" – Zeca Veloso

=== Samba ===
Group	Performer
**Fundo de Quintal**; Grupo Revelação; Raça Negra	**Diogo Nogueira**; Ferrugem; Maria Rita; Martinho da Vila; Péricles
Release
**Mistura Homogênea – Martinho da Vila**; "Fim do Horizonte" – Diogo Nogueira and Hamilton de Holanda; Fundo de Quintal - 45 Anos Vol.1 (Ao Vivo) – Fundo de Quintal

=== Other awards ===
Best Song	New Artist
**"Que Tal um Samba?" – Chico Buarque and Hamilton de Holanda**; "Pessoa-Ilha" – Alaíde Costa; "Chorou e Riu" – Zé Miguel Wisnik	**Plínio Fernandes**; Fernando Dias Gomes; Maurício Guil
Audiovisual Project
**Pra Gente Acordar (O Filme) – Gilsons**; "Tropa" – Anitta and Luck Muzik; "Fé" – Iza; "Ameianoite" – Pabllo Vittar and Gloria Groove; "Mistificar" – Tim Bernardes
