= Sérgio Sampaio =

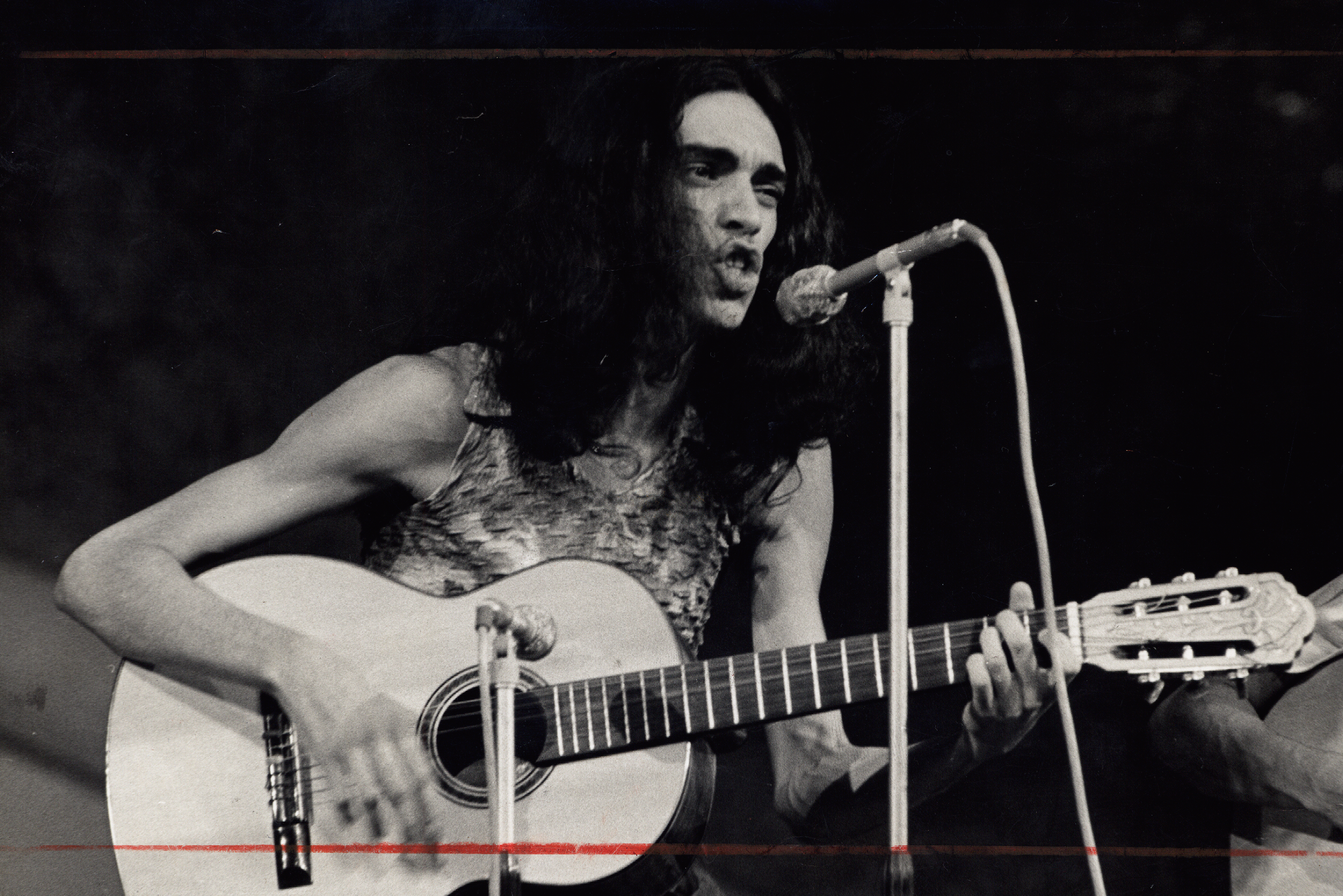
- Sérgio Sampaio in 1973

Background information
- Born: April 13, 1947; Cachoeiro de Itapemirim, Espírito Santo, Brazil
- Died: May 15, 1994 (aged 47); Rio de Janeiro, RJ, Brazil
- Genres: MPB, blues, rock, samba, bolero
- Years active: 1970–1994
- Labels: Discos CBS, Philips, Continental

Sérgio Moraes Sampaio (April 13, 1947 — May 15, 1994) was a Brazilian singer and songwriter. His compositions span several musical genres from samba and choro to rock and roll, blues and ballads.

Sampaio was considered an outsider name ("maldito") in Brazilian music.

== Life and career ==
Sampaio was born in Cachoeiro de Itapemirim, to Raul Gonçalves Sampaio, owner of a shoestore and bandleader, and Maria de Lourdes Moraes, schoolteacher

A fan of radio programs, where he followed the singers of the time such as Orlando Silva, Sílvio Caldas, and Nelson Gonçalves, who inspired him, he made impressions of radio broadcasters such as Luiz Jatobá and Saint-Clair Lopes, getting a job at a radio station in his hometown, XYL-9. In 1964, he tried to work in Rio de Janeiro at Rádio Relógio, returning after four months.

In late 1967, he moved permanently to Rio, initially to try his hand at a career as a radio broadcaster, and to attend the city's nightlife. Sampaio could not keep a job; he lived in cheap boarding houses and even on the street, even begging for food.

Sergio had started singing at night in bars, until February 1970, when he resigned from Rádio Continental to dedicate himself entirely to music. He applied to the Festival Fluminense da Canção, a stage of the Festival Internacional da Canção (III FIC) of that year, and was among the twenty finalists with the song "Hei, você"..

In Rio de Janeiro he met Raul Seixas, then a record producer at CBS (currently Sony Music) company, and a long friendship and partnership began. After a test with Paulo Diniz's partner Odibar, he was hired in his place the following year, participating in several recordings, as part of the chorus of Renato e seus Blue Caps.

He signed, under the pseudonym Sérgio Augusto, the lyrics to the song "Sol 40 graus", recorded by Trio Ternura and which was a hit in 1971. The Trio recorded other of his compositions, such as "Vê se dá um jeito nisso" - a partnership with Raul Seixas, with whom he also shared "Amei você um pouco demais", recorded by José Roberto. Raul produces his first compact in which Sergio experienced some success with "Coco Verde", soon re-recorded by Dóris Monteiro.

He returned to his hometown in July, where he participated in the "II Festival de MPB", winning first place and also taking fourth place. Together with Raul Seixas he started the production of an opera-rock project, whose lyrics were censored by representatives of the Brazilian military dictatorship. In spite of this, the songs became part of Raul Seixas' first record: "Sociedade da Grã-Ordem Kavernista Apresenta Sessão das 10", featuring Miriam Batucada and Edy Star.

In 1973, he released his first LP by Philips, produced by Raul and named "Eu Quero Botar Meu Bloco na Rua", with several renowned musicians; the record failed in sales, despite his appearance in television programs and the good airplay of songs like "Cala a boca, Zebedeu", by his father, in the radios.

== Discography ==
=== Albums ===
- 1973 - Eu Quero É Botar meu Bloco na Rua
- 1976 - Tem que Acontecer
- 1982 - Sinceramente
- 2006 - Cruel

=== Anthologies and participations ===
- 1971 -Sociedade da Grã-Ordem Kavernista Apresenta Sessão das 10
- 1972 - Carnaval Chegou (LP, 1972)
- 1973- Phono 73
- 1975- Convocação geral nº 2
- 1998- Balaio do Sampaio (CD, 1998)
- 2002- Sergio Sampaio
