= Jerry Adriani =

Brazilian singer, musician and actor

- Born: Jair Alves de Sousa; 29 January 1947; São Paulo, Brazil
- Died: 23 April 2017 (aged 70) Rio de Janeiro, Brazil
- Genre: Pop rock
- Occupations: singer, actor, musician
- Instruments: Guitar, vocal
- Years active: 1964–2017

Jerry Adriani (Jair Alves de Sousa; 29 January 1947 – 23 April 2017) was a Brazilian singer, musician and actor. He began his career in television while working with Rede Tupi in São Paulo. His early work included his time as vocalist with the ensemble Os Rebeldes.

== Life and career ==
Born Jair Alves de Souza on January 29, 1947 in Brás, São Paulo, he began his professional career in 1964.

In 1965, he recorded A Great Love, which was the first of his LPs to be recorded in the Portuguese language only. He became presenter of the TV music programme Excelsior to Go Go, on the São Paulo station 'TV Excelsior', alongside Luís Aguiar. The show featured songs by Vips, The Incredibles, Trini Lopez and Cidinha Campos, among others. He presented the live musical show The Great Parade between 1967 and 1968, while at the other big São Paulo TV station Rede Tupi. It featured such artists as Neyde Aparecida, Zélia Hoffmann, Betty Faria and Marília Pêra.

From 1969 to 1971, Raul Seixas was Adriani's producer, until the start of his solo career.

In the 1970s, he performed in Venezuela, Peru, the United States, Mexico, Canada and other countries.

In the early 1990s, he recorded the 24th disc of his career, "Elvis Vive", which focussed on the origins of Rock 'n Roll and also served as a tribute to Elvis Presley.

To celebrate his 70th birthday, Adriani appeared in three episodes of the Italian television programme "MilleVoci", produced by Gianni Turco, which aired in January 2017.

== Death ==
Adriani died at a hospital in Rio de Janeiro from cancer on 23 April 2017, aged 70.

== Filmography ==
- 1994 - 74.5 Uma Onda no Ar - Roberto
- 1998 - Programa Mil Faces
- 2001 - Malhação - Bruno
- 2010 - A Grande Família - Celso Tadeu
- 2011 - Macho Man - Oliver
- 2013 - A Grande Família - Ele mesmo
