= Maria Alcina =

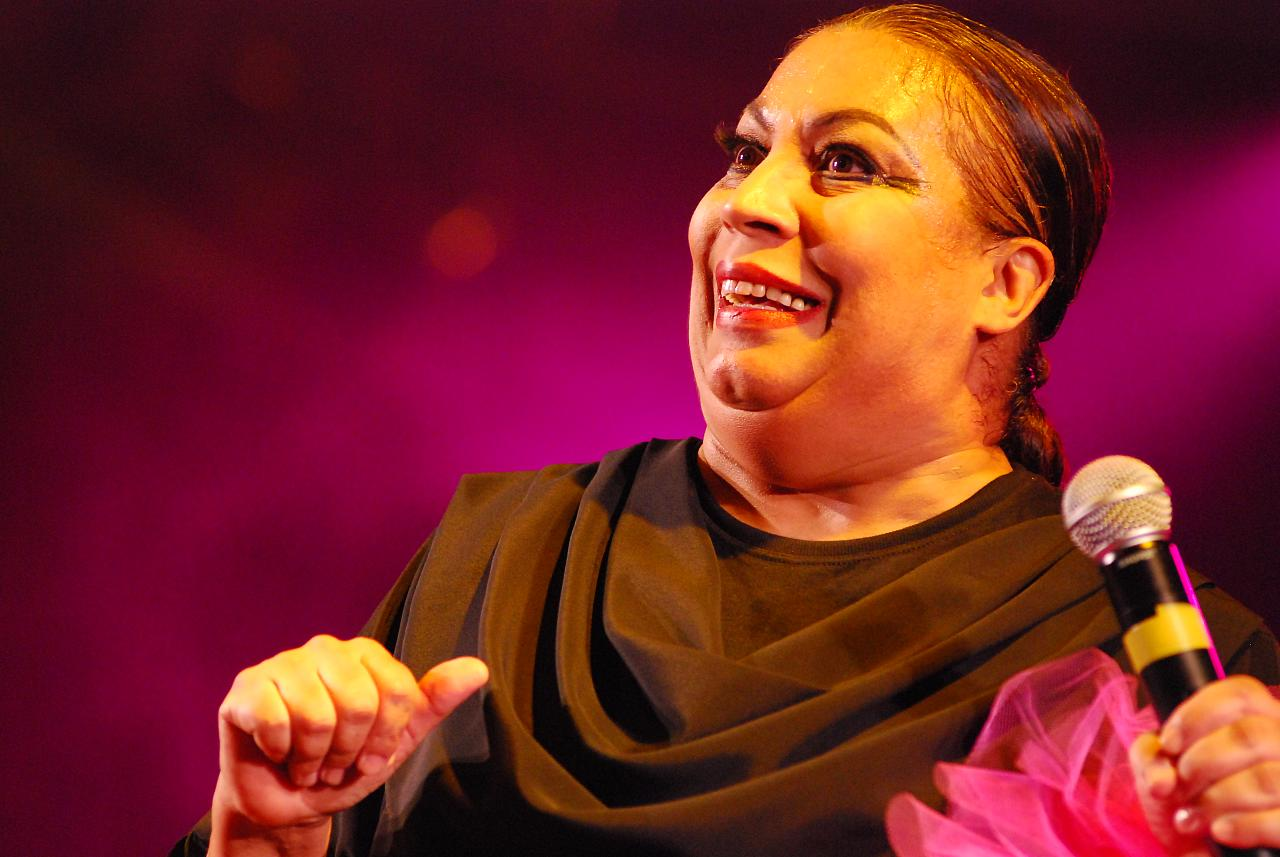

Background information
- Born: Maria Alcina Leite; 22 April 1949 (age 77); Cataguases, Minas Gerais, Brazil
- Genres: MPB; Samba
- Occupation: Singer
- Years active: 1966–present

Maria Alcina Leite (born 22 April 1949) is a Brazilian singer.

Among her biggest successes were "Fio Maravilha" (Jorge Ben), the winner of the national phase of the Festival Internacional da Canção in 1972, and "Kid Cavaquinho" (João Bosco and Aldir Blanc).

Known for her deep voice and stage presence, she won the Troféu Imprensa and has participated in television shows such as Discoteca do Chacrinha, Qual é a Música?, and many others in that time period. She has performed in Brazil and abroad.

Her manner of dress has drawn comparisons to Carmen Miranda.

== Career ==
Maria Alcina was born on 22 April 1949 in Cataguases, Minas Gerais, where she was also raised. At the beginning of her career, she worked for 7 years at a circus. She moved to Rio de Janeiro at 17. At the beginning of the 1970s, she performed at clubs and music shows in Ipanema and Copacabana, such as Number One nightclub Number One. In 1971, at Teatro Copacabana, she became a highlighted star of the show alongside Tony Tornado and MPB4.

She gained national prominence in 1972, at the 7th and last edition of the Festival Internacional da Canção (FIC), where she sung Jorge Ben's samba "Fio Maravilha" on 16 September 1972. The success was such that she won an honorable mention by the festival that year. She performed the song at Maracanãzinho.

Soon after the Festival, Maria Alcina released her debut album, Maria Alcina, in 1973. This would be followed by her second album in 1974. The same year she was banned from performing in public and the circulation of her music on radio and television were vetoed by the military dictatorship.

In 1976, she was the main highlight during the parade of Samba schools during the Rio Carnaval for the school Beija-Flor, participating in a allegory where she represented a deer in the samba-enredo "Sonhar com rei dá leão" by Carnaval organizer Joãosinho Trinta. Her performance was so notable that a photo of her performing was chosen to be the album cover for the LP for the Samba Schools in 1977.

In 1978, she recorded a version of the anthem of SC Corinthians Paulista and the song “Transplante de Corintiano”.

During the 1980s, Alcina had an off-season period from music and instead went on TV, where she was a freshman juror.

In 1989, she played the main role in the children's musical Luluxa, written and directed by Nuno Leal Maia, at the Teatro Bandeirantes in São Paulo.

In 2004, she recorded a CD with an electronic beat, titled Agora, with Bojo, a band made up of Maurício Bussab, Du Moreira, and Kuki Stolarski. In the CD, some classics from her career were remade as electronic covers, such as Eu dei, Alô, alô and Fio Maravilha; along with these songs, it included previously unreleased songs.

In 2010, she recorded Maria Alcina Confete e Serpentina, produced by de Mauricio Bussab. It won the Brazilian Music Awards for "Best Singer" and "Best CD".

In 2014, she recorded a CD titled De Normal Bastam Os Outros, with production by Thiago Maques Luis, celebrating 40 years of her career. The work also has compositions by Zeca Baleiro, Arnaldo Antunes, Péricles Cavalcanti, Felipe Cordeiro, Anastacia, Karina Bahur, Osvaldo Nunes, Adoniran Barbosa, João Bosco and Aldir Blanc, Totonho e os Cabras, Jorge Ben Jor, Chico Anysio, and wit the participation of Ney Matogrosso, singing the song "Bigorrilho". The album was received enthusiastically by critics and the launch show was considered one of the best shows of 2014 by journalist Alexandre Eça.

In 2016, Maria Alcina released the DVD De Normal Bastam Os Outros at Sesc Belenzinho. The DVD was recorded at Auditório Ibirapuera in São Paulo, directed by Thiago Brito and Rafael Saar, and again produced by Thiago Marques Luiz.

On 15 June 2017, she released Espírito de tudo, where she approaches with personality the repertoire of Caetano Veloso.

On 29 January 2019, Maria Alcina performed with the orchestra SP Pops Symphonic Band at Teatro da UMC in São Paulo, a show that would be released on CD and DVD as Maria Alcina in Concert.

In February 2022, she released the singles "Extravagantes celestes" and “Rei mandou".

The film "Sem vergonha" portrays her biography as an artist, approaching her work as an operator of music and her obstacles working during the Military Dictatorship. Directed by Rafael Saar, the film was shown at the Mostra Internacional de Cinema de São Paulo 2024 and at the 28th Mostra de Cinema de Tiradentes. The cast included Maria Alcina herself, além de Ewä, Ayo Faria, Bayard Tonelli, João Vitor Linhares, Leticia Guimarães, Marcelle Morgan, Marco Chavarri, Renata Bronze, and Sidnei Oliveira, with guest appearances by Antonio Adolfo, Ciro Barcelos, Edy Star, Ney Matogrosso, and Rovilson Pascoal.
