= Leno (singer) =

- Born: Gileno Osório Wanderley de Azevedo; 25 April 1949; Natal, Rio Grande do Norte, Brazil
- Died: 8 December 2022 (aged 73) Natal, Rio Grande do Norte, Brazil
- Genres: Rock; Jovem Guarda
- Occupations: Singer, composer, and guitarist
- Years active: 1965—2022

Gileno Osório Wanderley de Azevedo (25 April 1949 – 8 December 2022), better known as Leno, was a Brazilian singer, composer, and guitarist.

== Career ==
Leno was born in Natal on 25 April 1949. He began his musical career in 1965 during the Jovem Guarda era. After becoming part of some bands, he was discovered by producers from the record label CBS, when he met Renato Barros of Renato e Seus Blue Caps. He went on to form a duo with Lílian Knapp, Barros' girlfriend and a friend of Leno since childhood. Their duo, Leno & Lílian, released its first single in 1966, a disc with the songs "Pobre Menina" and "Devolva-me" that, beginning with their participation on the Jovem Guarda program on Emissoras Unidas, brought them great success and leading them to be recognized nationally. That same year, they would released their first self-titled album, which included the single "Eu Não Sabia que Você Existia", which was also a radio success. Afterwards, Leno began to compose songs for other artists on the label, especially for Renato e seus Blue Caps, building up a reputation as well for being a composer.

After the release of his second studio album, Não Acredito, which put "Não Acredito" and "Coisinha Estúpida" on radio, misunderstandings between the two singers led to the end of the duo in 1968. That same year, he released his first solo album, Leno, and had a success with the song "A Pobreza". He participated as a composer for some Renato e seus Blue Caps albums at the end of the 60s. After another album that attempted to repeat the Jovem Guarda formula, titled A Festa dos seus 15 Anos, he was not able to land a success on the radio at all. He decided to reformulate his solo career when he met Raul Seixas, who was a producer at CBS, and the two went on to be close friends. It was Seixas who led him to a new direction in his career, helping him to produce the album Vida e Obra de Johnny McCartney between November 1970 and January 1971. Meanwhile, with various songs of his censored, the album was shelved by CBS, being only launched as a Maxi single. Even still, Leno was informed that the master tracks of the album were destroyed. That album, with production and lyrics by Seixas and participation by the bands A Bolha, Renato e seus Blue Caps, and the Uruguayan band Los Shakers, was meant to be a turning point in his career and that would lead to the release of his album on 8 channels in Brazil, but this did not materialize.

As a result, he returned to be a duo with Lílian in 1972, releasing two albums, but without the success of those albums. In 1976, he released Meu Nome É Gileno, with his own music, including a rerecording of the 1971 single "Grilo City" and rerecordings of songs such as "Luar do Sertão" (by poet Catulo da Paixão Cearense) and "Me Deixe Mudo", by composer Walter Franco. In the 1980s, he released a unique album, having difficulties in keeping forth in his musical career. In the decade that followed, he participated in various homages to the Jovem Guarda that led to him being able to record again. In 1995, researcher Marcelo Fróes discovered the master discs of Vida e Obra de Johnny McCartney at the archives of Sony Music Brasil, the successor to CBS, and Leno was finally able to release the album. In the following years, he did performances and releases inspired by nostalgia for the Jovem Guarda and for its connection to Seixas.

== Death ==
Leno died on 8 December 2022 in Natal after suffering from cancer.

== Discography ==
Discography based on pages and referenced works.

=== Leno e Lilian ===
==== Studio albums ====
- 1966 – Leno e Lilian
- 1967 – Não Acredito
- 1972 – Leno e Lilian
- 1973 – Leno e Lilian

==== CDS ====
- 1966 – Devolva-me / Pobre Menina
- 1967 – Está Pra Nascer / Não Vai Passar
- 1967 – Coisinha Estúpida / Um Novo Amor Surgirá

==== EPs ====
- 1966 – Leno e Lilian
- 1967 – Leno e Lilian - Vol. II
- 1967 – Não Acredito
- 1968 – Não Acredito - Vol. II

==== Collections ====
- 1966 – As 14 Mais - Vol. XVIII (06 "Devolva-me e 13 "Pobre Menina")
- 1967 – As 14 Mais - Vol. XIX (03 "Está pra Nascer" e 12 "Não Vai Passar")
- 1967 – As 14 Mais - Vol. XX (03 "Não Acredito" e 12 "Parem Tudo")

=== Solo career ===
==== Studio albums ====
- 1968 – Leno
- 1970 – A Festa dos seus 15 Anos
- 1976 – Meu Nome É Gileno
- 1981 – Encontros no Tempo
- 1990 – Coração Adolescente
- 1995 – Vida e Obra de Johnny McCartney
- 2006 – Idade Mídia
- 2010 – Canções com Raulzito

==== Live ====
- 2000 – Coisas que a Gente Viveu

==== CDs ====
- 1968 – A Pobreza / Me Deixe em Paz
- 1970 – A Última Vez que Eu Vi Rozane / É Bom Estar em Natal mais uma Vez
- 1970 – Sha-la-la / Corina, Corina
- 1974 – Flores Mortas / Rock Baby Rock
- 1983 – Quero Amanhecer com Você / Com Muito Prazer
- 1984 – Rosa de Maio / Sonho Tropical

==== EPs ====
- 1971 – Lady Babel / Convite para Ângela / Johnny McCartney / Peguei Uma Apollo

==== Collections ====
- 1988 – O Melhor de Leno 1974-1988
- 1995 – Aquelas Canções - Antologia 1968-1970

==== Tributes ====
- 1991 – Brasil - Jovem Guarda
- 1995 – 30 Anos de Jovem Guarda - Vol 2 ("Ritmo de Chuva")
- 1995 – 30 Anos de Jovem Guarda - Vol 4 ("A Pobreza")
- 2002 – O Pulo do Negro Gato (01 "Negro Gato" e 11 "Esqueça e Perdoe")
- 2005 – Jovem Guarda para Sempre (01 "Momentos Inesquecíveis", 05 "Pobre Menina", 06 "Devolva-me", 07 "Veja se me Esquece" and 14 "Era Um Garoto Que Como Eu Amava os Beatles e os Rolling Stones")

=== Grupo Matéria Prima ===
- 1973 – Sessão de Rock

== Videography ==
- 2005 – Jovem Guarda para Sempre com "Pobre Menina", "Veja Se Me Esquece", "Jovem Guarda" e "Era Um Garoto Que Como Eu Amava os Beatles e os Rolling Stones"

== See also ==
- Rock Concert – Television program narrated by Leno during the 1970s.
