= Pierre Sodre =

Brazilian footballer

Personal information
- Full name: Pierre Veiga Sodre
- Date of birth: May 31, 1987 (age 39)
- Place of birth: Encruzilhada do Sul, Brazil
- Height: 1.89 m (6 ft 2 in)
- Position: Midfielder

Team information
- Current team: Moto Club de São Luís

Youth career
- 2003–2008: Internacional

Senior career*
Years	Team	Apps	(Gls)
2009	Sapucaiense		
2010	Esporte Clube Avenida		
2011	Riopardense		
2011–2012	Brasil de Pelotas		
2012	Atlético de Tubarão		
2013	Esporte Clube Avenida		
2013	Atlético de Tubarão		
2014	Moto Club de São Luís		
- * Club domestic league appearances and goals

Pierre Veiga Sodre (born May 31, 1987) is a Brazilian football midfielder, currently playing for Moto Club de São Luís.
