= Vila Velha Theater =

Performing arts theater in Salvador, Brazil

- Teatro Vila Velha
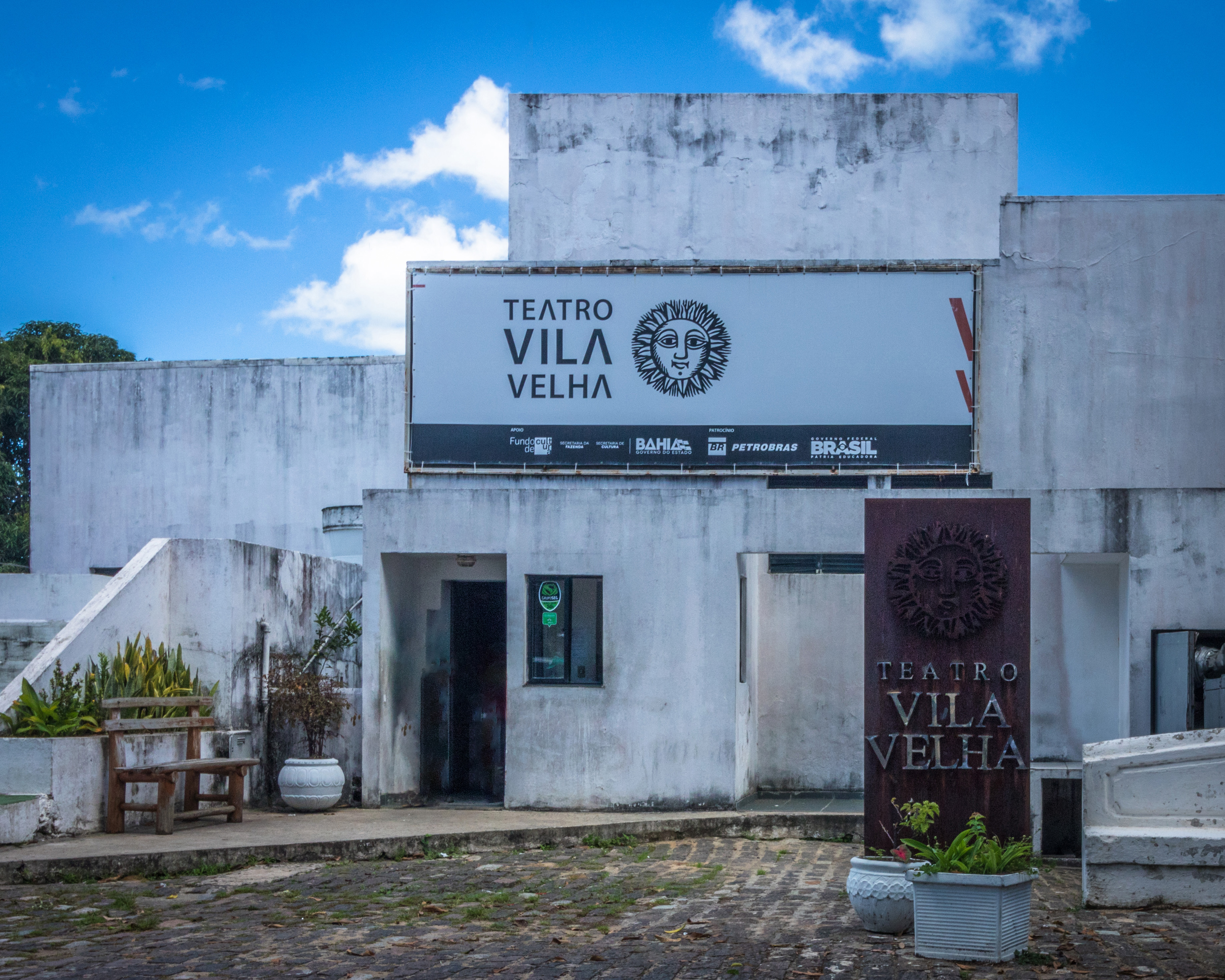
- Facade of Teatro Vila Velha, 2017

- Location within Brazil

General information
- Architectural style: Modern architecture
- Location: Salvador, Brazil
- Coordinates: 12.98556°S 38.52176°W
- Inaugurated: 1964

Design and construction
- Architect: Silvio Robatto

Other information
- Number of rooms: 5

Website
- www.teatrovilavelha.com.br

The Vila Velha Theater (Portuguese: Teatro Vila Velha), also known simply as "Vila", is a performing arts center in Salvador, Bahia, Brazil. The theater was constructed in 1964 and is located on Avenida Sete, at the west of the 19th-century Neoclassical public area, the Passeio Público.

The Vila Velha Theater is based in the Teatro dos Novos Society (Portuguese: Sociedade Teatro dos Novos, STN), the first professional theater group dating to the 1950s. The group was led by João Augusto de Azevedo (1928-1979), a professor at the Federal University of Bahia. A group of dissident students, which consisted of Echio Reis, Sônia Robatto, Carlos Petrovich, Othon Bastos, Thereza Sá, and Carmem Bittencourt, led the creation of a permanent theater. The state government of Bahia granted a space in the Public Promenade in 1961 for the construction of the new theater. The premiere show of the theater was title Nós, Por Exemplo ("We, For Example") included Caetano Veloso, Gilberto Gil, Tom Ze, Gal Costa, and Maria Bethânia.

The theater was a center of the 1960s counterculture movement, Tropicália, and cultural opposition to the Military dictatorship in Brazil (1964-1985). Vila hosted social protest events in the 1970s. The theater entered into a period of decline with the death of João Augusto in 1979. A revitalization of the theater began in 1994 under the Sol Movimento da Cena, a non-profit organization. A large-scale renovation of the theater building followed in 1998.

== Structure ==
The theater was designed by the architect Silvio Robatto (1935-2008) and built in the Modern style. The style is in stark contrast to the numerous 19th century Neoclassical structures of the Passeio Publico, and of the Palácio da Aclamação.

- The Sala Principal (Main Room) is the main stage of the theater. Its configuration can be changed according to the genre of presentation, but holds up to 350 people.
- Cabaré dos Novos is a café-theater that houses a concert hall. The space accommodates 90 people.
- Sala João Augusto (João Augusto Room) is the primary rehearsal room of the theater. It additionally hosts smaller performance and dramatic readings.
- Sala 2 (Room 2) is the smaller rehearsal room. Like Sala João Augusto, it additionally hosts workshops and workshops.
- The foyer of Vila Velha occasionally hosts exhibitions and small public events.

== Groups in residence ==
The Vila Velha Theater has held numerous performance groups in permanent residence. They include, at different time periods, the Companhia Teatro dos Novos, an experimental theater company; the Bando de Teatro Olodum, an Afro-Brazilian theater group; Viladança, contemporary dance group; Vilavox, Vila choir; Novos Novos, a children's theater group; the COATO Coletivo; and the Revista Barril.
