= Lílian (singer) =

- Born: Sílvia Lílian Barrie Knapp; 30 March 1948; Rio de Janeiro, Brazil
- Died: 22 February 2025 (aged 76) São Paulo, Brazil
- Genres: Rock; Jovem Guarda
- Occupations: Singer, composer
- Years active: 1965—2025

Sílvia Lílian Barrie Knapp, better known as Lílian Knapp or simply Lílian (30 March 1948 – 22 February 2025), was a Brazilian singer and composer.

She was part of the duo Leno & Lílian which had hits in the 1960s. Their main successes included "Pobre Menina", "Devolva-me" and "Eu Não Sabia Que Você Existia", all composed by Renato Barros, the leader of the group Renato e Seus Blue Caps. They are also known for the song "Coisinha Estúpida", covered by her and Leno and originally wrote by Carson Parks. She became known in her solo career for the single "Sou Rebelde".

She has had 370 songs recorded by various artists.

== Career ==
Lílian met Leno at 6 years old and they began to sing together at 15 when they were neighbors in the Copacabana neighborhood of Rio de Janeiro. In 1965, they formed the duo Leno & Lílian, having hits until the duo disbanded in 1967. They composed the hit "Devolva-me" when they were 15. In 1966, Lílian became the first woman to compose an original rock song in Portuguese, titled “O Pica Pau”, originally recorded by Erasmo Carlos.

She remained outside the artistic world until she returned with Leno in 1972. They ended the partnership again in 1974 and began a solo artistic career afterwards. At the end of the 1970s, she took up her career again and released her song “Sou rebelde”, a Portuguese version of the hit song "Soy Rebelde" by English-Spanish singer Jeanette. This version was written by Paulo Coelho at the request of Roberto Livi, who bet on the success on the cover and saw to it that Lílian would sing the song using a miniskirt and making the face of a “naive girl”, in a way captivating the public. The album launched and sold more than three million copies.

During this time period, she posed nude on a special edition of the magazine Homem, published by Idéia Editorial. Her most recently released album was Lílian Knapp, released in 2001.

In 2008, she launched the underground rock project "Kynna", with guitarist Luis Carlini and her husband, drummer Cadu Nolla, recording works with artists such as Jupiter Apple, Graforreia Xilarmônica, Bidê ou Balde, and Autoramas. They released the album "Underground" independently.

== Personal life ==
During the time of the Jovem Guarda, Lílian dated Renato Barros, a composer and lead singer and founder of the band Renato e Seus Blue Caps. At the end of the 1980s, she married drummer and musical producer Cadu Nolla.

=== Death ===
Lílian died on the night of 22 February 2025 at 76. She had been hospitalized at the ICU due to an aggressive pelvic tumor.

== Discography ==
=== Leno e Lílian ===
==== Studio albums ====
- 1966 - Leno e Lilian
- 1967 - Não Acredito
- 1972 - Leno e Lilian
- 1973 - Leno e Lilian

==== Singles ====
- 1966 - "Devolva-me" / "Pobre Menina"
- 1967 - "Está Pra Nascer" / "Não Vai Passar"
- 1967 - "Coisinha Estúpida" / "Um Novo Amor Surgirá"

==== EPs ====
- 1966 - Leno e Lilian
- 1967 - Leno e Lilian - Vol. II
- 1967 - Não Acredito
- 1968 - Não Acredito - Vol. II

==== Collections ====
- 1966 - As 14 Mais - Vol. XVIII, with "Devolva-me" e "Pobre Menina"
- 1967 - As 14 Mais - Vol. XIX with "Está pra Nascer" and "Não Vai Passar"
- 1967 - As 14 Mais - Vol. XX with "Não Acredito" and "Parem Tudo"

=== Solo career ===
==== Studio ====
- 1979 - Lílian
- 1992 - Lílian
- 2001 - Lílian Knapp

==== Singles ====
- 1974 - "Como Se Fosse Meu Irmão" / "Pra Onde É Que Você Vai?"
- 1976 - "Meu Nego" / "Hoje Eu Preciso"
- 1978 - "Sou Rebelde" / "Eu Sem Você"
- 1979 - "Uma Música Lenta" / "Hoje e Amanhã"
- 1980 - "Vai Voltar" / "Eu Te Espero"
- 1981 - "Esta Noite" / "Feliz, Feliz, Feliz Comigo"
- 1981 - "Das 9 às 5" / "Acho Que Eu Gosto Mesmo É de Sofrer"
- 1981 - "Frente a Frente" / "Amar Você pra Sempre"
- 1982 - "Gaivota" / "Homem Pássaro"
- 1983 - "O Sonho" / "Não Dá Mais Pé"

==== EPs ====
- 1980 - "Vai Voltar" / "Amor Inconstante" / "Quero Te Dar Amor" / "Como Duas Crianças"
- 1982 - "Das 9 às 5" / "Acho Que Eu Gosto Mesmo É de Sofrer" / "Frente a Frente" / "Amar Você Pra Sempre"

==== Collections ====
- 1995 - 30 Anos de Jovem Guarda - Vol. 5 com as canções "Lacinhos Cor de Rosa", "Pobre Menina", and "Devolva-me", the latter two being duos with Ed Wilson.

== Bibliography ==
- Barcinski, André (2014). Pavões Misteriosos — 1974-1983: A explosão da música pop no Brasil. Editora Três Estrelas. ISBN 978-85-653-3929-2.
