= Cidinha Campos =

Brazilian politician and radio and TV personality

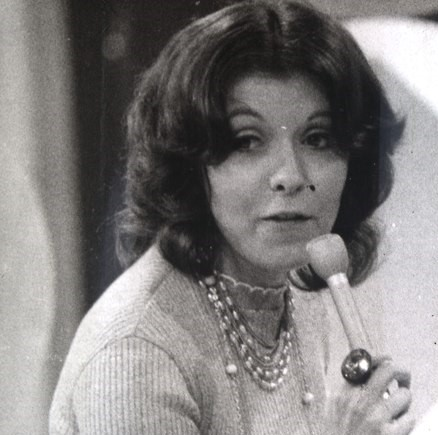
- In office February 1992 – January 1999

Federal Deputy for Rio de Janeiro
- In office February 1999 – January 2019

Deputy in the Legislative Assembly of Rio de Janeiro

Personal details
- Born: Maria Aparecida Campos; 5 September 1942 (age 84) São Paulo, Brazil
- Party: Democratic Labour Party
- Spouse(s): 1. Manoel Carlos; 2. Ricardo Strauss (1973- )
- Occupation: Radio and television broadcaster; actress

Cidinha Campos (born 1942) is a Brazilian journalist and radio and television broadcaster. She has also been a politician affiliated to Brazil's Democratic Labour Party (Portuguese: Partido Democrático Trabalhista, PDT) since 1982, serving terms as a Federal Deputy to the National Congress of Brazil and as a Deputy in the Legislative Assembly of Rio de Janeiro state. She is noted for her campaigns against corruption and her work in favour of consumer rights.

== Early life ==
Maria Aparecida Campos Straus, better known as Cidinha Campos, was born in São Paulo on 5 September 1942. Her father owned a grocery store. When she was around 5 years old, her mother won an unofficial lottery and the family visited Portugal. There she stayed with her mother's family for about a year. By the time she returned to Brazil, she was speaking Portuguese like a native of Portugal. In her street there was a teacher, whose young daughter was a radio star. When he heard Campos speaking and singing with a Portuguese accent, he arranged for her to sing on Clube Papai Noel, a show broadcast on Rádio Difusora in São Paulo. The show was performed before a live audience and Campos dressed up as a Portuguese fado singer. She then appeared on television in soap operas and was also a TV presenter on children's programmes, first on Super Rádio Tupi until 1955 and then on Record TV until 1970. Campos attended secondary school at Colégio Pais Leme in São Paulo and graduated as a pianist at the Conservatório Dramático e Musical de São Paulo.

== Career ==
The current affairs programme on RecordTV that Campos presented proved important for her career. She interviewed famous people, such as Jean Genet, Claudia Cardinale, Alberto Sordi, Alain Delon and Jean Paul Sartre. With an interest in sport, she covered the 1970 FIFA World Cup, held in Mexico. In 1971, she then moved to Rio de Janeiro where, in addition to working with TV Tupi, she was to be a sports correspondent for Jornal dos Sports. In 1973-74 she worked with TV Globo before becoming a theatrical producer. The comedian, singer and writer, Juca Chaves, then suggested that she perform and this gave rise to Homen Não Entra (No Men Allowed), a monologue performance, with which she toured Brazil. It is considered to have been the first theatrical performance to ban the entry of men. The show provoked intense controversy and ended up being banned by the Federal Police, on the grounds that the discrimination against men was unconstitutional. In 1978, Campos returned to Rádio Tupi in Rio de Janeiro, with the programme Cidinha Livre, which gave advice and help to listeners. She established herself as a communicator with great popular empathy, one who had a commitment to obtaining benefits for her listeners, most of them low-income workers.

== Political activities ==
Cidinha Campos in 2022.

In 1982, she interviewed Leonel Brizola, a candidate for governor of Rio de Janeiro state. Persuaded by his ideas, she participated in his successful election campaign. She was elected federal deputy to the National Congress of Brazil in Brasília in October 1990 and sworn in in February 1991, as a member of the Democratic Labour Party, representing Rio de Janeiro state. With policies that included guarantees for domestic servants, opposition to the death penalty, and the legalization of abortion, she received over 300,000 votes, the highest number by one candidate in the country. At the time the Brazilian president was Fernando Collor de Mello. One of her first acts after election was to demand his impeachment for refusing to pay agreed inflation adjustments for pensions. The Chamber voted to impeach him for corruption in September 1992, and he resigned in December of the same year. In her time as a federal deputy, she prioritized the fight against corruption, notably that in the Instituto Nacional do Seguro Social (National Social Security Institute - INSS), and made numerous demands for government officers accused of corruption to be sacked. She encountered considerable retaliation. For example, she was accused of having benefited from Rio de Janeiro state's administrative machinery during her 1992 campaign and was sentenced to be ineligible to serve in the Chamber for three years. On appeal, this judgement was suspended. In July 1994, in protest against her candidacy for re-election being declared invalid, she camped in front of the Rio de Janeiro Court of Justice and started a hunger strike. Campos has been sued on 33 occasions for "moral damage".

In 1992 Campos ran unsuccessfully for the position of mayor of Rio de Janeiro, despite early opinion polls having put her ahead of other candidates. In 1993, she was part of the special external commission that investigated political disappearances during the military regime (1964-1985). After two terms as a federal deputy, she became a deputy in the Legislative Assembly of Rio de Janeiro, in which she served from 1999 to 2019. This gave her the opportunity to restart her media career, first on radio, with a programme called Programa Cidinha Livre, in which she aimed to address problems faced by people in Rio de Janeiro state, and then, from 2010 to 2012, on television, with a programme on Rede Bandeirantes that had similar aims.

In the state assembly Campos became known as one of the most combative deputies. The author of more than 40 laws, she authored the law that requires every public hospital in Rio de Janeiro state to be able to perform mammographies and bone density exams, as well as a law that prohibits people being searched on entering banks. She denounced numerous acts of corruption, including in areas such as private pension provision and advertising expenditure by the state government, and in some cases was successful in having people removed from office and convicted.

Campos chaired the Assembly's Consumer Defence Commission for 10 years, which, among other things, created "consumer buses", that provided a mobile service to listen to the population's complaints. Under her tenure, the Commission resolved more than 130,000 cases. In 2013, she was asked by the then governor, Sérgio Cabral Filho, to run the State Department for Consumer Protection and Defence (Seprocon). In 2014 she was successful in passing legislation to increase penalties against companies that broke the law. In 2016, she was an unsuccessful candidate to be deputy mayor in Rio de Janeiro. She failed to be re-elected to the state assembly in 2019, receiving many fewer votes than in previous elections and in 2020 resumed her broadcasting career on Super Rádio Tupi.

== Personal life ==
Campos married the novelist and screenwriter, Manoel Carlos. Their daughter, Maria Carolina, is also a well-known screenwriter. Since 1973, Campos has been married to Ricardo Straus, and they have a son.
