= Diana (singer) =

Brazilian singer (1948–2024)

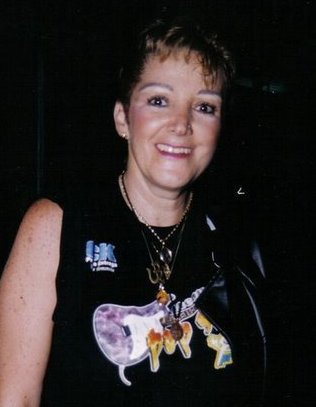
- Diana at a concert in Feira de Santana, Bahia, Brazil

Background information
- Also known as: Dianah
- Born: Ana Maria Siqueira Iorio; 2 June 1948; Rio de Janeiro, Federal District, Brazil
- Died: 21 August 2024 (aged 76) Araruama, Rio de Janeiro, Brazil
- Genres: Jovem Guarda pop
- Occupations: Singer-songwriter; musician
- Instrument: Vocals
- Years active: 1969–2024

Ana Maria Siqueira Iorio (2 June 1948 – 21 August 2024), known by the stage name Diana, was a Brazilian singer who gained fame in the 1970s. She was born Ana Maria Siqueira Iorio, in Botafogo neighbourhood, in Rio de Janeiro city, at 2 June, and raised in the Leblon neighbourhood. Her fans gave her the nickname "The Love Singer of Brazil". Her song styles are Jovem Guarda and Brazilian Pop.

== Career ==
Diana began her career in the late 1960s, following in the footsteps of "Jovem Guarda". At 1969, she recorded her first single, "Menti Pra Você" (I Lied For You) (Side A) and "Sítio do Pica-Pau Amarelo" (Yellow Woodpecker's Farm) (Side B). In 1970, she recorded another single on the EPIC label, with two songs, called "Não Chore Baby" (Don't Cry Baby) and "Eu Gosto Dele" (I Like Him), produced by Raul Seixas. Odair José also recorded a song written by her: "Mundo Feito de Saudade" (World Made By Missings).

=== Success ===
Diana continued working and recording in 1971 and 1972, and finally secured a contract with the CBS Label, replacing Wanderléa. With Raul's production, Diana had hits with the songs "Uma Vez Mais" (One Last Time), "Fatalidade" (Fatality), "Um Mundo Só Pra Nós" (A World Just To We Both), "Porque Brigamos" (Why We Are Troubled), "Estou Completamente Apaixonada" (I Am Completely in Love) and "Hoje Sonhei Com Você" (Today I Dreamed With You).

=== New Musical stage ===
By now Raul Seixas had his own solo career, and dedicated his time to his own productions. In 1974, Diana changed to another label, looking for liberty to record her own compositions. At Polydor label, she recorded three albums between 1974 and 1976 producing the hits "Foi Tudo Culpa do Amor" (Was All Love's Blame), "Uma Nova Vida" (A New Life) and "Lero-Lero" (Idle Talk).

In 1978 she recorded for an album on the RCA label that included the songs "Vida Que Não Pára" (Life That Doesn't Stop), composed by Odair José, interpreted by Diana. During the 1980s, Diana recorded several more singles and albums, including "Pra Sempre" (Forever).

== Personal life and death ==
At the beginning of their careers, Diana and the singer Odair José married, but after a troubled relationship, they divorced amid significant media attention. They had a daughter, Clarice, in the early years of their relationship.

In 2010, Diana adopted the new stage name Dianah. She declared the intention to record a new CD, a live DVD and to release an autobiography.

Diana later lived in Região dos Lagos (Lakes Region), at Araruama Ville. She died in Araruama on 21 August 2024, at the age of 76.
