= Raimundo Sodré =

Raimundo Nonato Pereira Sodré

Background information
- Born: Raimundo Nonato Pereira Sodré; July 23, 1947; Ipirá, Bahia, Brazil
- Genres: Roots music, Samba-de-roda, Samba-chula, Baiãos
- Occupation: Musician
- Instruments: Guitar, Drums
- Years active: 1980–present
- Labels: PolyGram, Tropical Music

Raimundo Nonato Pereira Sodré (born 23 July 1947 in Ipirá, Bahia), is a Brazilian musician known for working in seminal styles of music outside of the mainstream. He was raised by his mother, filha-de-santo in a terreiro of candomblé Angola outside of Ipirá run by her mãe-de-santo sister (Sodré's aunt). It was in this house of candomblé that Sodré learned to drum. He later learned to play guitar, taught at first by his mother.

At the age of seven Sodré moved together with his mother to the capital of Salvador, settling in the neighborhood of São Caetano. His holidays were spent with his father in Santo Amaro, Bahia (his father never did marry his mother), and he and his mother made frequent trips back to Ipirá as well. It was in Santa Amaro and Ipirá that Sodré absorbed the styles of music for which he later became famous, samba-de-roda and samba-chula, and the baiãos of Luiz Gonzaga and Jackson do Pandeiro.

In 1980 Sodré achieved nationwide success with his hit "A Massa"—a song based in chula—after placing third in a nationally televised talent competition. This success was short-lived however; Sodré spoke openly and critically of a powerful Brazilian politician who had come to power during the dictatorship (1964-1985), and pressure was brought to bear on Sodré's record company (PolyGram). With no support his next two records -- Coisa de Nego and Beijo Moreno—sold poorly.

In 1990 Sodré was invited to participate in the carnival in Nice, France, and later that year he returned to France for Le Carnaval Brésilien at Cirque d'Hiver. Sodré stayed, playing bars in France, England, Germany, Italy, and Switzerland, and travelling in Africa. In 1994 he recorded the album Real for German label Tropical Music.

In the year 2000 Sodré returned to Bahia to live permanently, where in 2005 he recorded and independently released the album Dengo, and where he continues to intermittently play shows.

In 2007 Raimundo Sodré took part in the Born to Samba tour through Hamburg, Munich and Zurich.
