= Orkestra Rumpilezz =

- Origin: Salvador, Bahia, Brazil
- Genres: Afro-jazz, instrumental, pop, samba, percussive, jazz
- Years active: 2006-present
- Labels: Biscoito Fino e Caco Discos
- Website: www.rumpilezz.com

The Orkestra Rumpilezz is an orchestra of percussion and brass created in 2006 by Letieres Leite (1959-2021). The group's first album won the Bravo! Award for Best Popular Album of the Year 2010 and the Brazilian Music Award in the categories Best New Artist and Best Instrumental Group.

It's about a group of instrumental folk music in which music is attributed to the ancestral music from Bahia in a harmonic modern garb, percussion with African roots and under the influence of modern jazz. Both compositions and arrangements are conceived from drawings and rhythm of the claves from the percussive universe of Bahia - inspired in large associations such as the percussive Ile Aiye, Olodum, Sambas Recôncavo, among others - with the influence of Candomblé.

The Orchestra consists of five percussionists (drums, timbau, agogo, tambourine, caxixi) and 14 wind instrument players (four trumpets, four trombones, two alto sax, two tenor sax, a baritone sax and one tuba).

Important names of world music already attended concerts of the Orkestra Rumpilezz: Carlinhos Brown, Ed Motta, Stanley Jordan, Toninho Horta, David Moraes and others.

== The teacher ==
In 1979, Letieres Leite initiated his studies by himself, and discovered a vocation in wind instruments such as the flute and saxophone. He received his degree from the Federal University of Bahia. In 1987, he continued his studies at the Konservatorium Franz Schubert in Vienna - Austria. Since then, Letieres has performed with innumerable musicians and in festivals in Europe and Brazil. He has recorded with such artists as Nico Assumpção, Nana Vasconcelos, Gilberto Gil, Elba Ramalho, Lulu Santos, Timbalada, Daniela Mercury, Elza Soares, Hermeto Pascoal, Stanley Jordan, Carlinhos Brown, Toninho Horta, Arthur Maia, Marcio Montarroios and the singer Ivete Sangalo (in whose band he played tenor sax). He contributed performances to eight albums and three DVDs, including one at Madison Square Garden in New York City. Letieres continued to work as producer and musical manager for Sangalo.

== Discography ==
- 2009 - Letieres Leite & Orkestra Rumpilezz
- 2016 - A Saga Da Travessia

== Awards ==
- 21º Brazilian Music Award (Best Instrumental Group and Best New Artist of the Year)
- Bravo! Award (Best Popular Album)
- Funarte
- Cultural Itaú
- Gold Medal Quality of Brazil Musical
- Natura (National Tour)
- The Globe (Best in music in 2010)
- 3rd Best of 2010 by Folha de S.Paulo
