= Leno & Lílian =

- Origin: Rio de Janeiro, Brazil
- Genres: Rock; Pop; Jovem Guarda; iê-iê-iê
- Years active: 1965–1967; 1972–1974
- Label: CBS
- Past members: Leno; Lílian

Leno & Lílian was a Brazilian musical duo made up of singers Leno Azevedo and Lílian Knapp. They began performing in the 1960s as part of the Jovem Guarda, a time in which they had several hits.

== History ==
Leno & Lílian had known each other since they were 6 years old and began to sing together at 15 when they were neighbors in the Copacabana neighborhood of Rio de Janeiro.

In 1966, the duo began to perform on Jovem Guarda, and afterwards would release their first album with the songs "Pobre Menina" and "Devolva-me". The album, which contained rock and iê-iê-iê songs, was a major hit in Brazil. Their first LP was recorded soon after, and included the aforementioned songs, along with another hit, "Eu Não Sabia Que Você Existia".

In 1968, the group separated, with Leno and Lílian recording in their solo careers to relative success. In 1972, they returned to perform together. During this period, they released songs produced and composed by Raul Seixas, Renato Barros, and other authors, along with their own compositions. In 1972 and 1973, they recorded two albums.

Since the 1970s and 1970s, they developed their own solo careers, with some brief reunions. In 1979, Lílian had a massive hit with "Sou Rebelde". During this time, she posed nude for a special edition of the magazine Homem, released by Idéia Editorial. During the 1990s, Leno & Lílian participated in commemorative shows to celebrate 30 years of the Jovem Guarda and perform either together or separately. Some albums by the duo and individual ones by Leno were rereleased on CD. On 21 June 2015, after a hiatus of 10 years, the duo performed at Virada Cultural in São Paulo.

== Discography ==
=== Studio albums ===
- 1966 - Leno e Lilian
- 1967 - Não Acredito
- 1972 - Leno e Lilian
- 1973 - Leno e Lilian

=== Singles ===
- 1966 - Devolva-me / Pobre Menina
- 1967 - Está Pra Nascer / Não Vai Passar
- 1967 - Coisinha Estúpida / Um Novo Amor Surgirá

=== EPs ===
- 1966 - Leno e Lilian
- 1967 - Leno e Lilian - Vol. II
- 1967 - Não Acredito
- 1968 - Não Acredito - Vol. II

=== Collections ===
- 1966 - As 14 Mais - Vol. XVIII with Devolva-me and Pobre Menina
- 1967 - As 14 Mais - Vol. XIX with Está pra Nascer and Não Vai Passar
- 1967 - As 14 Mais - Vol. XX with Não Acredito and Parem Tudo
