= Áurea Martins =

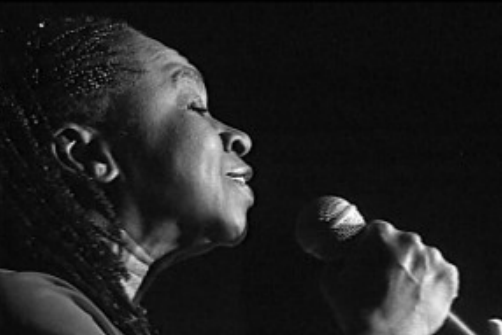
- Pereira in 2013

Background information
- Born: Áldima Pereira dos Santos; 13 June 1940 (age 85); Rio de Janeiro, Brazil
- Genres: MPB; Samba
- Occupation: Singer

Áldima Pereira dos Santos, known artistically as Áurea Martins (born 13 June 1940), is a Brazilian singer.

== Biography ==
Martins was born on 13 June 1940 in Rio de Janeiro, in the neighborhood of Campo Grande. She was born to a family of musical artists: her father played the guitar, her grandmother the banjo; Her mother was an amateur singer and two of her uncles played the saxophone and clarinet. Áurea participated, when she was a child, the choir at Igreja de Nossa Senhora do Desterro.

She got her artistic name from Paulo Gracindo when she played on radio programs with Rádio Nacional in the 1960s. In 1969, she won the televised contest A Grande Chance with Flavio Cavalcanti. The singer Maysa Matarazzo was among the jurors. With the prize money, Martins financed her first LP, O Amor em Paz, in 1972, with compositions by Luiz Eça.

After this initial foray, the singer would, for a long time, perform mainly in the Bohemian circuit in Rio de Janeiro. With the 2008 album Até Sangrar, she returned to the national music scene, winning the Brazilian Music Awards for Best Singer in 2009. Marisa Monte and Rosa Passos were among her fellow contestants. That same year, the filmmaker Zeca Ferreira released the short Áurea, which shows a regular workday for the artist at night and received more than 20 awards since its release. Her song "Nada Pode me Parar Agora" was used as the ending theme for the final episode of the anime Michiko & Hatchin.

In 2012, Martins released her first DVD with the recording of a show in the studio. Her 2022 album, Senhora das Folhas, was nominated for Best Portuguese Language Roots Album at the 2022 Latin Grammys.

== Discography ==
- (1972) O amor em paz • RCA • LP
- (1990) Bordões • Top Voice • CD
- (2003) Áurea Martins • Independent • CD
- (2003) Outros ventos • Independent • CD
- (2007) Até Sangrar • Biscoito Fino • CD
- (2007) Orquestra Lunar • Rádio MEC • CD
- (2010) Depontacabeça • Biscoito Fino • CD
- (2012) Iluminante • Biscoito Fino • CD
- (2022) Senhora das Folhas
