= Osvaldo Nunes =

- Born: 1 December 1930; Rio de Janeiro, Brazil
- Died: 18 June 1991 (aged 60) Rio de Janeiro, Brazil
- Genres: Samba
- Occupations: Singer, Songwriter

Osvaldo Nunes (1 December 1930 – 18 June 1991), also credited as Oswaldo Nunes, was a Brazilian samba singer and songwriter.

== Life ==
Oswaldo Nunes was born in Rio de Janeiro, and did not know his parents, being raised in charity orphanage houses & working a variety of street-level jobs. In adulthood, he attended samba schools and carnival blocks, leading to an artistic career. In 1951, his first songwriting contribution occurred, and in 1962 he recorded his first album. His breakthrough song "Oba", also recorded later in 1962, played heavily at carnival parades and led to subsequent album releases. In the later half of the 1960s he performed many times with The Pops, a known Jovem Guarda pop-rock group from Jacaré, Rio de Janeiro, eventually releasing an album with them in 1969 called "Tá Tudo Aí!". Additionally, he was a winner of multiple Carnival song competitions.

== Death ==
On 18 June 1991, he was murdered in unclear circumstances in his Rio de Janeiro apartment.
