= Odair José =

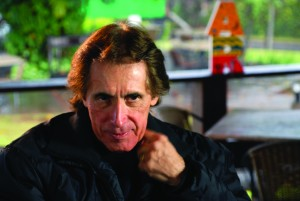

Background information
- Also known as: Pílula; O Terror das Empregadas; Bob Dylan do Central do Brasil
- Born: Odair José de Araújo; 16 August 1948 (age 78); Morrinhos, Goiás, Brazil
- Genres: Rock; Hard rock; MPB; Romantic music
- Occupations: Singer, composer, multi-instrumentalist
- Instruments: Guitar, piano, harmonica
- Years active: 1970—present

Odair José de Araújo (born 16 August 1948) is Brazilian singer and composer, mainly of a pop-romantic style.

He came into prominence in the Brazilian music scene in the 1970s. With a career spanning 50 years and 80 million records sold, he has released more than 40 albums, including originals, live albums, collections, and Spanish versions of his music.

== Biography ==
Odair José was born on 16 August 1948 in Morrinhos, Goiás. He is the son of Conceição José de Araújo and Antônia das Dores Rodrigues, and was raised in a rural part of Morrinhos, later moving to the city at 6 years old. He began his artistic career in adolescence as a crooner until he was 17 and a half, when he began to compose.

While still young, he moved to Rio de Janeiro, in search of greater notoriety in the national music scene. While in Rio, he met Rossini Pinto, a composer and producer who saw potential in Odair, taking him to the record label CBS. His debut work was the song "Minhas Coisas", which was included in the album As 14 Mais, one of the main products of the company in that time period. In 1972, Odair recorded the songs "Eu vou tirar você deste lugar", "Esta noite você vai ter que ser minha"; "Pense pelo menos em nossos filhos" and "Cristo quem é você", recorded by Odair José himself, with arrangements by Zé Rodrix, and with the participation of Som Imaginário. All of these were included on the album Assim Sou Eu..., released by Polydor.

The following year, in 1973, his LP, Odair José, was released. Songs such as "Uma Vida Só (Pare de Tomar a Pílula)" and "Eu, Você e Praça" were among the most played that year. "Uma Vida Só" in particular became popularly known for its refrain, "stop taking the pill", which was censured by the Brazilian military dictatorship at the time, for the supposed understanding that the song had made "propaganda" against the distribution of such pills for birth control. A song that had strong public support as well was "Deixa Essa Vergonha De Lado", where Odair José gave his total support to domestic workers, which had not been legalized by the 1970s. After releasing various albums, he composed and recorded O Filho de José e Maria in 1977. Despite all of the controversy surrounding the project, Odair affirmed that he did not regret having made it and having composed, recorded, and presented to the public his opera. He was excommunicated by the Catholic Church in 1978 because of the album. The excommunication made him record songs without much a political message for the next 20 years.

Despite the lack of appreciation of the album at the time and the scandals surrounding the album, it was rediscovered and seen as a great innovation in music at the time. In 2017, journalist Mauro Ferreira referred to the album as the "first rock opera album in the Brazilian pop universe". In 1979, Odair had the song "Até parece um sonho" included in the soundtrack for the Rede Globo telenovela Cabocla.

Having returned to media since the end of the 1990s, Odair José has continued to record songs on delicate subjects such as sex, drugs, and prostitution, as well as protest against problems in Brazil.

In 2006, he was the theme of a tribute that reunited all the main groups of new Brazilian pop-rock groups. These bands had made remakes of various hits by the artists, resulting in the album Vou tirar você deste lugar, released by Allegro Discos, with the presence of names such as Paulo Miklos, Zeca Baleiro, Pato Fu, Mombojó, and Mundo Livre S/A, among others. That same year, he released Só pode ser amor o que sinto, that had contained "Bebo e Choro", including in the soundtrack for the film Trair e coçar é só começar and the Record telenovela Bicho do Mato.

He was the subject of a 2009 episode of The Strange World of Coffin Joe, an interview program shown on Canal Brasil and presented by José Mojica Marins. After a hiatus of 6 years, he returned with Praça Tiradentes (2012), produced by Zeca Baleiro. In 2014, 2014, Odair José declared that his albums released by EMI were "a shit by my own fault. I just wanted to know how to drink and smoke marijuana".

In 2015, he released the album Dia 16, and launched Gatos e Ratos the year after, which was nominated for Best Album in the Pop Music category at the 2017 Brazilian Music Awards. In the same award ceremony, he was the winner in the Best Singer category. Even further, Rolling Stone Brasil dubbed the album the 20th best Brazilian album of 2016.

In 2019, Odair José released Hibernar na Casa das Moças Ouvindo Rádio with the record label Monstro Discos, which was named one of the 25 best Brazilian albums of the first semester of 2019 by the São Paulo Art Critics Association.

In 2021, he composed 6 songs with Arnaldo Antunes for the soundtrack for the film Meu Álbum de Amores.

In 2025, he was awarded with the Ordem do Mérito Cultural. That same year, he won the category for Best Romantic Artist at the 2025 Brazilian Music Awards.

== Personal life ==
Odair José was married to singer and composer Diana, whom he met at the end of the 1960s when they were both starting off their careers. The marriage officially occurred in 1973, but it lasted only a short time and ended in a troubled manner, occupying the pages of newspapers in 1974 and 1975 due to violent fights between them.

In 1976, their daughter, Clarice Iório de Araújo, was born. They divorced and would separate definitively in 1981; later interviewed by a blog, he claimed that, according to lawyer Paulo Lins e Silva, they were the 4th couple to divorce in Brazil.

After divorcing, he met Jane de Freitas shortly after, whom he later married. They had two sons: Odair José de Araújo Junior and Raphael Freitas de Araújo.

== Discography ==
- 1970 - Odair José (CBS/Sony Music)
- 1971 - Meu Grande Amor (CBS/Sony Music)
- 1972 - Assim sou eu... (Polydor/Universal Music)
- 1973 - Odair José (Polydor/Universal Music)
- 1974 - Lembranças (Polydor/Universal Music)
- 1975 - Amantes (em castelhano) (Polydor/Universal Music)
- 1975 - Odair (Polydor/Universal Music)
- 1976 - Histórias e Pensamentos (Polydor/Universal Music)
- 1977 - O Filho de José e Maria (RCA/Sony Music)
- 1978 - Coisas Simples (RCA/Sony Music)
- 1979 - Odair José (Continental)
- 1980 - Odair José (Continental)
- 1981 - Viva e deixe viver (EMI)
- 1982 - Só por amor (EMI)
- 1983 - Fome de amor (EMI)
- 1984 - Eu, você e o sofá (EMI)
- 1985 - Odair José (EMI)
- 1986 - Odair José (RGE)
- 1987 - Odair José (RGE)
- 1989 - Odair José (RGE)
- 1990 - Odair José (Copacabana)
- 1992 - Odair José (Copacabana)
- 1993 - Odair José (Harmony Records/Sony Music)
- 1994 - Luz Acesa (Warner Music Group)
- 1996 - As minhas canções (Polydor/Universal Music)
- 1997 - Lágrimas (Bahamas Songs)
- 1999 - Ao Vivo (Polydor/Universal Music)
- 2002 - Uma História (Polydisc)
- 2003 - Passado Presente (Gema)
- 2004 - 20 Super Sucessos (coletânea com regravações inéditas) (Polydisc)
- 2006 - Só Pode Ser Amor (Deckdisc)
- 2012 - Praça Tiradentes (Saravá Discos)
- 2014 - O Filho de José e Maria - Ao Vivo (Coqueiro Verde)
- 2015 - Dia 16 (Saravá Discos)
- 2016 - Gatos e Ratos (Independente)
- 2019 - Hibernar Na Casa Das Moças Ouvindo Rádio (Monstro Discos)
- 2024 - Seres Humanos (e a Inteligência Artificial) (Monstro Discos)
