= Renato Barros =

- Born: Renato Cosme Vieira de Barros; 27 September 1943; Rio de Janeiro, Brazil
- Died: 28 July 2020 (aged 76) Rio de Janeiro, Brazil
- Genres: Rock; Jovem Guarda; iê-iê-iê
- Occupations: Singer, composer, guitarist
- Years active: 1958–2020

Renato Cosme Vieira de Barros (27 September 1943 — 28 July 2020) was a Brazilian singer, composer, and guitarist, best known for his work as the lead vocalist, guitarist, and one of the founders of the band Renato e Seus Blue Caps.

Among his compositions included "Devolva-me", initially recorded by Leno & Lílian and was made further successful by a re-recording by Adriana Calcanhotto.

He was included in Rolling Stone Brasil’s 30 biggest Brazilian guitarist icons in 2012.

== Death ==
Barros died on 28 July 2020 in Rio de Janeiro at 76 years old due to a pulmonary infection.
