= Renato e Seus Blue Caps =

Brazilian Rock Band

- Also known as: Bacaninhas do Rock da Piedade
- Origin: Rio de Janeiro, Brazil
- Genres: Rock
- Years active: Late 1950s-July 2020

Renato e Seus Blue Caps (also known as Bacaninhas do Rock da Piedade) is a Brazilian rock band formed in Rio de Janeiro in the late 1950s. They are described in their AllMusic biography as one of the most important groups of the Jovem Guarda movement, and they have written many Portuguese language versions of The Beatles' songs.

The first name was censored on the radio and Jair de Taumaturgo suggested the final name, inspired by Gene Vincent and His Blue Caps.

Renato Barros died in July 2020.

== Discography ==
- (1962) "Multiplicação/Limbo do Trá-lá-lá" (Som)
- (1962) Twist com Renato e Seus Blue Caps (Som)
- (1963) "Boogie do bebê/Limbo rock" (Copacabana)
- (1963) Renato e Seus Blue Caps (Som)
- (1964) "Vera Lúcia/Noturno/Bigorrilho/We like birdland" (CBS)
- (1965) Viva a juventude (CBS)
- (1965) "Menina linda/Canto pra fingir" (CBS)
- (1965) Viva a juventude, vol. II (CBS)
- (1965) "O escândalo/Preciso ser feliz" (CBS)
- (1965) Isto é Renato e Seus Blue Caps (CBS)
- (1966) Isto é Renato e Seus Blue Caps (CBS)
- (1966) Um embalo com Renato e Seus Blue Caps (CBS)
- (1966) Isto é Renato e Seus Blue Caps, Vol. II (CBS)
- (1967) Um embalo com Renato e Seus Blue Caps, vol. II (CBS)
- (1967) Um embalo com Renato e Seus Blue Caps, vol. III (CBS)
- (1967) Renato e Seus Blue Caps (CBS)
- (1968) Renato e Seus Blue Caps, vol. II (CBS)
- (1968) Especial (CBS)
- (1969) Renato e Seus Blue Caps (CBS)
- (1970) Renato e Seus Blue Caps (CBS)
- (1971) Renato e Seus Blue Caps (CBS)
- (1972) Renato e Seus Blue Caps (CBS)
- (1973) Renato e Seus Blue Caps (CBS)
- (1974) Renato e Seus Blue Caps (CBS)
- (1976) 10 anos de Renato e Seus Blue Caps (CBS)
- (1977) Renato e Seus Blue Caps (CBS)
- (1979) "Minha vida/Nega, neguinha" (CBS)
- (1979) Suco de laranja (CBS)
- (1981) Renato e Seus Blue Caps (CBS)
- (1982) "Memórias/Colcha de retalhos" (RCA)
- (1983) Pra sempre (RCA Victor)
- (1987) Batom vermelho (Continental)
- (1994) Baton Vermelho (Warner Music Group)
- (2002) Série as Melhores (Sony Music Distribution)
- (2005) Renato & Seus Blue Caps (Movieplay Music)
- (2008) Jovem Guarda: Baton Vermelho (WEA)
