= Fresno discography =

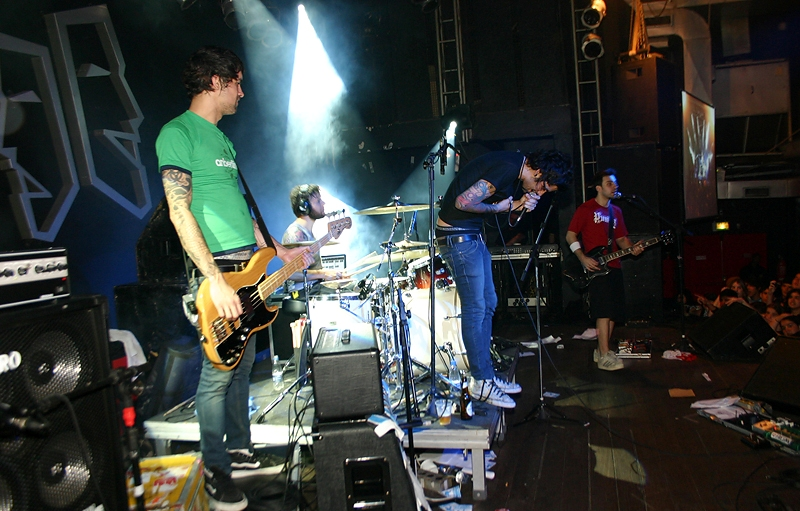
- Studio albums: 11
- Extended plays: 3
- Live albums: 7
- Compilation albums: 1 (Mixtape)
- Singles: 41
- Video albums: 3
- Music videos: 33

The discography of Fresno, a Brazilian emo band, consists of eleven studio albums, four EPs, seven live albums, three video albums, one mixtape and forty one singles.

In 2001 they released their first EP, and between 2003 and 2026 released eleven studio albums.

== Albums ==
=== Studio albums ===
Year	Album details
2003	Quarto dos Livros (Book Room): Released: 2003; Label: Sweet Salt, Antimídia; Format: CD, digital download
2004	O Rio, A Cidade, A Árvore (The River, The City, The Tree): Released: 2004; Label: RCT, Antídoto; Format: CD, digital download
2005	Ciano (Cyan): Released: 2005; Label: Terapia Records; Format: CD, digital download
2008	Redenção (Redemption): Released: May 15, 2008; Label: Universal Music, Arsenal Music; Format: CD, digital download
2010	Revanche (Revenge): Released: 2010; Label: Universal Music, Arsenal Music; Format: CD, digital download
2012	Infinito (Infinite): Released: 2012; Label: Independent release; Format: CD, digital download
2016	A Sinfonia de Tudo Que Há (The Symphony Of Everything That Exists): Released: 2016; Label: BMG; Format: CD, digital download
2019	Sua Alegria Foi Cancelada (Your Joy Has Been Canceled): Released: 2019; Label: BMG; Format: CD, digital download
2021	Vou Ter Que Me Virar (I Will Have To Make Do): Released: 2021; Label: BMG; Format: CD, digital download
2024	Eu Nunca Fui Embora (I Have Never Left): Released: 2024 (released in two parts); Label: Fresno/Elemess; Format: CD, digital download
2026	Carta de Adeus (Goodbye Letter): Released: 2024 (released in two parts); Label: Fresno/Elemess; Format: CD, digital download

=== Mixtapes ===
Year	Album details
2021	Inventário (Inventary): Released: 2021; Label: BMG; Format: CD, digital download

=== Live albums ===
Year	Album details
2007	MTV Ao Vivo 5 Bandas de Rock: Released: June 30, 2007; Label: Universal Music, Arsenal Music; Format: CD, digital download
2015	15 Anos Ao Vivo: Released: April 23, 2015; Label: Sony; Format: CD, digital download
2016	Ciano Ao Vivo: Released: September 05, 2016; Label: BMG; Format: Digital download
2019	Natureza Caos: Live: Released: February 22, 2019; Label: BMG; Format: CD, digital download
2023	VTQMV Tour (Live): Released: May 19, 2023; Label: BMG; Format: CD, digital download
2023	Quarto Dos Livros (20 Anos) [Live]: Released: August 25, 2023; Label: BMG; Format: CD, digital download
2025	Ao Vivo No Rio: Released: September 26, 2025; Label: Fresno/Elemess; Format: CD, digital download

=== Extended plays ===
Year	Album details
2001	O Acaso do Erro: Released: 2001; Label: Independent; Format: Digital download
2011	Cemitério das Boas Intenções: Released: 2011; Label: Independent; Format: CD, digital download
2014	Eu Sou a Maré Viva: Released: 2014; Label: Independent; Format: CD, digital download

== Singles ==
Year	Single	Album
2003	"Stonehenge"	Quarto dos Livros
2004	"Onde Está"	O Rio, A Cidade, A Árvore
2006	"Quebre As Correntes"	Ciano
2006	"Alguém Que Te Faz Sorrir"	Ciano
2007	"Pólo"	Redenção
2008	"Uma Música"	Redenção
2008	"Alguém Que Te Faz Sorrir"	Redenção
2009	"Desde Quando Você Se Foi"	Redenção
2009	"Redenção"	Redenção
2010	"Deixa o Tempo"	Revanche

== Video albums ==
Year	Album details
2007	MTV Ao Vivo 5 Bandas de Rock: Released: May 22, 2007; Format: DVD
2009	O Outro Lado da Porta: Released: July 23, 2009; Format: DVD
2015	Fresno 15 Anos Ao Vivo: Released: April 23, 2015; Format: DVD

== Music videos ==
- Stonehenge (2003)
- Onde Está (Where is?) (2004)
- Onde Está (Version 2) (Where Is?) (2005)
- Quebre As Correntes (Break The Chains) (2006)
- Alguém Que Te Faz Sorrir (Someone That Makes You Smile) (2006)
- Polo (2007)
- Uma Música (A Song) (2008)
- Alguém Que Te Faz Sorrir (Redenção Version) (Someone That Makes You Smile) (2008)
- Desde Quando Você Se Foi (Since You've Been Gone) (2009)
- Deixa o Tempo (Let The Time) (2010)
- Eu Sei (I Know) (2010)
- Porto Alegre (2011)
- Sentado à Beira do Caminho (Sitting At The Side Of The Road) (2012)
- Infinito (Infinite) (2012)
- Crocodilia - webclipe (2012)
- Maior Que as Muralhas (Bigger Than The Great Walls) (2013)
- Sutjeska / Farol (Sutjeska/Lighthous) (2013)
- Sobreviver e Acreditar (Surviving and Believing) (2014)
- Acordar (Waking Up) (2015)
- Poeira Estelar (Stardust) (2016)
- O Ar (The Air) (2017)
- Onde Fica A Estrela (Where Is The Star) (2017)
- Convicção (Conviction) (2018)
- Hoje Sou Trovão, parte 2 (ft. Rashid, Caetano Veloso) (Today I Am Thunder, part 2) (2018)
- De Verdade (Real) (2019)
- Cada Acidente (feat. Tuyo) (Each Accident) (2020)
- Isso Não é um Teste (This Is Not A Test) (2020)
- Vou Ter Que Me Virar (I Will Have To Make Do) (2021)
- Já Faz Tanto Tempo (feat. Lulu Santos) (So Long Ago) (2021)
- Eu Nunca Fui Embora (I Have Never Left) (2023)
- Eu Te Amo, Eu Te Odeio (feat. Pabllo Vittar) (I Love You, I Hate You) (2024)
- Me And You (Foda Eu e Você) (Me And You (Fucking Amazing Me And You)) (2024)
- Se Eu For, Eu Vou Com Você (feat. NX Zero) (If I Go, I Will Go With You) (2025)
