= 2010 Multishow Brazilian Music Awards =

17th edition of the Multishow Brazilian Music Awards held in 2010

- Date: 24 August 2010
- Location: HSBC Arena; Rio de Janeiro, Rio de Janeiro, Brazil
- Hosted by: Fernanda Torres; Bruno Mazzeo
- Website: gshow.globo.com/multishow/premio-multishow

Television/radio coverage
- Network: Multishow

The 2010 Multishow Brazilian Music Awards (Portuguese: Prêmio Multishow de Música Brasileira 2010) (or simply 2010 Multishow Awards) (Portuguese: Prêmio Multishow 2010) was held on 24 August 2010, at the HSBC Arena in Rio de Janeiro, Brazil. Fernanda Torres and Bruno Mazzeo hosted the ceremony.

== Winners and nominees ==
Nominees for each award are listed below; winners are listed first and highlighted in boldface.

| Best Male Singer | Best Female Singer |
|---|---|
| **Samuel Rosa**; Caetano Veloso; Di Ferrero; Dinho Ouro Preto; Lucas Silveira | **Ana Carolina**; Claudia Leitte; Ivete Sangalo; Maria Gadú; Pitty |
| New Artist | Best Group |
| **Luan Santana**; Hori; Maria Gadú; Restart; Stevens | **Cine**; NX Zero; Restart; Skank; Titãs |
| Best Sertanejo Artist | Best Instrumentalist |
| **Victor & Leo**; César Menotti & Fabiano; Jorge & Mateus; Luan Santana; Maria Cecília & Rodolfo | **Rodrigo Tavares (Fresno)**; Cadu (Strike); Cesinha (Maria Gadú and Vanessa da Mata); Haroldo Ferretti (Skank); Joe Gomes (Pitty) |
| Best Song | Best Album |
| **"Recomeçar" – Restart**; "Meteoro" – Luan Santana; "Shimbalaiê" – Maria Gadú; "Espero a Minha Vez" – NX Zero; "Me Adora" – Pitty | **Maria Gadú – Maria Gadú**; Hori – Hori; The Rise and Fall of Beeshop – Lucas Silveira; Sete Chaves – NX Zero; Chiaroscuro – Pitty |
| Best DVD | Best Music Video |
| **Chiaroscope – Pitty**; O Outro Lado da Porta – Fresno; Pode Entrar: Multishow Registro – Ivete Sangalo; Ao Vivo – Luan Santana; Ao Vivo e em Cores em São Paulo – Victor & Leo | **"Espero a Minha Vez" – NX Zero**; "A Usurpadora" – Cine; "Segredo" – Hori; "Me Adora" – Pitty; "Noites de um Verão Qualquer" – Skank |
| Best Show | Try It |
| **Ivete Sangalo**; Claudia Leitte; Luan Santana; NX Zero; Victor & Leo | **Móveis Coloniais de Acaju**; Cidadão Instigado; Copacabana Club; Nina Becker; Stop Play Moon |
TVZé
**"As Máscaras" – Tiago Cardoso (Claudia Leitte)**; "A Tendência" – Bruna Knudsen Rodrigues (Strike); "Gosto Tanto" – Douglas Vieira de Sousa (Doug Sousa) (Wanessa Camargo); "Entreolhares" – Henrique Rangel Mello de Sales (Ana Carolina and John Legend); "Na Base do Beijo" – Kadu Gauer (Ivete Sangalo)
