= 2012 MTV Video Music Brazil =

- Date: September 20, 2012
- Location: Espaço das Américas
- Website: http://vmb.mtv.uol.com.br/

Television/radio coverage
- Network: MTV Brasil

The 2012 MTV Video Music Brazil, known as VMB 2012 in Brazil, was held on September 20, 2012, and took place at the Espaço das Américas, São Paulo. It awarded the best in Brazilian music and popular culture in the year of 2012.

With 'street culture' as the awards theme, the VMB 2012 overcame the previous edition as the greatest VMB ever. The event had an audience of 4000 people, and it was four hours long, one hour for the pre-show, two for the main show, and one for after-show, like the previous editions. As the 2011 Video Music Awards, the awards, for the first time, didn't have a host.

For this edition, some concepts of the previous edition was maintained. It was continue to emphasize the alternative scenario of Brazilian music, but, this time, the popular one gained more space. Some popular artists returned to be indicated, like the happy rock band Restart, winner of 5 categories in 2010.

The voting was also reformulated. New categories were created: Best Band, Best Female and Best Male Act. The public has regained emphasis and chose the finalists in each category until September 3. From there, the VMB academy chose the winners. The exceptions were the categories Hit of the Year and International Artist, which were exclusively by popular vote.

== Nominations ==
The nominees were revealed on July 20, 2012. The finalists were revealed on September 3. Nominees with small font weren't selected among the finalists.

=== Artist of the Year ===
- Agridoce
- Emicida
- Gaby Amarantos
- Rita Lee
- Vanguart
- Arnaldo Antunes
- Céu
- Gal Costa
- Mallu Magalhães
- Marisa Monte

=== Video of The Year ===
- ConeCrewDiretoria - "Chama os Mulekes"
- Criolo - "Mariô"
- Edi Rock feat. Seu Jorge - "That's My Way"
- Emicida - "Zica, Vai Lá"
- Fresno - "Infinito"
- Gaby Amarantos - "Xirley"
- Garotas Suecas - "Não Se Perca Por Aí"
- Mallu Magalhães - "Velha e Louca"
- Racionais MC's - "Mil Faces De Um Homem Leal (Marighella)"
- Vanguart - "Mi Vida Eres Tu"
- Junio Barreto - "Passione"
- Lurdez da Luz - "Levante"
- Bonde do Rolê - "Kilo"
- Marisa Monte - "Ainda Bem"
- Marcelo D2 - "Eu Já Sabia"

=== Best Album ===
- Agridoce - "Agridoce"
- BNegão & os Seletores de Frequência - "Sintoniza Lá"
- Cascadura - "Aleluia"
- Vanguart - "Boa Parte de Mim Vai Embora"
- Vivendo do Ócio - "O Pensamento é um Imã"
- Céu - "Caravana Sereia Bloom"
- Gal Costa - "Recanto"
- Karina Buhr - "Longe de Onde"
- Mallu Magalhães - "Pitanga"
- Marisa Monte - "O Que Você Quer Saber de Verdade"

=== Best Song ===
- Emicida - "Dedo na Ferida"
- Rita Lee - "Reza"
- Vanguart - "Mi Vida Eres Tu"
- Vivendo do Ócio - "Nostalgia"
- Wado - "Com a Ponta dos Dedos"
- Bonde do Rolê - "Kilo"
- Karina Buhr - "Cara Palavra"
- Lirinha - "Memória"
- Mallu Magalhães - "Velha e Louca"
- Tulipa Ruiz - "É"

=== Best Band ===
- ConeCrewDiretoria
- Forfun
- Gloria
- Restart
- Vanguart
- Agridoce
- Bonde do Rolê
- Brothers of Brazil
- Cachorro Grande
- Rancore

=== Best Female Act ===
- Gaby Amarantos
- Gal Costa
- Mallu Magalhães
- Maria Gadú
- Rita Lee
- Céu
- Karina Buhr
- Lurdez da Luz
- Marisa Monte
- Tulipa Ruiz

=== Best Male Act ===
- Criolo
- Dinho Ouro Preto
- Emicida
- Lenine
- Projota
- Arnaldo Antunes
- Lirinha
- Lucas Santtana
- Ogi
- Seu Jorge

=== Best New Act ===
- ConeCrewDiretoria
- Projota
- Rancore
- Gaby Amarantos
- Rashid

=== Best Album Art ===
- Agridoce - "Agridoce"
- Autoramas - "Música Crocante"
- Gaby Amarantos - "Treme"
- Vanguart - "Boa Parte de Mim Vai Embora"
- Zeca Baleiro - "O Disco do Ano"
- Bixiga 70 - "Bixiga 70"
- BNegão & Seletores de Frequência - "Sintoniza Lá"
- Curumin - "Arrocha"
- Lucas Santtana - "O Deus que Devasta mas Também Cura"
- Marisa Monte - "O Que Você Quer Saber de Verdade"

=== MTV Bet ===
- RAPadura Xique Chico
- Soulstripper
- O Terno
- Lemoskine
- Selvagens à Procura de Lei
- Cícero
- Clarice Falcão
- Rael da Rima

=== Exclusive categories for popular vote ===
==== Hit of the Year ====
- Agridoce - "Dançando"
- ConeCrewDiretoria - "Chama os Mulekes"
- CW7 - "Tudo Que Eu Sinto"
- Emicida - "Zica, Vai Lá"
- Forfun - "Largo dos Leões"
- O Teatro Mágico - "Nosso Pequeno Castelo"
- Projota - "Desci a Ladeira/Pode se Envolver"
- Rashid - "Quero Ver Segurar"
- Restart - "Menina Estranha"
- Strike - "Fluxo Perfeito"

==== Best International Act ====
- Demi Lovato
- Jay-Z & Kanye West
- Justin Bieber
- Katy Perry
- Lana Del Rey
- Maroon 5
- Nicki Minaj
- One Direction
- Rihanna
- Taylor Swift

== Performances ==
- Planet Hemp (Pre-show Performance) - performed "Dig Dig Dig", "Fazendo a Cabeça", "Legalize Já", "A Culpa é de Quem?" and "Mantenha o Respeito"
- Marcelo D2 (Opening Performance) - performed "Abre Alas"
- Emicida feat. Rashid, Iggor Cavalera, Lúcio Maia e Joe - performed "Dedo na ferida"
- Projota - performed "Desci a Ladeira/Pode se Envolver" / ConeCrewDiretoria - performed "Chama os Mulekes"
- Agridoce - performed "Please Please Please Let Me Get What I Want"
- Karina Buhr - performed "Cara Palavra"
- Bonde do Rolê feat. Karol Konká - performed "Brazilian Boys"
- Gal Costa - performed "Neguinho"
- Racionais MC's (Closing Performance) - performed "Cores e Valores", "Eu Sou 157", "Negro Drama", "Mil Faces de Um Homem Leal (Marighella)", "That's My Way" and "Da Ponte pra Cá" (feat. Dexter, DJ Cia and Helião from RZO, Du Bronk’s and Negreta from Rosana Bronks, and Seu Jorge).

== Appearances ==
- Chuck Hipolitho e Gaía Passarelli - introduced Planet Hemp
- Lucas Stegmann and Deco Neves - introduced Marcelo D2
- Criolo - presented Best New Artist
- Ellen Jabour - introduced Val Marchiori and Dani Calabresa's appearance
- Val Marchiori and Dani Calabresa as Narcisa Tamborindeguy - presented Best Album
- Bob Burnquist - presented Best International Artist
- Didi Effe and Titi Muller - introduced Karina Buhr
- Eduardo Sterblitch as "O Melhor do Melhor do Mundo" (The Best of the Best of the World - a character from "Pânico na Band")
- PC Siqueira and Bento Ribeiro - presented Best Album Art
- Daniela Cicarelli - presented Best Male Artist
- Helio Flanders, from Vanguart, and Emerson Sheik - introduced Projota and ConeCrewDiretoria
- Tatá Werneck as Roxxane (a "Comédia MTV" character) and Paulinho Serra (only voice) - presented MTV Bet
- Negra Li and Lucas Silveira - introduced Agridoce
- Paulinho Serra and Jana Rosa - introduced Bonde do Rolê
- Brothers of Brazil (Supla and João Suplicy) - presented Best Song
- João Lucas & Marcelo and Bruno Sutter as Detonator - presented Hit of The Year
- Arthur Zanetti, Sarah Menezes and Sheila Castro - presented Video of The Year
- Os Gêmeos - introduced Emicida
- Patrícia Abravanel and Mônica Iozzi - presented Best Female Act
- Bnegão e Gaby Amarantos - introduced Gal Costa
- Marcelo Adnet - presented Act of The Year
- Neymar - introduced Racionais MC's
- Emicida - closed the awards
