= Catto (singer) =

Brazilian singer

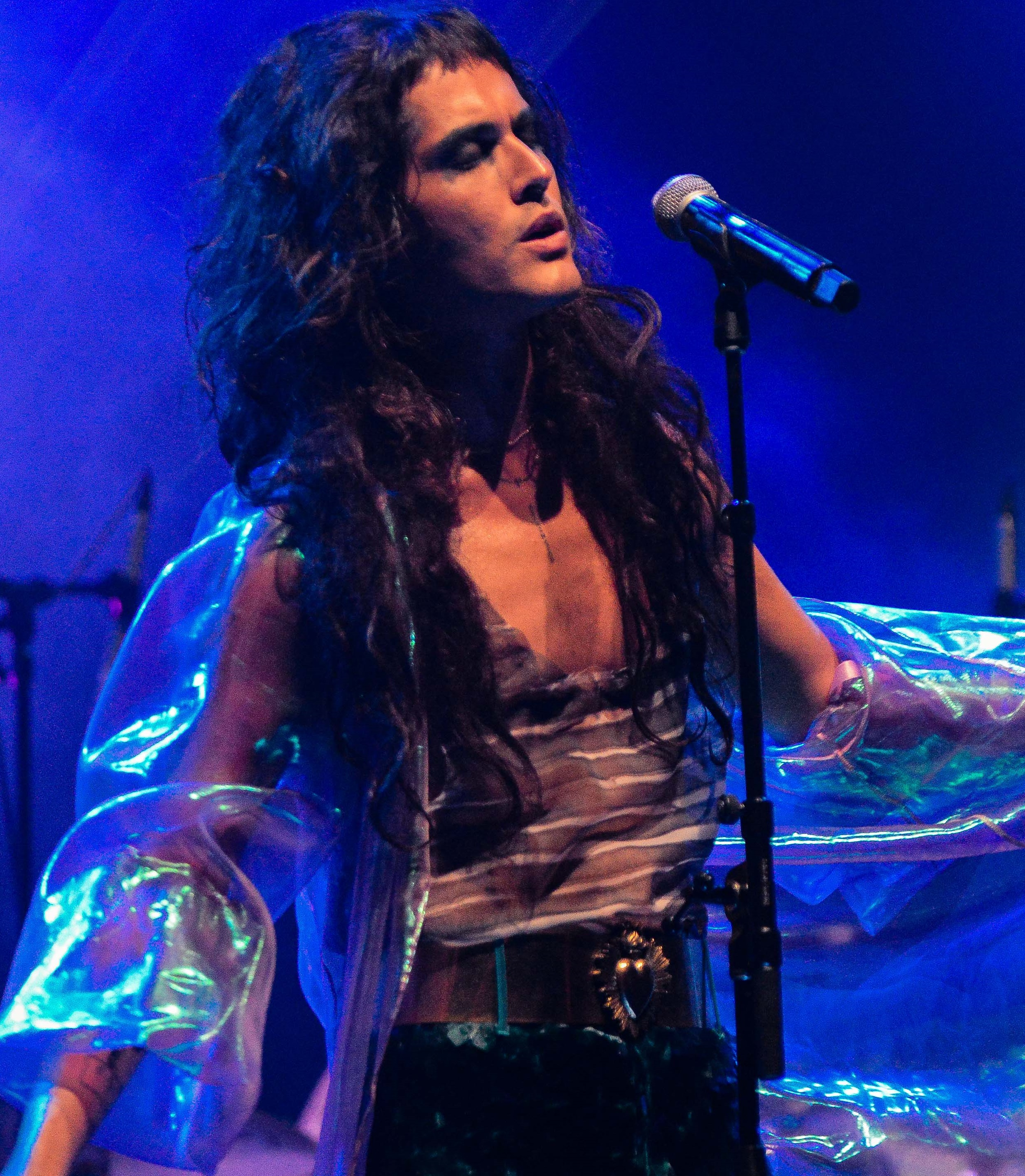
- Catto in 2018

Background information
- Born: Filipe Catto Alves; 26 September 1987 (age 39)
- Origin: Lajeado, Rio Grande do Sul, Brazil
- Genres: MPB, samba
- Occupations: Singer, musician, songwriter
- Instruments: Vocals, acoustic guitar
- Years active: 2006–present
- Labels: Universal Music Group, Radar, Biscoito Fino

Catto Alves (born 26 September 1987), known mononymously as Catto (formerly Filipe Catto), is a Brazilian singer and songwriter. She has worked with genres such as MPB, samba, tango, jazz, rock and bolero. She is non-binary and uses both she/her and they/them pronouns.

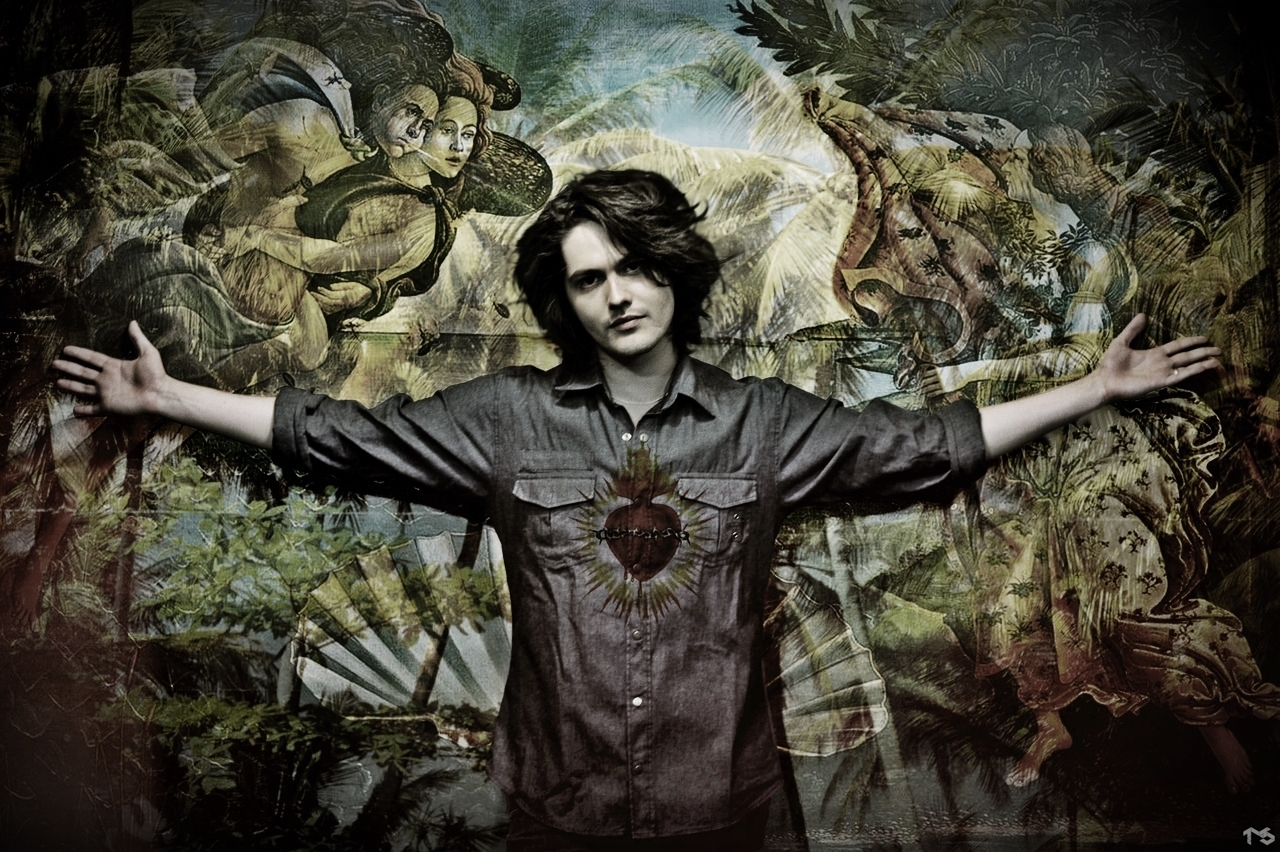
Catto, 2013

She has shared the stage with artists such as Maria Bethânia, Ney Matogrosso, Chico Buarque, Gilberto Gil, Beth Carvalho, Odair José, Marcelo Jeneci, Vanessa da Matta, Toquinho, Daniela Mercury, Zélia Duncan, Maria Gadú, Ana Carolina, Arnaldo Antunes, Nando Reis and Dzi Croquettes.

She frequently sings songs composed by other people, but has also authored songs of her own, both alone and in partnerships with artists such as Zélia Duncan, Tiê, Paulinho Moska and Pedro Luís.

== Early life and first works ==
Born in Lajeado and raised in the state capital Porto Alegre, Catto would sing in parties with her father. As a teenager, she sang in some rock bands. In 2006, she began a solo career performing at bars and released some works on the internet. In 2008, she and director João Pedro Madureira started the show "Ouro e Pétala", involving vocals, acoustic guitar and claps. In 2009, Catto released the Saga EP for free download.

== Career ==
=== 2011-2017: Fôlego and Tomada ===
In 2011, the track "Saga" was featured on the soundtrack for the Cordel Encantado telenovela. Catto signed with Universal Music and recorded her first album: Fôlego. In November 2011 she started the Fôlego Tour at Theatro São Pedro (Porto Alegre).

Catto wrote a Portuguese version of "No Me Compares" ("Não Me Compares"), originally written in Spanish by Alejandro Sanz. Catto's version was recorded by Sanz himself featuring Ivete Sangalo as part of the Salve Jorge telenovela's soundtrack.

In 2013, she released her first live album and DVD, Entre Cabelos, Olhos e Furacões. The release shows took place at the Teatro Sesc Vila Mariana, in São Paulo, on 3 August 2013.

On 8 September 2015, she released her sophomore album Tomada via Agência de Música and Radar Records. The album release show happened on 14 November 2015, at the Auditório Ibirapuera, in São Paulo. Two days before the release of this album, Catto performed with the Minas Gerais Symphony Orchestra and Lyric Choir at the Palácio das Artes in Belo Horizonte, where her own songs were performed with arrangements specially composed for that performance.

Still in 2015, she guest performed on "Trono de Estudar", a song written by Dani Black in support of secondary students who opposed the São Paulo state government's plan to re-structure the state schools. The track featured 17 other artists: Chico Buarque, Arnaldo Antunes (ex-Titãs), Tiê, Dado Villa-Lobos (Legião Urbana), Paulo Miklos (Titãs), Tiago Iorc, Lucas Silveira (Fresno), Zélia Duncan, Pedro Luís (Pedro Luís & A Parede), Fernando Anitelli (O Teatro Mágico), André Whoong, Lucas Santtana, Miranda Kassin, Tetê Espíndola, Helio Flanders (Vanguart), Felipe Roseno and Xuxa Levy.

In 2016, she was featured at the second episode of Versões, a Canal Bis program, in which she sang hits by Cássia Eller, such as "Gatas Extraordinárias", "Malandragem", "Relicário", "O Segundo Sol", among others. The show became a tour that took him to several cities including São Paulo, where she performed at the 2017 Virada Cultural, in which she called for direct elections following the impeachment of Dilma Rousseff.

Also in 2017, she toured with Simone Mazzer for the Prêmio da Música Brasileira, with Gonzaguinha tribute shows.

In 2017, she began the "Over" tour, having only acoustic guitarists Pedro Sá and Luís Felipe de Lima as supporting musicians. Catto performed songs from her previous albums and also songs by Portishead, Marília Mendonça and Vinicius de Moraes.

Still in 2017, she performed in a series of shows with artists such as Maria Bethânia, Vanessa da Matta, Johnny Hooker, Xênia França and Mestrinho. She paid a tribute to Vinicius de Moraes at Espaço das Américas besides Toquinho and Daniela Mercury, and to Dalva de Oliveira's centennial at Teatro J Safra in São Paulo, besides singers such as Angela Maria, Alaíde Costa, As Bahia e a Cozinha Mineira, Ayrton Montarroyos, Célia, Cida Moreira, Claudette Soares, Edy Star, Fafá de Belém, Marina de La Riva, Maria Alcina, Márcio Gomes, Tetê Espíndola, Veronica Ferriani and Virgínia Rosa. She also performed a solo tribute to Cauby Peixoto at Bar Brahma; Peixoto once cited Catto as one of his favorite new singers.

=== 2017-present: CATTO and other projects ===
On 24 November 2017, she released her third studio album CATTO.

Critic Hagamenon Brito, from Correio da Bahia, said CATTO is Catto's best album and that she is the best singer of her generation. "It was the discovery of my silence, of what was essential following the end of a seven-year marriage, of moving out, of my arrival to the 30's. Professionally, I didn't need a new album but everything flowed cinematographically to this", she said in an interview to the critic.

Her "O Nascimento de Vênus Tour" was premiered in Portugal and at Sesc Vila Mariana in São Paulo in early 2018.

In March, she took the tour to the United States, with three shows at SxSW festivalin Austin, Texas. The festival's website described Catto as "one of the great Brazilian voices from the 21st century, like a diva and something between Freddie Mercury and Maria Bethânia, between bolero and modern glam rock".

On 28 May, the video for "Manifestação" was released, featuring 30 artists celebrating the 70th anniversary of the Universal Declaration of Human Rights.

On 27 July, she took the "O Nascimento de Vênus Tour" to the Garanhuns Winter Festival (FIG 2018), performing at the main stage alongside Gaby Amarantos and Johnny Hooker. On the following day, she performed at the Lula Livre Festival, at the Arcos da Lapa in Rio de Janeiro, besides artists such as Chico Buarque, Gilberto Gil, Beth Carvalho, Odair José, Marcelo Jeneci, Aíla, Gang 90 and other who believed former president Lula da Silva should be released from prison following corruption accusations.

Since the beginning of the COVID-19 pandemic, she presents the karaoke program Love Catto Live.

Her album Belezas São Coisas Acesas por Dentro was chosen by the Associação Paulista de Críticos de Arte as one of the 50 best Brazilian albums of 2023.

== Discography ==
- 2009 - Saga (EP)
- 2011 - Fôlego
- 2013 - Entre Cabelos, Olhos e Furacões (live)
- 2015 - Tomada
- 2017 - CATTO

=== Singles ===
- "Adoração" (2011)
- "Flor da Idade" (2013)
- "Eu Te Amo (And I Love Her)" (2013)
- "Dias e Noites" (2015)
- "Paloma Negra" (2016)
- "Eu Não Quero Mais" (2017)
- "Canção de Engate" (2017)

=== Soundtrack appearances ===
- "Saga" in Cordel Encantado (2011)
- "Quem É Você" Sangue Bom (2013)
- "Adoração" Saramandaia (2013)
- "Flor da Idade" Joia Rara (2013)
- "Redoma" in the film Linda, uma História Horrível (2014)
- "Teu Quarto" in the webseries Rosa (2018)

== Videography ==
=== Videos ===
- "Dias e Noites" - dir. Fernanda Rotta e Rodrigo Pesavento (2015)
- "Do Fundo do Coração" - feat. Dzi Croquettes - dir. Marcos Mello Cavallaria e Ciro Barcellos (2017)
- "Lua Deserta" - dir. Marcos Mello Cavallaria (2017)
- "Canção de Engate" - dir. Joana Linda (2018)
- "É Sempre o Mesmo Lugar" - dir. Daguito Rodrigues (2019)
- "Eu Não Quero Mais" - dir. Ismael Caneppele (2019)
- "Um Nota Um" - dir. Couple of Things (2019)
- "Faz Parar" - dir. Romy Pocztaruk e Livia Pasqual (2019)

=== DVDs ===
- "Entre Cabelos, Olhos e Furacões (live)" - dir. Willand Pinsdorf (2013)

=== Video-album ===
- CATTO + MÉLIÈS - dir. Daguito Rodrigues e Catto (2018)

== Tours ==
- "Saga" (2009–2011)
- "Fôlego" (2011–2013)
- "Entre Cabelos, Olhos e Furacões" (2013–2015)
- "Coração Intransitivo", with Célia and Márcia Castro (2015)
- "Tomada" (2015–2017)
- "Catto Canta Cássia" (2015–2017)
- "Catto & Simone Mazzer" (2016)
- "Over" (2017)
- "O Nascimento de Vênus Tour" (2018–2020)
- "Vênus Unplugged - Voz&Violão" (2019–2020)
- "Persona: Catto & Johnny Hooker" (2019–2020)

== Awards and nominations ==
=== Brazilian Music Awards ===
Year	Category	Nominated	Result
2012	Best MPB Singer	Catto	Nominated
2012	Best New Artist	Catto	Nominated

=== Prêmio Contigo! MPB FM ===
Year	Category	Nomination	Result
2012	Artist "Faro" of the Year	Catto	Won
2012	Best singer	Catto	Nominated

=== Troféu APCA ===
Year	Category	Nomination	Result
2015	Artist of the Year	Catto	Nominated

=== Prêmio Açorianos ===
Year	Category	Nomination	Result
2009	Best New Artist	Catto	Won
2011	Best MPB performer	Catto	Won
2011	Best MPB Album	Fôlego	Won
2011	Best MPB Composer	Catto	Nominated
2011	Best Graphic Project	Catto e Geysa Adnet (por Fôlego)	Nominated

=== Festival Internacional de Cinema de Gramado ===
Year	Category	Nomination	Result
2014	Best Song: "Redoma"	Catto	Won

=== Others ===
- 2011 - Best Song ("Adoração") - 10th place - Best 2011 songs - Rolling Stone Brasil
- 2011 - Best of the Year- UOL Música
- 2012 - Best Brazilian Singers of the Past 10 Years – Blog Mais Cultura Brasileira
- 2014 - Best Song ("Redoma") - Mostra Gaúcha of the 42º Festival de Cinema de Gramado, for the film Linda, uma História Horrível
- 2015 - Best Singer - Revista Quem
- 2015 - Best Albums of 2015 (Tomada) - Música Inspira
- 2015 - Best Albums of 2015 (Tomada) - Move That Jukebox
- 2016 - Best Singer - Revista Feminino e Além
- 2016 - Best Show (Turnê "Tomada") - 2nd place - Festival Vento
- 2017 - Top5 Virals in Brazil from Spotify (Single "Eu Não Quero Mais")
- 2017 - Best Alternative Singer - Prêmio Radiola 2017
- 2017 - Melhor Disco do Ano (CATTO) - Popland/Correio da Bahia
- 2017 - Melhor Disco do Ano (CATTO) - Central da MPB
- 2017 - Best Albums of the Year (CATTO) - Napster
- 2017 - Best Albums of the Year (CATTO) - Capuccino Pop
- 2017 - Best Albums of the Year (CATTO) - 505 Indie
- 2017 - Best Albums of the Year (CATTO) - Embrulhador
- 2017 - Best Albums of the Year (CATTO) - Página Dois
- 2017 - Best Albums of the Year (CATTO) - Audiograma
- 2017 - Best Albums of the Year (CATTO) - Scream&Yell
- 2017 - Best Videos of the Year ("Lua Deserta")
- 2017 - Best Covers Arts of the Year (CATTO)
- 2017 - Best Singles of the Year ("Eu Não Quero Mais")
- 2017 - Best Songs of the Year ("Faz Parar")
- 2017 - 20 Best Singles of the Year ("Lua Deserta" and "Do Fundo do Coração")
- 2017 - 50 Best Songs of the Year ("Eu Não Quero Mais")
- 2017 - 100 Best Songs of the Year ("Torrente") - Timbre
- 2017 - 100 Best Songs of the Year ("Canção de Engate") - Embrulhador
- 2018 - Best Videos of the Year ("Canção de Engate") - Pipoca Moderna
- 2018 - 50 Best Videos of the Year ("Canção de Engate") - MultimodoBR
- Best Videos of 2019 ("Eu Não Quero Mais") - Hits Perdidos
