= Revanche =

Revanche may refer to:

- Revanchism, a political concept
- Revanche (film), a 2008 Austrian thriller film
- Kwannon (character), a comic book superhero also known as Revanche
- Revanche (album), 2010 album by Fresno
- French ship Revanche, two ships of the French navy

== See also ==
- Revenge (disambiguation)
