= SWU Music & Arts =

Brazilian music festival

- Genre: Rock, Brazilian music, world, electronic, Pop music
- Dates: October 9–11, 2010. November 12–14, 2011.
- Locations: Itu, São Paulo, Brazil
- Years active: 2010–2011
- Website: swu.com.br/en/festival/

SWU (Starts With You, or "Começa Com Você" - CCV, in Portuguese) is originally a Brazilian sustainability movement, which organised the rock music festival SWU Music & Arts Festival. The festival had its first edition in October 2010. It was a three-day-long festival that had many important national and international musical acts including Megadeth, Avenged Sevenfold, Linkin Park, Kings of Leon, Queens of the Stone Age and Rage Against the Machine. It took place in the Arena Maeda in Itu on October 9, 10 and 11, 2010. Arena Maeda is actually a farm, which hosts many events because of its good terrain and location. The event also had most of its main concerts recorded and broadcast live on international television.

The second edition took place in Paulínia on November 12, 13 and 14, 2011. The festival has not been held since.

== SWU Music & Arts Festival 2010 ==
The concerts took place in four different stages: Ar (air), Água (water), Heineken Greenspace and Oi Novo Som (Oi New Sound). Act names in Bold are Headliners.

=== Line-up ===
Saturday 9 October	Sunday 10 October	Monday 11 October
Palco Ar (Air Stage)
**Rage Against the Machine**; Los Hermanos; Infectious Grooves; Black Drawing Chalks	**Dave Matthews Band**; Regina Spektor; Capital Inicial; O Teatro Mágico	**Linkin Park**; Queens of the Stone Age; Avenged Sevenfold; Yo La Tengo; Crashdïet; Alain Johannes
Palco Água (Water Stage)
**The Mars Volta**; Os Mutantes; Macaco Bong; Brothers of Brazil	**Kings of Leon**; Joss Stone; Sublime with Rome; Jota Quest	**Pixies**; Incubus; Cavalera Conspiracy; Rahzel; Glória; Ilo Ferreira; Tiësto^{1}
Heineken Greenspace
**The Crystal Method**; MSTRKRFT; Switch; The Twelves; Killer on the Dancefloor; Glocal; Steve Angello^{1}; DJ Marky^{1}	**Markus Schulz**; Sharam; Roger Sanchez; Sander Kleinenberg; Life Is a Loop; Nick Warren; Mario Fischetti	**Erol Alkan**; Gui Boratto; Mixhell; Aeroplane; Anthony Rother; Anderson Noise
Palco Oi Novo Som (Oi New Sound Stage)^{2}
**The Apples in Stereo**; Cidadão Instigado; Mallu Magalhães; Curumin & The Aipins; Superguidis; Letuce + qinhO; Sobrado 112	**Bomba Estéreo**; Otto; Tulipa Ruiz; Lucas Santtana; Luísa Maita; Rubinho e Força Bruta; Volver	**CSS**; Josh Rouse; BNegão & Seletores de Frequência; Autoramas; Mombojó; Fino Coletivo; Tono

^{1}Late night performances after the headliners by various DJ's.
^{2}Every night one independent band winner of the "Battle of Bands Oi Novo Som Contest" performed after the headliners.

== SWU Music & Arts Festival 2011 ==
Less than two days after the end of the 2010 edition, it was posted in the festival's official Facebook page that there would be a 2011 version of the festival. There is an official page of the festival's website in its Brazilian version, where it is asked for opinions and suggestion for the 2011 festival. On 3 June 2011, it was confirmed by the Brazilian edition of the Portuguese broadsheet newspaper Destak that the festival will be held at a new venue. While organizers have yet to finalize details, it was speculated that the event may be held at the São Paulo municipality of Paulínia.

Line-up and Stages
	Energia (Energy)	Consciência (Consciousness)	New Stage	Heineken Greenspace
Dia 12	Michael Franti & Spearhead; Marcelo D2; Snoop Dogg; Black Eyed Peas	Emicida; SOJA; Damian Marley; Kanye West	Copacabana Club; Miranda Kassin & Andre Frateschi; Matt & Kim; OFWGKTA; Ghostland Observatory	Guest DJ; DATABASE; Ask to Quit; AVICII; DJ Marky & S. P. Y present Galaxy; Who Made Who; James Murphy; Frankie Knuckles; Tiga
Dia 13	Zé Ramalho; Tedeschi Trucks Band; Duran Duran; Lynyrd Skynyrd	Ultraje a Rigor; Chris Cornell; Peter Gabriel & The New Blood Orchestra	Apolonio; Sabonetes; Is Tropical; !!!; Playing For Change; Modest Mouse; Hole	Guest DJ; Raul Boesel; Meme; Gareth Emery; Paulo Boghosian; Booka Shade; John Digwee; Afrojack; Fedde Le Grand
Dia 14	Raimundos; Black Rebel Motorcycle Club; 311; Primus; Stone Temple Pilots; Faith No More	Duff McKagan’s Loaded; Down; Sonic Youth; Megadeth; Alice in Chains	Medulla; Ash; Pepper; The Black Angel; Bag Raiders; Miyavi; Crystal Castles; Simple Plan	Guest DJ; Dubshape; M.A.N.D.Y; Joris Voorn e Nic Fanciulli.; Gui Boratto; Layo & Bushwacka; Loco Dice; Sven Väth
