= ØRGIA =

- Photo by Carlos Salles

Studio album by Johnny Hooker
- Released: 9 June 2022
- Genre: Pop, samba, electronic music, brega
- Length: 44:16
- Label: Independent
- Producer: Arthur Marques, DJ Thai, Felipe Puperi, João Inácio da Silva, Barro, Guilherme Assis, Tiago Bizani Abrahão

Johnny Hooker chronology
Coração (2017)	ØRGIA (2022)

Singles from ØRGIA
- 1. "Amante de Aluguel" Released: 20 October 2021; 2. "Larga Esse Boy" Released: 16 December 2021; 3. "Cuba" Released: 21 May 2022

ØRGIA is the third album by Brazilian singer-songwriter Johnny Hooker, released on 9 June 2022 independently. It was succeeded by a European tour which included a performance at Rock in Rio Lisboa IX. It was originally expected for the second semester of 2021, a date which was specified to November as the moment approached. Around that time, Hooker said he wouldn't release any videos because he wasn't willing to gather professionals amidst the quarantine imposed by the COVID-19 pandemic.

The day after he released the third single "Cuba", which clip was recorded in the Greater Recife area (more specifically in Ilha de Itamaracá) with a local team, Hooker suggested in a social media post that we would quit the music business due to both the poor immediate commercial performance of the song and the post-pandemic music scene in Brazil, which he saw as dominated by sertanejo.

The album's visual concept is signed by Filipe Catto, Carlos Salles and Alma Negrot.

== Themes ==
The album spent four years in the making and is based on the book Orgia - Diários de Tulio Carella, written by Argentinian poet Tulio Carella during his times in Recife in the 1960s. The singer compares Carella's sexual experiences in the city before being arrested and deported back to his country right before its dictatorship began; with his own journey of moving to São Paulo and delighting himself with "the possibilities of desire that it offers" albeit feeling that "the cloud of authoritarianism, fascism and militarism was also approaching". He also compared Recife at that time with its current form, describing both instances as "conservative and religious, but also culturally rich". during the album recordings, Hooker also carried around a copy of Devassos no Paraíso: A Homossexualidade no Brasil da Colônia à Atualidade, by João Silvério Trevisan.

Hooker consider the album the third part of a trilogy, claiming that the first album, Eu Vou Fazer Uma Macumba Pra Te Amarrar, Maldito!, speaks about "love"; the second one, Coração, is "a musical celebration"; and the third album "ends with desire". In another moment, he described the trilogy as follows: "The first album elaborates on romantic love. The second one speaks of love in a more political, combative sense [...]. Love, you being with someone, you confronting the whole world with someone, you living this love, all relationships are political. The third one is more like the conclusion of that. When everything crumbles, when the country dies, what's left for us? Our bodies. Our pleasure. Our art. Our individual liberty. I dive into this sense: sex is also a weapon of resistance. Desire is also a political power."

== Song information ==
The opening song (not counting the introduction "Cap 1 A Cidade do Desejo"), "Amante de Aluguel", was released as the first single and speaks about "a prostitute which gets romantically involved with a man full of prejudices and shackles of society. However, the characters bond so much that the man decides to set himself free and let his feminine side flourish. It was easy for him, since he even suffered physical violence as a consequence. In the end, that was the bond that allowed love to flourish."

The second single, "Larga Esse Boy", features Jáder and received a video inspired by "Telephone” (Lady Gaga feat. Beyoncé), "Cool" (Gwen Stefani) and "Don’t Tell Me" (Madonna).

"Nos Braços de um Estranho" features backing vocals by his mother and sister, with whom he briefly lived in Florianópolis during part of the pandemic. "NSRA da Encruzilhada" and "Maré", although not penned by Hooker, were written exclusively for the album. The latter features Silva.

The second to last track features part of a speech by Marielle Franco in which she says that she "will not be silenced". The closing song, "Vuelve", is a Spanish version of "Volta", from his debut album, and simbolizes Carella's return to Argentina.

== Track listing ==
All tracks are written by Johnny Hooker, except where specified.

ØRGIA tracks
No.	Title	Writer(s)	Length
1.	"Cap 1 A Cidade do Desejo" (Chap 1 The City of Desire (section of the book Orgia - Diários de Tulio Carella, by Tulio Carella)		01:54
2.	"Amante de Aluguel" (Rent-a-Lover)	Johnny Hooker, Erica Colaço, DJ Thai, Arthur Marques	03:16
3.	"Nhac!" (feat. Chameleo)	Chameleo, Amanda Coronha, Bibi, Deco Martins	03:32
4.	"Nos Braços De Um Estranho" (In the Arms of a Stranger)		02:45
5.	"Só Pra Ser Teu Homem" (Just to Be Your Man)		03:34
6.	"CUBA"	Marques, Thai	02:49
7.	"Maré" (Tide; feat. Silva)	Juliano Holanda	03:25
8.	"Larga Esse Boy" (Dump This Boy; feat Jáder)		03:17
9.	"NSRA da Encruzilhada" (Our Lady of The Crossing)	Filipe Catto	03:50
10.	"Abrigo" (Shelter)		04:33
11.	"Eu Te Desafio a Me Amar" (I Dare You to Love Me)		04:06
12.	"Estandarte" (Standard (as in flag))		03:13
13.	"Vuelve" (Come Back)		04:02
Total length:			44:16
