= Infinito =

Infinito may refer to:

- Infinito (Fresno album), a 2012 album
- Infinito (Cyro Baptista album), a 2009 album
- Infinito (Litfiba album), a 1999 album
- "Infinito", a 2025 song by Napa
