= Ciano =

Ciano may refer to:

- Ciano (surname), a surname of Italian origin
- Ciano (Crocetta del Montello), a hamlet (frazione) of Crocetta del Montello, Veneto
- Ciano d'Enza, a hamlet (frazione) of Canossa, Emilia-Romagna
- Ciano (album), album of rock band Brazilian Fresno
