= Gaby Amarantos =

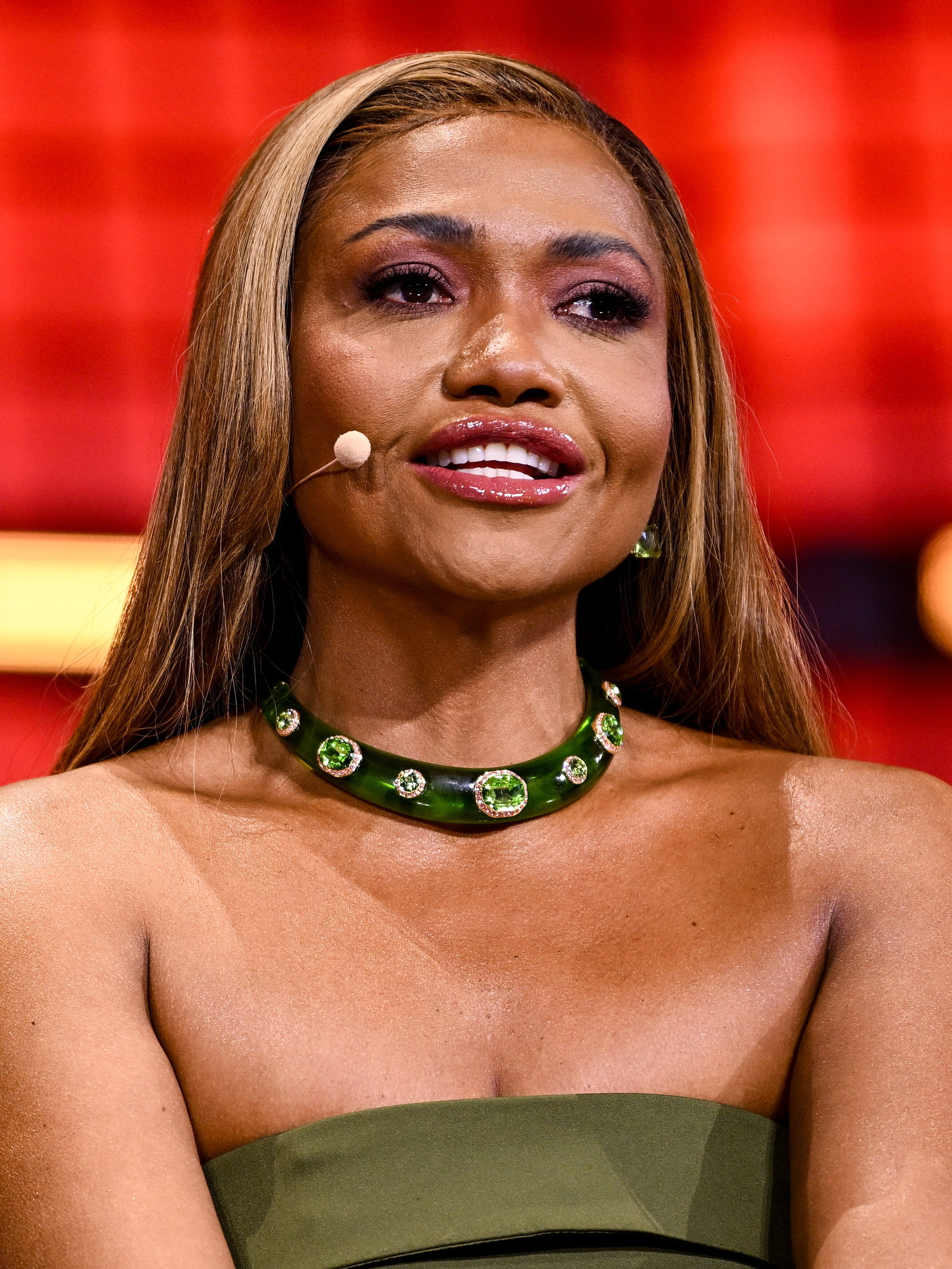
- Amarantos in 2025

Background information
- Also known as: Gaby Amarantos
- Born: Gabriela Amaral dos Santos; 1 August 1978 (age 48); Belém, Pará, Brazil
- Genres: Tecno brega, Latin pop, MPB
- Occupation: Singer
- Instrument: Vocals
- Years active: 1995–present
- Website: http://www.gabyamarantos.com/

Gabriela Amaral dos Santos (born 1 August 1978), known professionally as Gaby Amarantos, is a Brazilian singer from the city of Belém.

== Biography ==
Amarantos was born in the low-income neighborhood of Jurunas in Belém, in the state of Pará, Brazil. She is of mixed indigenous Amazonian and Afro-Brazilian descent. She began singing in the local church of Santa Teresinha do Menino Jesus, and at the age of 15 began to perform on the local bar scene.

Born into a family of samba enthusiasts, Amarantos was also influenced at an early age by the Caribbean radio frequencies that reached equatorial Belém, along with brega, lambada, Clara Nunes, Kraftwerk, and Juan Luis Guerra. Later, the electronic aparelhagem soundsystem parties in Jurunas would have a strong impact on her musical direction.

In 2002, she rose to fame in Pará state as the emerging star of the tecno brega scene fronting Banda Tecno Show and performing Portuguese covers of Cyndi Lauper and Roxette.

In 2011, she achieved national success with a version of "Single Ladies", gaining the nickname "Amazonian Beyonce", followed by the 2012 hit single and soundtrack for the telenovela Cheias de Charme, "Ex Mai Love".

== Discography ==
=== Studio albums ===
Title	Year	Record label	Media
Treme	2012	Som Livre	CD
Purakê	2021	Amarantos Eleva	CD

=== Singles ===
Single	Year	Record label	Media
"Xirley"	2011	Som Livre	Digital Download
"Ex Mai Love"	2012	Som Livre	Digital Download
"Chuva"	2013	Som Livre	Digital Download

== Awards and nominations ==
Year	Award	Category	Recipients and nominees	Outcome
2012	Prêmio Multishow	New Hit	"Ex Mai Love"	Won
2012	MTV Video Music Brazil	Best Album Art	Treme	Won
2012	MTV Video Music Brazil	Music Video of the Year	"Xirley"	Nominated
2012	MTV Video Music Brazil	Best Female Act	Gaby Amarantos	Won
2012	MTV Video Music Brazil	Artist of the Year	Gaby Amarantos	Won
2012	Latin Grammy Awards	Best New Artist	Gaby Amarantos	Nominated
2012	Latin Grammy Awards	Best Brazilian Roots Album	Treme	Nominated
2019	MTV Millennial Awards	Best 'Feat'	"Corpo Fechado" (with Johnny Hooker)	Won
2020	MVF Awards	Best Costume Design	"Vênus Em Escorpião"	Won
