= Jurunas =

Neighborhood of the City of Belém, Brazil

- Neighborhood
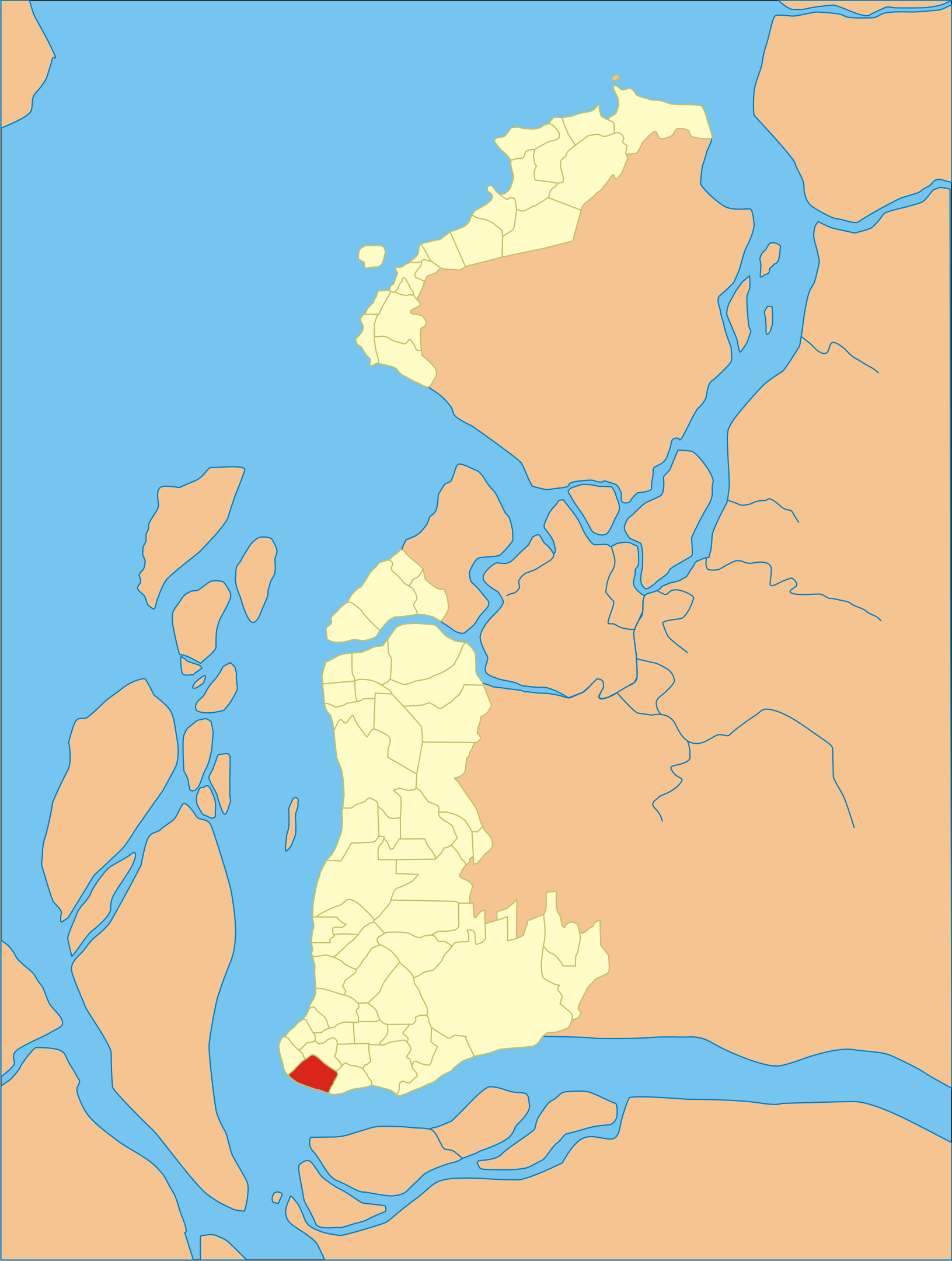
- Neighborhood of Jurunas within the Municipality of Belém
- Country: Brazil
- State: Pará
- Municipality: Belém
- Settled: Early 1600s
- Named after: Jurunas indigenous people

Population (2010)
  - Total: 64,478

Jurunas is a neighborhood of the Brazilian city of Belém, as of 2010, it has a population of 64,478, up from 62,740 in 2000, its name is derived from the indigenous tribe of the Jurunas (see Yudjá).

It is one of the most populous neighborhoods of the city of Belém, with a population composed of indigenous ethnicities, Ribeirinhos, middle-class families from the 17th and 18th centuries, and the poor working-class.

The neighborhood is very close to the center of the city, with extensive connections through avenues and roads, however due to its geographical location it is not an obligatory path in the daily commute of the population of other neighborhoods of Belém or Ananindeua, with the exception of other contiguous and peripheric neighborhoods (Condor, Cremação, Guamá).

== History ==
Previous to Portuguese colonization, the region of Jurunas, marked by the Igarapé do Piry was inhabited by various traditional ethnicities, some of whom died off during the Portuguese conquest. The remaining indigenous people were involved in the process of Miscegenation, as the area was slowly occupied by the colonists.

Similarly to the neighborhoods of Guamá and Condor, Jurunas began its foundations on the shores of the Guamá River, with initial occupation dating to the 17th century, though it was only in the 18th century that the region was incorporated into the larger urban area of Belém, through the opening of roads that however poorly, connected the urban center to the lands that were being used as residence or for low-income economic activity of the local populations.

In the early 19th century, the Igarapé do Piry, a branch of the Guamá River, was filled, allowing for the urban center to expand into the modern-day neighborhoods of Batista Campos, Jurunas, Condor, Cremação e Guamá. From this point on, new avenues and streets were built, most notably the road of São José, starting on the docks of Ver-o-Peso and going in a straight line all the way to the Largo de São José, which, once bypassed, would reach the neighborhood of Jurunas. Thorough the 1800s the area slowly gained new streets and avenues, and the neighborhood gradually increased in value, noticeable for the increasing amount of sale announcements in local newspapers.

Between the end of the 19th century and the start of the 20th century, the interest of local politicians and administrators led to an increasing investment in improving the economic, hygienic and living conditions of the city, which affected the neighborhood through improvement of sanitations, deforestation, and construction of bridges.

At the beginning of the 20th century, despite poorer conditions and its relative geographical isolation, the neighborhood received more and more inhabitants, with richer citizens building small estates (rocinhas) for themselves, and the local working-class population took increasing more part in the commercial, religious and cultural life of the city.

Between 1950 and 1980, the neighborhood saw extensive levels of migration, with half of all migrants arriving in this period, migrants came specially from Ribeirinho populations of the surrounding regions of Northeastern Pará, the Marajó Archipelago, and Lower and Medium Amazonas.

== Notable people ==
- Gaby Amarantos - singer
