= Ciano (surname) =

Ciano is a surname of Italian origin. People with that name include:

- Camillo Ciano (born 1990), Italian footballer
- Costanzo Ciano (1876–1939), Italian naval commander and politician, father of Galeazzo
- Galeazzo Ciano (1903–1944), Italian foreign minister, son-in-law of Mussolini

== See also ==
- Ciano (disambiguation)
