= Shimbalaiê =

Single by Maria Gadú

from the album Maria Gadú
- Released: 25 August 2009
- Genre: MPB
- Length: 3:17
- Label: Som Livre
- Songwriter: Maria Gadú

"Shimbalaiê" is a song by Brazilian singer-songwriter Maria Gadú from her self-titled album Maria Gadú (released on 20 July 2009). The song was also included on the soundtrack of the soap opera Viver a Vida. It was released as a single on 25 August 2009. It was a commercial success in Brazil the same year and, later, even more so in Italy.

== History ==
"Shimbalaiê" was Gadú's first musical composition and the singer claims that she wrote and composed it when she was 10 years old. According to her, the song came to her at sunset on a beach when she was all alone, without even her guitar. Gadú admits that "Shimbalaiê" came to her as a shock, given that she didn't enjoy writing music very much. She didn't return to composing for another nine years. "I was simply describing a landscape", she said. The singer confirmed that the word shimbalaiê doesn't have any real meaning. "Children love to invent words, right?", Gadú explained in an interview in 2010.

== Style ==
The song contains pieces of the maracatu rhythm from Northeastern Brazil.

== Music videos ==
The original music video was filmed in 2011 in Bogliasco, Italy. Gadú does not appear in it. Later, in 2014, another music video was released in which Gadú does appear.

== Chart performance ==
From 4 August to 1 September 2011, the song was number one in the Italian FIMI and the iTunes Store charts, surpassing well-known artists like Adele, Katy Perry, Maroon 5 and Pitbull. The song also went platinum, which marked the first time that a Brazilian artist had achieved such a distinction in Italy.

=== Weekly charts ===
Chart (2011)	Peak position
Italy (FIMI)	1
Italy Airplay (EarOne)	1

=== Year-end charts ===
Chart (2011)	Position
Italy (FIMI)	11
Italy Airplay (EarOne)	23
