= Alguém Que Te Faz Sorrir =

Single by Fresno

from the album Ciano
- Released: December 1, 2006
- Recorded: 2006
- Genre: Emo
- Length: 3:21
- Label: Terapia Records
- Songwriter(s): Lucas Silveira

Fresno singles chronology
"Quebre As Correntes" (2006)	"Alguém Que Te Faz Sorrir" (2006)	"Pólo" (2008)

Alguém Que Te Faz Sorrir (English: Someone Who Makes You Smile) is a song by Brazilian emo band Fresno. Written by Lucas Silveira, the track was released for his third album Ciano.

"Alguém Que Te Faz Sorrir" was released on December 1, 2006 as the second single from the album Ciano. The single was not released to radio, but the Internet has a video for the song.

== Music video ==
The first official recording of a hit has taken a little strong, the music video is set in a flower shop and has a band perform. This is the first clip after the departure of bassist Lezo and input and participation of the then new member Rodrigo Tavares.

=== Alguém Que Te Faz Sorrir (Redenção Version) ===
"Alguém Que Te Faz Sorrir"

Single by Fresno

from the album Redenção
- Released: December 11, 2008
- Recorded: 2008
- Genre: Emo
- Length: 3:17
- Label: Universal Music, Arsenal Music
- Songwriter(s): Lucas Silveira

Fresno singles chronology
"Uma Música" (2008)	"Alguém Que Te Faz Sorrir" (2008)	"Desde Quando Você Se Foi" (2009)

Alguém Que Te Faz Sorrir (English: Someone Who Makes You Smile) is a song by Brazilian Rock band Fresno. Written by Lucas Silveira, the track was re-release for his fourth album Redenção.

"Alguém Que Te Faz Sorrir" was re-released on December 11, 2008 as the third single from the album Redenção. The single was released to radio.

== Music video ==
It was recorded on 01/12/2008 in São Paulo, the third single from the album Redenção. The hit that had been recorded on the album "Ciano" now won a version of pop and a new music video made on the 25th anniversary of singer Lucas Silveira. The footage was shot in a house in the neighborhood of Pacaembu, and enjoying the relaxed atmosphere and story of the clip, they played as a party and even with the participation of members of bands such as Glória, Leela, Sugar Kane and other friends of the band. The video tells the story of betrayal between brothers and the participation of actress Monique Alfradique. The days 11/12/2008 debuted in the Domínio MTV and became first in the charts of radio stations throughout Brazil.

== Sales and certifications ==
Country	Providers	Certification (threshold)	Sales or shipments
Brazil	ABPD	Gold	50,000
