= O Outro Lado da Porta =

Video by Fresno
- Released: July 23, 2009
- Recorded: March 11, 2009
- Studio: Midas, São Paulo
- Genre: Rock
- Length: 106 mins
- Language: Portuguese
- Label: Arsenal/Universal
- Producer: Rick Bonadio

Fresno DVDs chronology
O Outro Lado da Porta (2009)	Fresno 15 Anos ao Vivo (2015)

O Outro Lado da Porta (Portuguese for The Other Side of the Door) is the first DVD by Brazilian emo band Fresno, released on July 23, 2009. The DVD was recorded on March 11, 2009 at studio Midas in São Paulo.

== Track listing ==
1. Redenção
2. Passado
3. Quebre as Correntes
4. Pólo
5. Duas Lágrimas
6. Uma Música
7. Desde Quando Você Se Foi
8. Alguém Que Te Faz Sorrir
9. O Gelo
10. Onde Está
11. Stonehenge
12. Impossibilidades
13. Absolutamente Nada
14. Europa
15. Milonga
