= O Rio, A Cidade, A Árvore =

Studio album by Fresno
- Released: 2004
- Recorded: 2004
- Genres: Melodic hardcore; Pop-Punk
- Label: RCT/Antídoto

Fresno chronology
Quarto dos Livros (2003)	O Rio, A Cidade, A Árvore (2004)	Ciano (2005)

Singles from O Rio, A Cidade, A Árovre
- 1. "Onde Está" Released: May 19, 2005

O Rio, A Cidade, A Árvore (English: The River, The City, The Tree) is the second album from the Brazilian rock band Fresno, released in 2004, through the RCT and Antídoto.

The album was released with one single and received favorable reviews.

== Release and promotion ==
=== Tour ===
Fresno began to support his album on 11 February 2005 in São Paulo and ended on 29 December 2005 in Rio Grande do Sul.

=== Singles ===
- "Onde Está" not been released to radio but told Brazilian with a music video for the song.

== Track listing ==
No.	Title	Writer(s)	Length
1.	"Orgulho (Pride)"	Lucas Silveira	2:29
2.	"Onde Está (Where Is?)"	Lucas Silveira	3:04
3.	"Experiência (Experience)"	Lucas Silveira	2:12
4.	"O Que Sobrou (What Remains)"	Lucas Silveira	4:35
5.	"Verdades Que Tanto Guardei (Truths That Much I Saved)"	Lucas Silveira	4:09
6.	"Duas Lágrimas (Two Tears)"	Lucas Silveira	3:09
7.	"Impossibilidades (Impossibilities)"	Lucas Silveira	3:15
8.	"Velha História (Old Story)"	Lucas Silveira	3:48
9.	"Planos e Promessas (Plans And Promises)"	Lucas Silveira	3:58
10.	"Evaporar (Evaporating)"	Lucas Silveira	4:41
11.	"Outra Vez (Again)"	Lucas Silveira	3:50
12.	"Pergunta (Question)"	Lucas Silveira	4:07
