= French ship Revanche =

List of ships with the same or similar names

French ship Revanche may refer to:

- French frigate Revanche (1795)
- French ironclad Revanche
