= Revanche (album) =

Studio album by Fresno
- Released: July 13, 2010
- Recorded: 2010
- Genres: Alternative rock; emo
- Label: Universal Music

Fresno chronology
| Redenção (2008) | Revanche (2010) |

Singles from Revanche
- 1. "Deixa o Tempo" Released: May 22, 2010; 2. "Eu Sei" Released: December 16, 2010; 3. "Revanche" Released: March 2011; 4. "Porto Alegre" Released: TBR

Revanche (In English: Revenge) is the sixth album from the Brazilian rock band, Fresno, released in 2010, through Universal Music. The album is heavier, musically and lyrically, than their previous album "Redenção".

The album has 13 tracks, ranging from heavy rock to romantic ballads. The album had two singles: "Deixa o tempo" and "Eu Sei". The lyrics are mostly about love and obstacles in life. The musics and the lyrics has much in common with the album's title, it's like a revenge of Fresno, as an answer to all those who criticize the band.

== Cover ==
The album cover is a sky with many shining stars, like the space.

== Track listing ==
| No. | Title | Writer(s) | Length |
|---|---|---|---|
| 1. | "Revanche" (Revenge) | Lucas Silveira, Rodrigo Tavares | 3:10 |
| 2. | "Deixa o Tempo" (Let the Time) | Lucas Silveira, Rodrigo Tavares | 3:49 |
| 3. | "Esteja Aqui" (Be Here) | Lucas Silveira | 3:17 |
| 4. | "Die Lüge" (German: The Lie) | Lucas Silveira, Rodrigo Tavares | 3:58 |
| 5. | "Nesse Lugar" (In This Place) | Lucas Silveira | 3:15 |
| 6. | "Eu Sei" (I Know) | Lucas Silveira, Rodrigo Tavares | 3:14 |
| 7. | "Relato De Um Homem de Bom Coração" (Report Of A Good Heart Man) | Lucas Silveira, Rodrigo Tavares | 4:04 |
| 8. | "Quando Crescer" (When You Grow Up) | Lucas Silveira | 4:17 |
| 9. | "Se Você Voltar" (If You Come Back) | Lucas Silveira, Rodrigo Tavares | 3:25 |
| 10. | "A Minha História Não Acaba Aqui" (My History Doesn't Ends Here) | Lucas Silveira | 4:00 |
| 11. | "Não Leve a Mal" (Don't Misunderstand) | Lucas Silveira, Rodrigo Tavares | 3:23 |
| 12. | "Porto Alegre" | Lucas Silveira, Rodrigo Tavares | 3:47 |
| 13. | "Canção Da Noite (Todo Mundo Precisa de Alguém)" (Night Song (Everybody Needs Someone)) | Lucas Silveira, Rodrigo Tavares | 5:33 |

== Tour ==
A tour promoting the album will start in Porto Alegre on September 26, 2010.

== Sales ==
In the fourth week Top 30 CDs Sales of Hot 100 Brasil, the album reached the top position.

| Sales chart (2010) | Peak position |
|---|---|
| Brazil Hot 100 Brasil - Top 30 CDs Sales | 1 |
| Portugal Hot 100 Portugal - Top 30 CDs Sales | 1 |
