= Ciano (album) =

Studio album by Fresno
- Released: 2006
- Recorded: 2006
- Genres: Emo; Pop-Punk
- Length: 57min 54s
- Label: Terapia Records

Fresno chronology
O Rio, A Cidade, A Árvore (2004)	Ciano (2006)	MTV Ao Vivo 5 Bandas de Rock (2007)

Singles from Ciano
- 1. "Quebre As Correntes" Released: January 27, 2006; 2. "Alguém Que Te Faz Sorrir" Released: December 1, 2006

Ciano (English: Cyan) is the third album from rock band Brazilian Fresno, released on 2006, through the label of Terapia Records.

The album was also released only with the standard version. After his release, the album received favorable reviews in most of the songs. It produced two singles. There's also a bunch of documentaryish videos in youtube, produced by the own band, that show pieces of information not seen before.

== Background and concept ==
In 2006, the third independent album is released. Ciano came up with 14 tracks (11 unreleased and 3 new recordings of album "Quarto dos Livros") and it was then that the band has risen from underground, emerged on MTV Brasil, the song "Quebre As Correntes" gained high rotation on radio stations in the country and received countless music downloads Internet. Also appeared in Multishow, gained prominence in the Trama Virtual and went pro YouTube. The songs and the clips did not go the top of the charts. Was indicated as the MTV Video Music Brasil Choose the audience and were confirmed in Ceará Music.

== Cover ==
The cover features cool colors (white and blue) to the composition of snow and the image of the Eskimo.

== Music ==
Ciano. Blue. A cool color, even depressing. The title of the new disc from Fresno - band that definitely needs no introduction - intelligently summarizes its contents. Listening to it, sensation of ice, winter, leafless trees and wind whistling mournfully is constant. "A Resposta", track that opens the CD, leaves no doubt: it's Fresno.

No escape from the formula "O Rio, A Cidade, A Árvore", the band has become more mature - both in instrumental terms, how to polish a little more to his musical identity. The first single, "Quebre As Correntes" is just one of the five original tracks, the official version featuring subtle differences with respect to the single virtual. Even at the beginning of the album have the well-known "O Que Hoje Você Vê" and "Cada Poça Dessa Rua Tem Um Pouco de Minhas Lágrimas" the latter one of the longest songs composed by Fresno.

"Absolutamente Nada", track four, brings an unusual feature in the compositions of the gauchos, but in Ciano, appears more often: choruses. "Logo Você" as the sun appeared in a sadly cold winter afternoon, breaking the heavy weather of previous songs.

"O Peso do Mundo", this song will turn thousands of emo-kids out there.

"Alguém Que Te Faz Sorrir" complete, full of guitars, drums and everything else that is right. If the acoustic version has ruffled a lot of people, this will fall further. "Soneto Para Petr Cech", beautiful composition that Lucas did on his mother. Beautiful tribute and, without doubt, great song.

"Enferrujou", a song that would fit smoothly into "O Rio, A Cidade, A Árvore". It is known to some old and was fine with the new package.

The last track on the album, "Infância" is one of those songs that make you feel slightly depressed, tempers calmed, many thoughts. Once again the indisputable talent of the boys of infecting listeners with feelings that wish to share, even if you're not paying attention to words.

Finishing the CD, a delightful treat for the fans: "Teu Semblante", "Stonehenge" and "Sono Profundo" - the most beloved songs of "Quarto dos Livros" - re-recorded and clean face. Closing Ciano, "Sono Profundo" in a version a bit softer than the original.

== Release and promotion ==
=== Singles ===
- "Quebre As Correntes" was released to radio.
- "Alguém Que Te Faz Sorrir" not been released to radio but told Brazilian with a music video for the song.

=== Tour ===
Fresno began to support his album on 7 January 2006 in "Elam" in Rio de Janeiro and ended on 31 December 2006 in "Reveillón" in Rio Grande do Sul.

== Track listing ==
No.	Title	Writer(s)	Length
1.	"A Resposta (The Answer)"	Lucas Silveira	3:24
2.	"Quebre As Correntes (Break the Chains)"	Lucas Silveira	3:48
3.	"O Que Hoje Você Vê (What You See Today)"	Lucas Silveira	3:33
4.	"Absolutamente Nada (Absolutely Nothing)"	Lucas Silveira	3:50
5.	"Cada Poça Dessa Rua Tem Um Pouco De Minhas Lágrimas (Every Puddle In The Street Has A little Bit Of my Tears"	Lucas Silveira	5:52
6.	"Logo Você (Just You)"	Lucas Silveira	2:49
7.	"O Peso do Mundo (The Weight of The World)"	Lucas Silveira	3:48
8.	"Alguém Que Te Faz Sorrir (Someone Who Makes You Smile)"	Lucas Silveira	3:21
9.	"Soneto Para Petr Cech (Sonnet For Petr Cech)"	Lucas Silveira	3:30
10.	"Enferrujou (Rusted)"	Lucas Silveira	3:53
11.	"Infância (Childhood)"	Lucas Silveira	6:22

Bonus tracks
No.	Title	Writer(s)	Length
12.	"Teu Semblante (Thy Countenance)"	Lucas Silveira	3:57
13.	"Stonehenge"	Lucas Silveira	4:12
14.	"Sono Profundo (Deep Sleep)"	Lucas Silveira	5:23
