= Johnny Hooker =

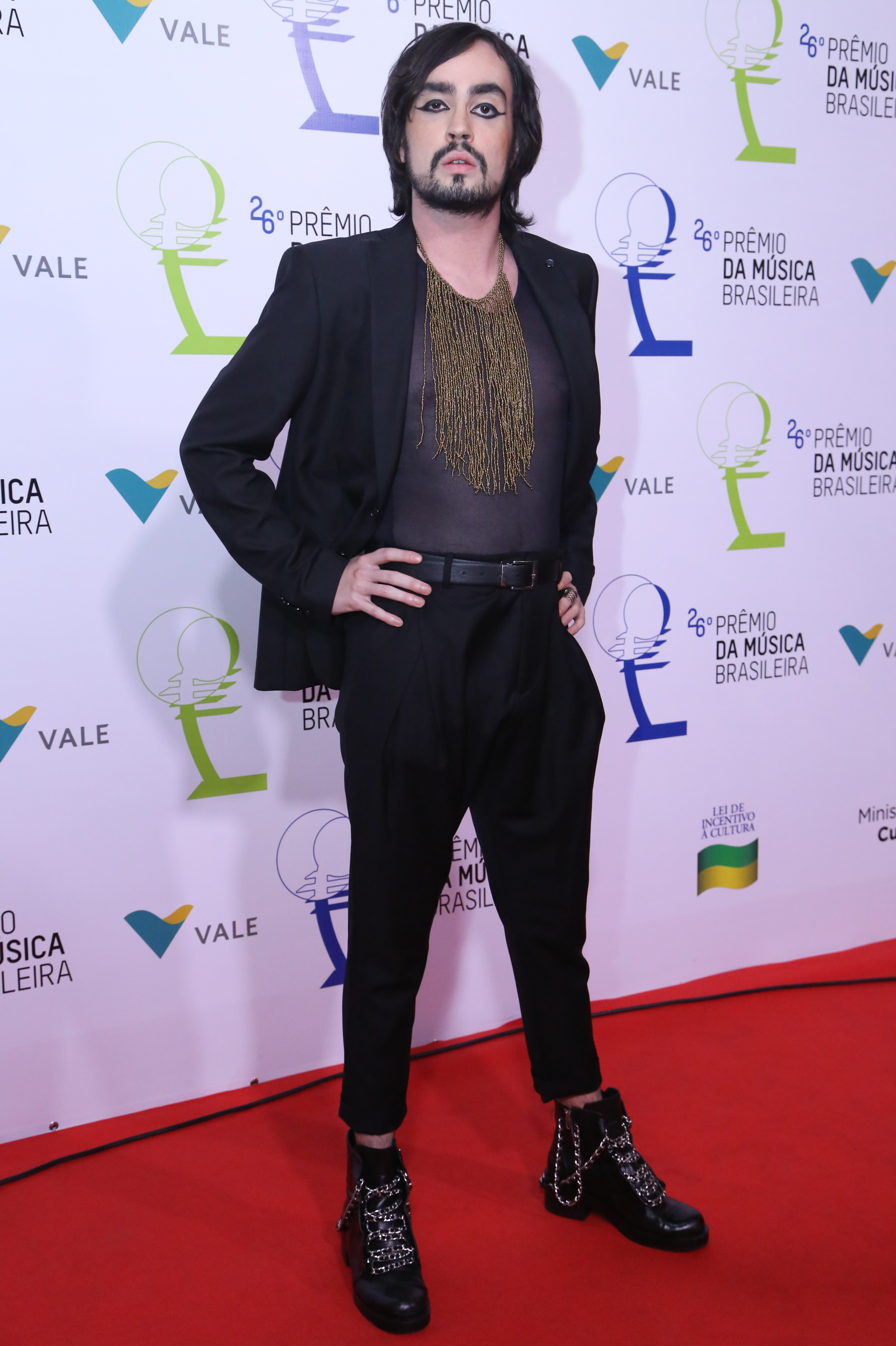
- Johnny Hooker at the 26th Prêmio da Música Brasileira in 2015

Background information
- Born: John Donovan Maia; 6 August 1987 (age 39); Recife, Pernambuco
- Genres: MPB, pop, rock, brega
- Occupations: Musician, songwriter, actor, director, screenwriter
- Years active: 2011–present

John Donovan Maia, more commonly known as Johnny Hooker (Recife, 6 August 1987), is a Brazilian singer-songwriter, actor and screenwriter. He won the Prêmio da Música Brasileira for Best Singer in the Pop Music category.

His music has been featured in soundtracks such as "Volta" (featured in Tatuagem), "Amor Marginal" (featured in Babilônia) and "Alma Sebosa" (featured in Geração Brasil, in which he also played the role of Thales Salgado).

His debut album, Eu Vou Fazer uma Macumba pra Te Amarrar, Maldito! topped Deezer and the MPB iTunes Brasil chart.

== Early life ==
John Donovan Maia was born in Recife, Pernambuco, on 6 August 1987. His grandfather was Irish.

== Career ==
In 2011, he was nominated for Best New Artists at the Prêmio Multishow de Música Brasileira.

In 2009, he made his acting debut in the short film Não me Deixe em Casa, directed by Daniel Aragão, and in 2013 he performed for the soundtrack of the movie Tatuagem, by Hilton Lacerda, in which the singer guest appears to perform the film theme.

In 2014, Hooker was cast as musician Thales Salgado in the Rede Globo telenovela Geração Brasil. One of his songs also appeared among the soundtrack: "Alma Sebosa", theme from the character Barata (Leandro Hassum).

The song later received a video on 27 September 2014. It won an award at the 16th Festcine, in Recife, and was included in many year-end best clips lists. In December 2014, TV presenter and journalist Zeca Camargo praised the song in his personal blog:

In the first semester of 2015, Hooker made his directorial debut with the short film Classic, which he also wrote.

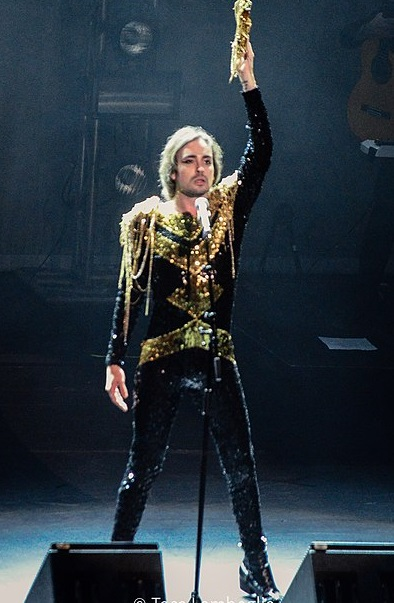
Hooker live in São Paulo in October 2018

"Amor Marginal", from his debut album Eu Vou Fazer Uma Macumba pra te Amarrar, Maldito! was picked for the telenovela Babilônia's soundtrack in 2015.

Eu Vou Fazer uma Macumba pra Te Amarrar, Maldito! was released on 22 February 2015, topping Deezer and reaching #14 on iTunes.

Johnny won the 26th Prêmio da Música Brasileira for Best Singer for the album. During the award ceremony, on 10 June 2015, Johnny sang "Lama" with Alcione as a tribute to Maria Bethânia, gaining press attention.

Fafá de Belém covered the song "Volta", written by Hooker, on her then new album Do Tamanho Certo para meu Sorriso in 2015.

On 20 September 2015, he released a video for "Amor Marginal". The song reached the Brazilian trending topics and the video was viewed over 130,000 times in its first week.

== Filmography ==
- 2009 – Não Me Deixe em Casa (short film) de Daniel Aragão – as Carlos
- 2011 – A Febre do Rato, by Claudio Assis – as amigo do Zizo
- 2013 – A Menina Sem Qualidades, by Felipe Hirsh – as Amigo do Toni
- 2013 – Tatuagem, by Hilton Lacerda – as Johnny Hooker
- 2014 – Geração Brasil, by Denise Saraceni (novela) – as Thales Moreira
- 2016 – O Ateliê da Rua do Brum, by Juliano Dornelles – as Osíris (post-production)
- 2016 – Saudade, by Paulo Caldas (documentário) – entrevistado (post-production)
- 2017 – Berenice Procura, by Allan Fitterman – as Johnny Hooker (filming)

== Discography ==
=== Studio albums ===
- 2015 – Eu Vou Fazer uma Macumba pra Te Amarrar, Maldito!
- 2017 – Coração
- 2022 – ØRGIA

=== As Johnny and The Hookers ===
- 2012 – Roquestar

=== Live albums ===
- 2021 – Macumba – Ao Vivo em Recife

=== EPs ===
- 2004 – The Blink of the Whore's Pussy
- 2007 – Ultra Violence Discotheque
- 2008 – Fire!

== Awards and nominations ==
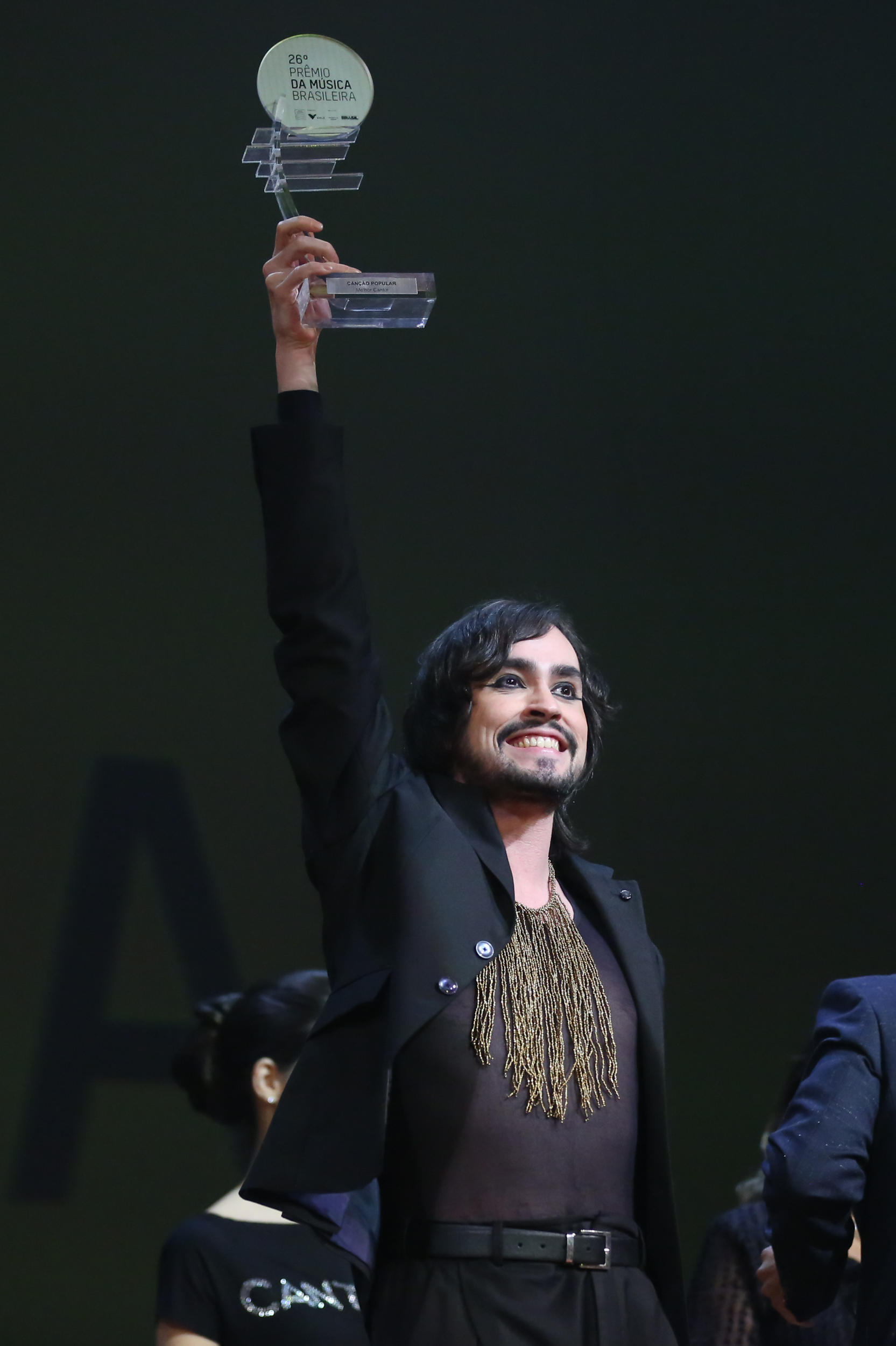
Johnny Hooker after being elected Best Singer on the Pop Music category of the 2015 Prêmio da Música Brasileira

- 2004 – Festival Microfonia (nominated)
- 2004 – Best New Artist at RecifeRock! (nominated)
- 2006 – Festival Microfonia (nominated)
- 2008 – Festival Microfonia (winner)
- 2010 – selected for the Edital Nacional Conexão Vivo
- 2010 – International Songwriting Competition – Dance category (nominated)
- 2010 – Best Show of the Year – Troféu Sonar PE (winner)
- 2010 – Programa Geleia do Rock – Multishow (winner)
- 2011 – Prêmio Multishow de Música Brasileira – best New Artist (nominated)
- 2013 – Video Category – Festcine PE – (second place)
- 2013 – Prêmio Anfitrião 2013 – Best Original Song award for "Volta" (off Tatuagem's soundtrack
- 2014 – Video category – Festcine PE – winner
- 2015 – Best Singer award – Pop Music category – 26º Prêmio da Música Brasileira
- 2015 – UOL Música Year-End Best New Artist (nominated)
- 2015 – Song of the Year for "Eu Vou Fazer Uma Macumba pra Te Amarrar, Maldito!" – second place – Popular Vote – Rolling Stone Brasil
- 2015 – Album of the Year for Eu Vou Fazer Uma Macumba pra Te Amarrar, Maldito! – third place – Popular Vote – Rolling Stone Brasil
- 2015 – Song of the Year for "Eu Vou Fazer Uma Macumba pra Te Amarrar, Maldito!" – winner – Official Judges – Rolling Stone Brasil
- 2015 – Album of the Year for Eu Vou Fazer Uma Macumba pra Te Amarrar, Maldito! – winner – Official Judges – Rolling Stone Brasil
