= O Teatro Mágico =

Brazilian musical group

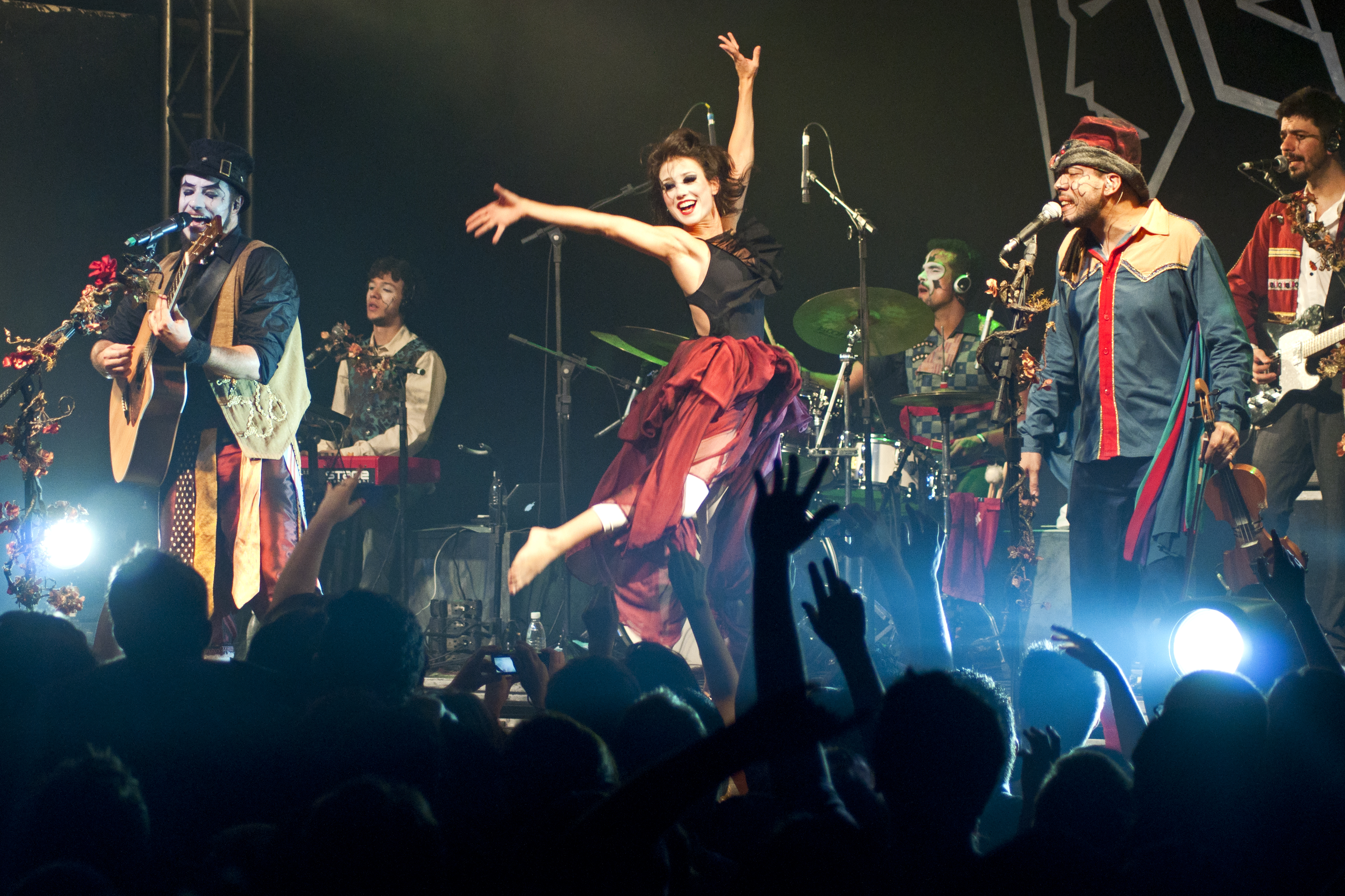
- O Teatro Mágico in a concert held at Opinião, in Porto Alegre, on December 1, 2012.

Background information
- Origin: Osasco, São Paulo, Brazil
- Genres: Folk rock; Pop rock; MPB
- Years active: 2003–present
- Label: Independent
- Members: Fernando Anitelli; Zeca Loureiro; Rafael dos Santos; Maria Fernanda; Emerson Marciano
- Website: www.oteatromagico.mus.br

O Teatro Mágico (literally The Magical Theater) is a Brazilian musical group, formed in 2003. It was created in the municipality of Osasco, in the state of São Paulo by Fernando Anitelli and other seven artists, two being circus performers. The group's purpose goes beyond music and it is to bring literature, performing arts, politics and culture all to one place, with the intention of reaching as many people as possible. The members of the musical group are known for performing on stage with clown make-up and costumes similar to that of a circus. Anitelli and his group work without a record label and are supported mainly by the city of Osasco.

== History ==
Anitelli was in another band called "Madalena 19". With the intention of saving money to record an album, he quit the band and went to the U.S., where he worked as a waiter. It was there where he first came into contact with Hermann Hesse's novel Steppenwolf, in which the protagonist runs into a man advertising "The Magical Theater". Anitelli took inspiration from this and named the album he was working on "The Magical Theater" as a homage to the book.

Anitelli is the main composer and one of the actors, along with other 10 performers: 7 musicians and 3 circus artists. Together, they started a movement called “Musicas Para Baixar – MPB” ("Music for Download", a pun with the brazilian genre of music, MPB) supporting the free sharing of music via the Internet. All of their songs are available online.

== Musical style and influences ==
Fernando Anitelli said in an interview that their influence goes from the bands and singers Secos e Molhados, Dave Matthews Band, Antonio Nóbrega, Chico César, Tom Zé, Silvério Pessoa, Raul Seixas and Legião Urbana, to the writers Hermann Hesse, Mário Quintana, Clarice Lispector, Denise Stoklos and Plínio Marcos.
The group is not only diverse in its genres, but also in its musical instruments. Some of these musical instruments are highlighted, however, such as guitar, violin, electric guitar, bass, drums, flute and DJs.

=== Members ===
Musicians

- Fernando Anitelli (vocals and guitar)
- Zeca Loureiro (guitar)
- Rafael dos Santos (drums)
- Maria Fernanda (violins)
- Emerson Marciano (bass)
- Daniel Santiago
- Pedro Martins

Circus performers

- Wallace Alcantara
- Mateus Bonassa
- Andrea Barbour

== Awards and records ==
- Best National Concert in 2007 by "Folha Nacional de São Paulo";
- Record of Audience in "Virada Cultural" 2007 (40,000 of people in São Paulo) and 30,000 in the same event in 2008 (record of audience for the time on the following Sunday morning);
- The song "Nosso Castelo Pequeno" was indicated to the category "Hit of the Year" at the VMB 2012.
