= Infinito (Fresno album) =

Studio album by Fresno
- Released: July 17, 2012
- Studio: Eco Estúdio
- Genre: Progressive rock; alternative rock
- Length: 43:57
- Producer: Lucas Silveira

Fresno chronology
Cemitério Das Boas Intenções (2011)	Infinito (2012)	Eu Sou A Maré Viva (2014)

Infinito is the sixth album by the band Fresno. The album was released digitally November 1, 2012. It was released physically on November 23. The album has 11 tracks, and is approximately 45 minutes long. The first single was "Infinito" and its video was released on July 17, 2012. The album is available in its entirety on the band's YouTube channel.
