= Maria Gadú =

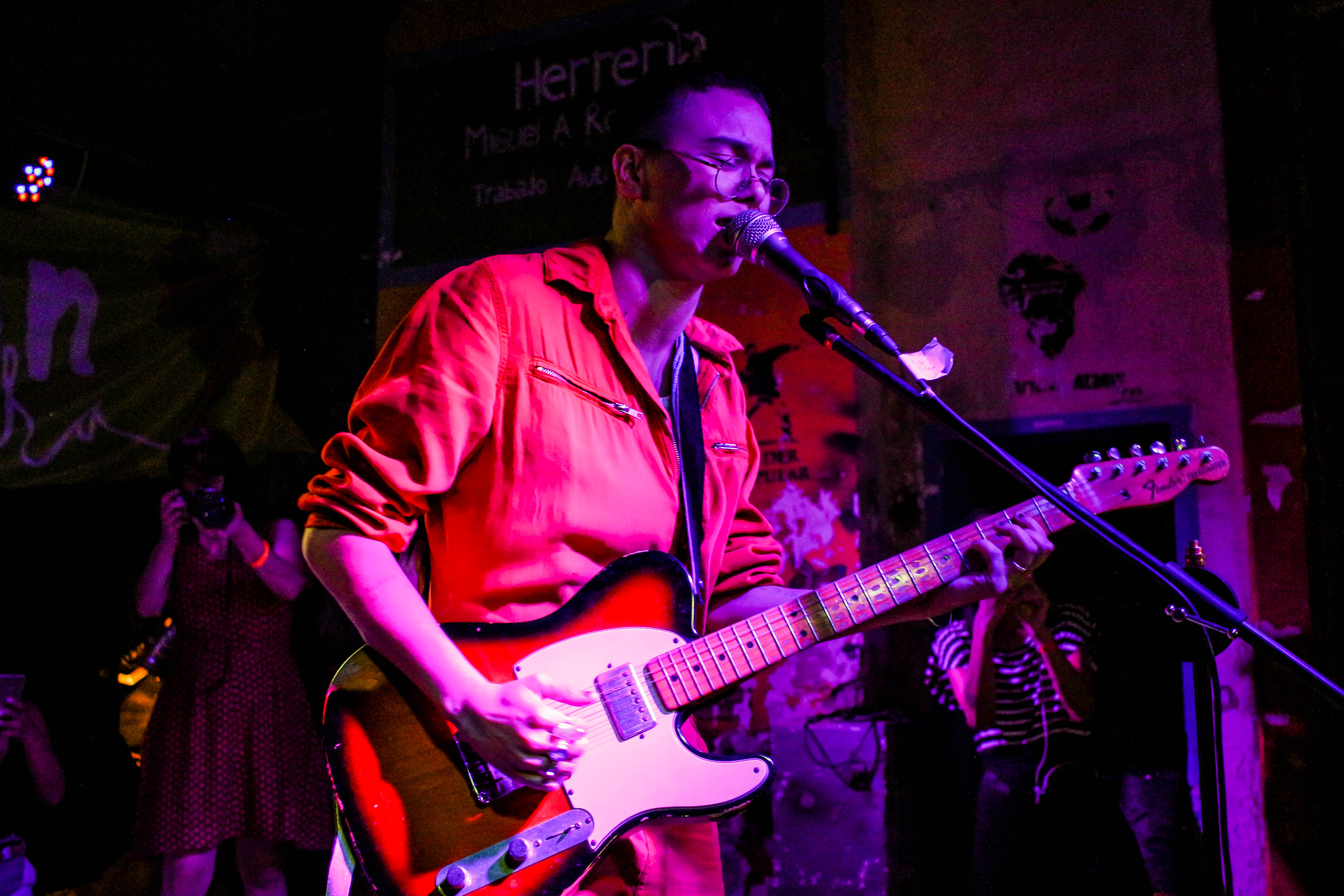
- Gadú performing at Citibank Hall (2018)

Background information
- Born: Mayra Corrêa Aygadoux; 4 December 1986 (age 39); São Paulo, Brazil
- Genres: MPB; pop; samba; bossa nova; rock
- Instruments: Vocals; guitar
- Years active: 2000–present

Mayra Corrêa Aygadoux (born 4 December 1986), known professionally as Maria Gadú, is a Brazilian singer, songwriter and guitarist.

Gadú has been nominated twice for a Latin Grammy Award. She released her first album in 2009, self-titled Maria Gadú. Her single "Shimbalaiê" became a number one hit in Italy during summer 2011, staying atop the FIMI chart for five straight weeks.

== Biography ==
Maria Gadú started playing music as a child after having learned the basics of reading musical notation. Seven years later she began to record songs on cassette tapes. Her real musical training begins at the age of thirteen, when she began to give concerts in the bars of her native São Paulo, playing music by Adoniran Barbosa, Marisa Monte and Chico Buarque.

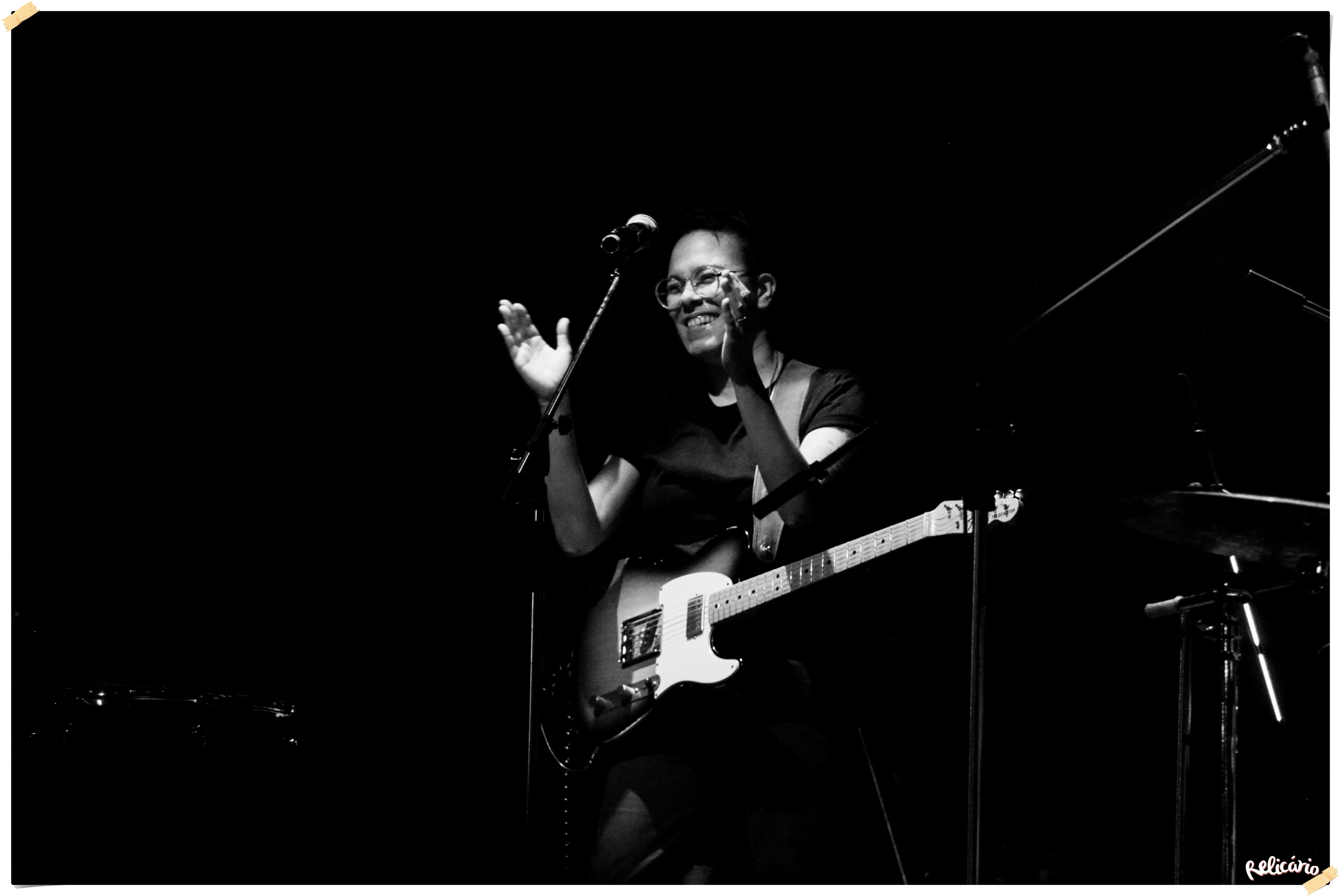
Gadú on stage, 19 June 2016.

In 2008 she moved to Rio de Janeiro and began playing in bars, and she attracted the attention of famous musicians such as Caetano Veloso, Milton Nascimento, João Donato among others. Maria Gadú gained renown playing "Ne me quitte pas" by Jacques Brel for Jayme Monjardim, who was in preproduction of the television series Maysa: Quando Fala o Coração (Maysa – when the heart sings). Maysa Matarazzo, singer and mother of the director, had been very successful in the 1950s and 1960s singing the title song, among others. Gadú's version was soon included in the soundtrack of the series that would premiere in January 2009. Gadú also had a small acting part in the series. As 2009 began, Maria Gadú prepared her first album for the Som Livre sublabel Slap.

Gadú also sang "Blue Velvet" with Tony Bennett on his 2012 CD Viva Duets.

In 2015, her album Guelã was nominated for the 16th Latin Grammy Awards in the Best MPB Album category.

== Discography ==
=== Albums ===
| Title | Details | Peak chart positions | | | Certifications |
| Title | Details | BRA | ITA | POR | Certifications |
|---|---|---|---|---|---|
| Maria Gadú | Released: 20 July 2009; Label: Som Livre; Format: digital download, CD | 4 | 4 | 18 | PMB: 3× Platinum; FIMI: Gold |
| Multishow ao Vivo – Maria Gadú | Released: 2010; Label: Som Livre; Format: digital download, CD, DVD | 7 | — | 10 | PMB: Platinum |
| Maria Gadú e Caetano Veloso – Multishow ao Vivo | Released: 2011; Label: Universal Music; Format: digital download, CD, DVD | 3 | — | 2 | PMB: 2× Platinum |
| Mais Uma Página | Released: 16 December 2011; Label: Som Livre; Format: digital download, CD | 5 | 48 | 22 | PMB: 2× Platinum |
| Nós | Released: 19 July 2013; Label: Som Livre; Format: digital download, CD | 2 | — | 27 | |
| Guelã | Released: 25 May 2015; Label: Som Livre; Format: digital download, CD | 12 | — | — | |
| Guelã Ao Vivo | Released: 2016; Label: Som Livre; Format: digital download, CD | 47 | — | — | |
"—" denotes a recording that did not chart or was not released in that territory.

=== Video albums ===
| Title | Details | Peak chart positions | | Certifications |
| Title | Details | BRA | POR | Certifications |
|---|---|---|---|---|
| Multishow ao Vivo – Maria Gadú | Released: 2010; Label: Som Livre; Format: digital download, CD, DVD | 7 | 10 | PMB: Gold |
| Maria Gadú e Caetano Veloso – Multishow ao Vivo | Released: 2011; Label: Universal Music; Format: digital download, CD, DVD | 3 | 2 | PMB: Platinum |
| Guelã Ao Vivo | Released: 2016; Label: Som Livre; Format: digital download, CD | — | — | |
"—" denotes a recording that did not chart or was not released in that territory.

=== Singles ===
List of singles as lead artist, with selected chart positions, showing year released and album name
| Title | Year | Peak chart positions | | Album |
| Title | Year | BRA | ITA | Album |
|---|---|---|---|---|
| "Shimbalaiê" | 2009 | 5 | 1 | Maria Gadú |
| "Linda Rosa" | 2009 | 34 | — | Maria Gadú |
| "Dona Cila" | 2009 | 48 | — | Maria Gadú |
| "Laranja" (feat. Leandro Léo) | 2009 | 37 | — | Maria Gadú |
| "Bela Flor" | 2009 | 62 | — | Maria Gadú |
| "Rapte-me, Camaleoa" | 2010 | 60 | — | Maria Gadú |
| "João de Barro" | 2010 | 66 | — | Multishow Ao Vivo |
| "Quando Fui Chuva" | 2010 | 33 | — | Multishow Ao Vivo |
| "Lanterna dos Afogados" | 2010 | 65 | — | Multishow Ao Vivo |
| "Oração ao Tempo" | 2011 | 76 | — | Mais uma Página |
| "Like a Rose" | 2011 | 56 | — | Mais uma Página |
| "Em Paz" (feat. 5 a Seco) | 2013 | 62 | — | Nós |
| "Obloco" | 2015 | 34 | — | Guelã |
| "Trovoa" | 2016 | — | — | Guelã Ao Vivo |
"—" denotes a recording that did not chart or was not released in that territory.
