= Fresno (band) =

Brazilian band

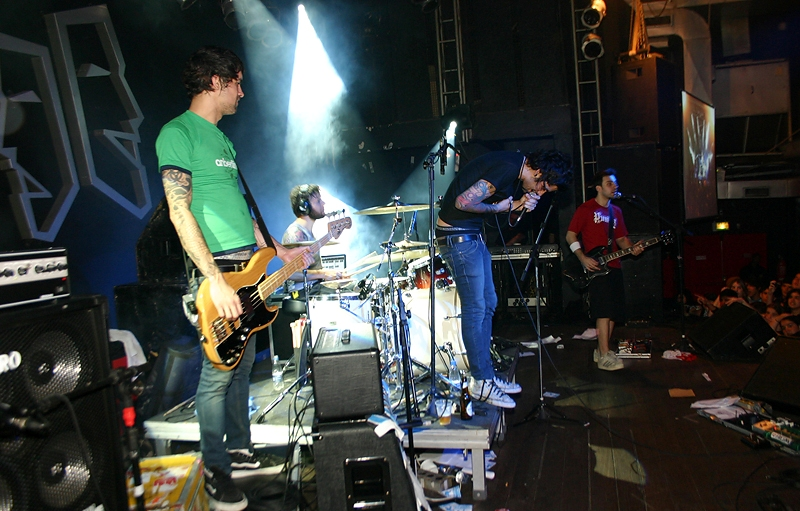

Background information
- Origin: Porto Alegre, Rio Grande do Sul, Brazil
- Genres: Alternative rock; Emo; Pop punk
- Years active: 1999-present
- Label: Universal
- Members: Lucas Silveira; Vavo; Thiago Guerra
- Past members: Esteban; Cuper; Lezo; Mario Camelo; Nego
- Website: www.fresnorock.com.br (in Portuguese)

Fresno is a Brazilian rock band formed in Porto Alegre in late 1999. As of 2026, members are Lucas Silveira (vocals, bass, rhythm guitar, keyboards), Gustavo Mantovani (lead guitar) and Thiago Guerra (drums). The band has released eleven studio albums, with the latest being “Carta de Adeus”, released on April 18th, 2026.

== Biography ==
=== 1999 - 2000: Early days ===
Lucas, Gustavo, Leandro and Pedro met in high school and were part of the student council. After a meeting in late 1999 they had the idea to start a band so they could have fun doing punk versions of pop hits of the time. Lucas and Gustavo played the guitar, Pedro had a drum kit and Leandro would be the singer.

In December 4 of that year the band gathered for the first rehearsal session at Pedro's house, in Porto Alegre. That day is regarded as "date of birth" of the band that would later call itself "Democratas" and ultimately "Fresno".

In June 2000 there was the annual band festival for that school. About a month before that, the boys invited their friend Bruno to play bass in the band and help them do well at the festival, with a setlist comprising cover songs only. It worked out well and Bruno stayed in the band. Soon after that Lucas started songwriting and the band incorporated their own compositions into the next few gigs. As early as 2001 the band was playing its own songs only - songs that would spread across the internet in the shape of rough recordings made at home by Lucas. That's when they changed their name to Fresno.

=== 2001 - 2003: O Acaso do Erro (EP) and Quarto dos Livros ===
In 2001, after discovering another Brazilian outfit called Democratas, the band looked for a new name. After many temporary attempts, Lucas suggested Fresno during a rehearsal, as he thought the word sounded funny. It ended up sticking.

Later that year the band recorded their first EP – O Acaso do Erro, with 6 tracks including local favourites "Seu Namorado É Um Idiota" and "Se Algum Dia Eu Não Acordar". During the recordings, Leandro left the band. Lucas, who had always been the main composer, took over vocal duties and the band became a four-piece.

The EP spread in the Brazilian underground scene thanks to the Internet, and in 2003 the band recorded the independent album Quarto dos Livros, with songs like "Teu Semblante", "Desde Já" and "Stonehenge". The recognition of this work earned Fresno invitations to perform in several Brazilian states.

"Stonehenge" was released in 2003 as the first and only single from Quarto dos Livros. The single was not released to radio but was well received amongst the growing fanbase, and is considered one of Fresno's classics.

The video for "Stonehenge" was the band's first, made as a university project (Lucas and former member Leandro still studied Advertising together at that point). It was shot mostly inside an apartment and on some streets of downtown Porto Alegre, not showing the band.

=== 2004 - 2005: O Rio, A Cidade, A Árvore ===
In 2004 the second album is written and released: O Rio, A Cidade, A Árvore, meaning "the river, the city, the tree" and referring to other uses of the word Fresno. This CD consolidated the band in the national independent music scene and the single "Onde Está" was a huge success. It was the band's first song to get consistent airplay, thus introducing Fresno to a bigger audience. Two different videos were shot to promote this track, both independently and with the help of friends.

In 2005, Fresno starts getting invited to appear in various TV channels (MTV Brasil, Rede Globo, RBS TV). Downloads go through the roof and the group is facing the largest audiences ever seen by them in live shows.

=== 2006 - 2007: Ciano ===
In 2006, the third independent album is released. Ciano came out with 14 tracks (11 unreleased songs and 3 re-recordings of hits from Quarto dos Livros) and it was then that the band really pushed into the mainstream, emerging on MTV with a well-produced video for the single "Quebre as Correntes", which also gained high rotation on radio stations throughout the country. Fresno appeared on cable TV station Multishow, gained prominence in the Trama Virtual music website and joined the YouTube sensation. Fresno was nominated on MTV's Brazilian Video Music Awards (known as VMB) for the Viewer's Choice category.

During this period, Bruno decides to disconnect from the band. He was replaced by Rodrigo Tavares, from a band called Abril, who was a friend of the band and had helped in the production of previous records of Fresno. The change was announced in October 2006.

After 7 years as a hard working independent band, in April 2007 Fresno finally decided to accept an offer and sign with a record label. The band then started working with producer Rick Bonadio.

The band was invited to record the live CD/DVD MTV Ao Vivo: 5 Bandas de Rock, along with four other bands of the so-called new generation of Brazilian rock: NX Zero, Moptop, Hateen and Forfun. This was an opportunity for the band to release a catchy new tune called "Polo"; a music video was made from the DVD footage and received considerable airplay on MTV. The song was a hit.

Also in 2007, Fresno won the Breakthrough Artist award at MTV's VMB Awards. During that ceremony, Lucas did a duet with Brazilian pop sensation Sandy singing her song "Abri os Olhos". The band also featured in Estúdio Coca-Cola playing with reggae artist Armandinho, and in a Christmas special for TV show Superpop.

=== 2008 - 2010: Redenção ===
The year 2008 begins with the realisation of a dream: Fresno plays on the main stage of the Planeta Atlântida, one of the most anticipated (and crowded) festivals in the south of Brazil. April saw the release of Redenção, the band's fourth and the first through a major label, Arsenal Music. Soon after the launch, the first single "Uma Música", was topping charts in radio and MTV.

However, in May 2008, Pedro "Cuper", one of the Fresno's founders, leaves the band. A new drummer is soon called to fill the position: Rodrigo "Bell" Ruschel, who previously played with Tavares in Abril, took on the drumsticks.

Another Estúdio Coca-Cola mash-up session puts Fresno together with Brazilian country legends Chitãozinho & Xororó, a major milestone in the band's ascent in popularity. The partnership is a huge success and further increases Fresno's credibility, particularly with older musicians, who start to take notice.

During the last show of the year, December 14, in Espaço das Américas, Fresno receives from the hands of Rick Bonadio a Gold Record for the sales of Redenção. The band wrapped up a big year with a participation in Rede Globo's New Year special, once again along with Chitãozinho e Xororó.

For 2009, the band finally launches a DVD. O Outro Lado Da Porta brings the band's history told by its own members, interviews, videos and a studio performance with 15 songs.

The project "Bombar no posto ALE" is created and consists of surprise mini-gigs at gas stations of four Brazilian capitals (São Paulo, Rio de Janeiro, Belo Horizonte and Vitória), leading many fans behind the Fresno van to accompany the shows.

Various appearances in TV shows, radio programs, magazines and several concerts are booked across the country showing the success achieved by the band. They receive the Band of the Year award from Multishow on 18/08/09, further solidifying this momentum.

Fresno is the big winner on MTV's VMB Awards for 2009, winning 4 categories in 2009: Best Lead Singer, Best Bass Player, Best Pop Artist and Artist Of The Year.

By the end of 2009, Fresno is close to their fifth studio album, Revanche, already being recorded.

In May 2010 they released a new single from the upcoming record, called "Deixa o Tempo".

=== 2010 - 2011: Revanche ===
On July 13, the band released their fifth studio album, Revanche.

The album mixes heavy and fast songs ("Revanche", "Relato De Um Homem de Bom Coração") and pop ballads ("Não Leve a Mal", "Quando Crescer"). The album lyrics are mostly about love and obstacles in life.

On August 25, the bassist Tavares won the "Best Instrumentist Award" in the Multishow Brazilian Music Awards. The band also competed for the awards of "Band of the Year" and "Best DVD" with O Outro Lado Da Porta but they did not win.

The band was invited for another unusual collaboration when pop old-timers Roupa Nova planned a CD/DVD to commemorate their 30th Anniversary.

In 2011, Fresno released videos for singles "Eu Sei" and "Porto Alegre", the latter a touching look back at their hometown featuring key places, friends and family members.

=== 2011 - 2013: Cemitério das Boas Intenções and Infinito ===
In November 2011 the band announced a four-track EP which was released near Christmas, titled Cemitério das Boas Intenções. The EP surprised fans and musical critics displaying the band in a more aggressive and raw sound.

In March 2012, to the surprise of most fans, bass player Rodrigo Tavares requested to leave the band to focus in his solo side project, Esteban.

Mário Camelo, who had been supporting Fresno live since 2008 as a keyboard player, is now a fixed member in the band, and for now they are performing with the use of a pre-recorded bass track. There are no plans at this stage to seek a replacement for Tavares on bass.

As of April 2012 the band announced they would start recording a new self-produced album. Infinito was released in November 1 via ITunes Store. The good reception amongst band fans resounded with the good critics, which praised the album for its ambitious sound. The songs were streamed in the band's YouTube channel. The lead single, Infinito, was released with the first Brazilian music video with images shot in space.

In 2013, the band also took part in the Europe Music Awards (EMA) by MTV. The event took place in Amsterdam, the Netherlands. The band was chosen to represent Latin America after winning the national vote and the second stage of the competition.

=== 2014 - 2016: Eu Sou a Maré Viva and A Sinfonia de Tudo Que Há ===
Two years after the release of their latest album, "Infinito" (2012), the band released the EP "Eu Sou a Maré Viva". The release features five tracks, including "À Prova De Balas", "Manifesto (feat. Lenine e Emicida)", "Eu Sou A Maré Viva", "O Único A Perder", and "Icarus", all recorded over four days at a country house in the countryside of São Paulo. Of particular note, on the song "Manifesto", Lucas shares vocals with Lenine and rapper Emicida.

Officially released on March 31, 2014, "Eu Sou A Maré Viva" ranked among the best-selling releases on iTunes during its pre-order period.

To celebrate the band's 15th anniversary, their first live album, "Fresno 15 Anos ao Vivo", was released in 2015. It was recorded on October 16, 2014, in the city of São Paulo, with around 2,600 fans from all over Brazil in attendance. It was the first time they performed the song "Acordar" live. In addition to the fans, other artists from the music scene, such as Mi Vieira (Gloria) and Teco Martins (Rancore), were also present.

On September 15, 2016, the band's new album, "A Sinfonia de Tudo Que Há", was announced through Facebook and YouTube. "We recorded an album and you didn't even see it" — said Lucas Silveira joking with the band's fans during the announcement. The album was released on October 13, one month after the video was announced, on all online sales platforms. If on their previous album they had flirted with a heavier sound, this time the quartet opted for a solid and grandiose sound, focusing on impactful lyrics.

Shortly afterward, a trailer for a new three-part video project entitled "Galena" was also released on the band's YouTube channel.

=== 2019 - 2021: Sua Alegria Foi Cancelada and Camelo's Departure from the Band ===
In July 2019, the group released the album "Sua Alegria Foi Cancelada", featuring more melancholic, dark, and politically charged themes and sounds. Lucas Silveira explained that the more sorrowful approach was drawn from the band's origins, but with greater exploration of other aspects of sadness, whether related to romantic or social relationships. He also emphasized the importance of adopting a narrative of reflection and understanding in the face of this inexplicable sadness. Going in the opposite direction from the previous album, "A Sinfonia de Tudo Que Há", which was full of hope, Lucas opened up: "It's an album that carries a sense of sadness".

Featuring a variety of experiments, ranging from electronic music to indie, the band also collaborated with artists such as the trio Tuyo and singer Jade Baraldo, with production handled by the vocalist himself at his home studio. He was also the one who suggested adopting fluorescent yellow for the album's promotion, not only on the album cover but also in posts and profiles across social media.

However, the album's tour was canceled due to the COVID-19 pandemic. The band began planning what would become a historic livestream, QuarentEMO. On the night of April 17, 2020, Lucas hosted a four-hour livestream, performing Fresno hits as well as songs by other groups such as NX Zero, CPM 22, Chitãozinho & Xororó, among others. The livestream raised enough donations for more than 8,000 food baskets to be given to charitable institutions and also featured appearances by Glenn Greenwald and Tavares, the band's former bassist. The livestream ranked #1 on YouTube's trending list and peaked at more than 100,000 simultaneous viewers.

On August 24, 2021, the band announced the departure of keyboardist Mario Camelo through its Facebook and Instagram pages.

=== 2021 - 2023: INVentário and Vou Ter Que Me Virar ===
A week after Camelo's departure was announced, Fresno, now a trio, released the first single from the "INVentário" project, which would bring together previously unreleased songs, as well as songs that had never been included in any concrete project by the band. Lucas noted that, over time, the significant amount of material they had produced had become increasingly apparent, observing that they had always generated more content than they actually released. He emphasized that some creations were not included in the 'final cut', either because they did not meet the band's expectations or because they had emerged at inconvenient times for release. After "INVentário" reached 20 tracks released at a very high frequency, it was compiled into a single album on October 13, 2021. On the same day, the group announced their ninth studio album, "Vou Ter Que Me Virar", less than a month before its release.

On November 5, 2021, "Vou Ter Que Me Virar" was released, a highly versatile album musically, ranging from dance-oriented elements to heavy rock. As usual, the lyrics carry a certain melancholy, but also a great deal of hope, as the band itself explained. Recorded and produced throughout 2020, with the members isolated in their homes, Lucas explained that their intention was to make the lyrics more transparent and unfiltered, in order to genuinely reflect what they were experiencing, believing that this would allow the audience to identify more closely with their work. He pointed out that this approach had always been a constant throughout their previous albums.

The album, which went through more than 40 versions before reaching its final form, features a guest appearance by Lulu Santos on the track "Já Faz Tanto Tempo", which was reportedly recorded in 2019, shortly after the release of "Sua Alegria Foi Cancelada". The album was essentially recorded and produced during the pandemic. Lucas explained that throughout 2020, each member of the band contributed to the project from their own homes. By the end of the year, the album was already finished, and they chose to postpone its release in search of a more suitable time. However, while waiting for that moment to arrive, they continued producing songs.

As they embarked on the successful "Vou Ter Que Me Virar" tour, the band was invited to open the final day of Lollapalooza Brazil 2022 on March 27. That morning, then-STJ minister Raul Araújo, at the request of the Liberal Party (PL), banned acts that could be construed as electoral campaigning at the festival, subject to a fine of R$ 50,000. However, this did not prevent Lucas Silveira from shouting "Fora Bolsonaro" (Bolsonaro out), nor did it stop the band from displaying the phrase on the video screen during the song "Fudeu!!!", which criticizes then-President Jair Bolsonaro.

On 21 July 2023, Fresno released the single "Broken By You", a bilingual song (English/Portuguese) featuring English band McFly.

In August 2023, Fresno's first album, Quarto dos Livros, celebrated its 20th anniversary. To commemorate the occasion, the group held a special livestream on YouTube and TikTok, during which they re-recorded almost the entire album, as well as re-releasing it in vinyl format. Lucas emphasized that the project was not a reinterpretation, but rather a tribute to the album, as it "tells a story contextualized to its time".

=== 2024 - present: Eu Nunca Fui Embora and Carta de Adeus ===
On November 23, 2023, the band released the single "Eu Nunca Fui Embora". The single also received an official music video, which was released the following day. On December 4, 2023, the date considered the band's 24th anniversary, they announced on their social media that their upcoming album, bearing the same title as the single, would be released soon.

On March 28, 2024, the band officially announced the release date for Part 1 of the album: April 5. On April 3, the album was featured in several simultaneous Listening Parties, including events in São Paulo and Porto Alegre. The band's tenth studio release features seven tracks, as well as guest appearances by other artists, such as Pabllo Vittar.

Part 2 of the album was released on September 26 of the same year, also following several listening parties held on September 25. The Porto Alegre listening party took place on September 24. Part 2 features six previously unreleased songs and a new version of the track "Camadas", featuring Chitãozinho e Xororó. In addition, Part 2 includes collaborations with NX Zero, Dead Fish, and Felipe Catto.

Eu Nunca Fui Embora was included in the APCA's list of the 50 best albums of 2024 by the São Paulo Art Critics Association.

At the beginning of 2026, the band announced the release of their eleventh studio album, titled "Carta de Adeus". The release was scheduled for April, accompanied by a promotional strategy that included performing the tracks in their entirety at an unprecedented show at Espaço Unimed in São Paulo on April 18, before the album was officially made available on digital platforms. The project also marked the band's investment in physical formats, with pre-orders opening for CD and vinyl. The release took place as the band celebrated 26 years of their career.

== Band members ==
=== Current members ===
- Lucas Silveira: lead vocals (2001 - present), rhythm guitar (1999 - present), keyboards (1999 - 2010, 2021 - present), bass (2012 - present)
- Gustavo "Vavo" Mantovani: lead guitar, backing vocals (1999 - present)
- Thiago Guerra: drums (2013 - present)

=== Former members ===
- Rodrigo "Esteban" Tavares: bass, backing vocals (2006 - 2012)
- Pedro "Cuper" Cupertino: drums (1999 - 2008)
- Bruno "Lezo" Teixeira: bass, backing vocals (2000 - 2006)
- Leandro "Nego" Pereira: lead vocals (1999 - 2001)
- Rodrigo "Bell" Ruschel: drums (2008 - 2013)
- Mario Camelo: keyboards (2010 - 2021)

=== Touring Musicians ===
- Tom Vicentini: bass (2013–2024)
- Ana Karina Sebastião: bass (2024–present)

== Discography ==
=== Demo albums ===
- (2001) O Acaso do Erro

=== Studio albums ===
- (2003) Quarto dos Livros
- (2004) O Rio, a Cidade, a Árvore
- (2006) Ciano
- (2008) Redenção
- (2010) Revanche
- (2011) Cemitério das Boas Intenções
- (2012) Infinito
- (2014) Eu Sou a Maré Viva
- (2016) A Sinfonia de Tudo Que Há
- (2019) Sua Alegria Foi Cancelada
- (2021) INVentário
- (2021) Vou Ter Que Me Virar
- (2024) Eu Nunca Fui Embora
- (2026) Carta De Adeus

=== Live albums ===
- (2009) O Outro Lado da Porta (DVD)
- (2015) Fresno 15 Anos ao Vivo (DVD)
- (2016) Ciano (Ao Vivo)
- (2019) NATUREZA CAOS:LIVE
- (2023) VTQMV TOUR LIVE
- (2023) Quarto Dos Livros (20 Anos; Live)
- (2025) Ao Vivo no Rio

== Awards ==
=== 2007 ===
- VMB (MTV Video Music Brasil awards)
  - Best New Artist

=== 2008 ===
- VMB (MTV Video Music Brasil awards)
  - Video U Made: Fábio Viana's home-made video for "Uma Música"

=== 2009 ===
- Prêmio Multishow de Música Brasileira (Multishow Brazilian Music Awards)
  - Band of the Year
- VMB (MTV Video Music Brasil awards)
  - Artist of the Year
  - Pop
  - Dream Band—Best Vocalist: Lucas "Paraíba" Silveira
  - Dream Band—Best Bassist: Rodrigo "Esteban" Tavares

=== 2010 ===
- Prêmio Multishow de Música Brasileira - PMMB (Multishow Brazilian Music Awards)
  - Best Instrumentist: Rodrigo "Esteban" Tavares

=== 2013 ===
- EMA (Europe Music Awards)
  - Worldwide Act Latin America
