= Thaeme & Thiago =

Brazilian singing duo

- Origin: Brazil
- Genres: Sertanejo
- Occupations: Singers, songwriters
- Labels: Som Livre, FS Produções Artísticas
- Members: Thaeme (Thaeme Fernanda Mariôto) (2011–present); Thiago (Guilherme Bertoldo) (2013–present)
- Past members: Thiago (José Lazaro Servo) (2011–2013)
- Website: www.thaemeethiago.com.br

Thaeme & Thiago is a Brazilian sertanejo country male-female duo made up of Thaeme Mariôto (known by her mononym Thaeme) and José Lazaro Servo (known by his stage name Thiago). It was formed in 2011. In 2013, it was announced that José Lazaro Servo was being replaced by Guilherme Bertoldo, but without altering the name of the duo.

== Beginnings ==
Thaeme Fernanda Mariôto (born 4 October 1985) was the winner of season 2 of Ídolos broadcast on SBT in 2007. After her win, Sony BMG released her solo 5-track EP Ídolos: Thaeme including her winning song "Rotina". The release was a sold-out. The studio album Thaeme Mariôto: Tudo Certo (English: Thaeme Mariôto: All Right) was released in 5 December 2007 and two singles "Tudo Certo" and her own composition "Ironia". In 2009, she signed a new contract with Lua Music.

In 2011, she joined forces with José Lazaro Servo (born in Maringá on 27 February 1986), who had been sponsored at the beginning of his career by the established sertanejo duo Fernando & Sorocaba.

== Duo career ==
=== 2011–2013 ===
Thaeme Mariôto and José Lazaro Servo joined forces to form a new male-female duo called Thaeme & Thiago. Their debut album, the 13-track release on 30 November 2011 titled Thaeme e Thiago was all composed by Thiago with notable singles being "Ai que dó", "Pisa que eu gamo", "Príncipe encantado", "Barraco" and "Perdeu" and collaborations with Fernando & Sorocaba and Marcos e Belutti. Based on the success, they released the live album Ao vivo em Londrina in 2012 with guest appearances by Gusttavo Lima, Cristiano Araújo and Fernando & Sorocaba and a second album Perto de Mim in 2013 with collaborations from Luan Santana and Marcos e Belutti.

=== Duo 2013–present ===
After José Lazaro Servo quitting the duo, he was replaced by Guilherme Bertoldo.

Prior to joining Thaeme & Thiago, Bertoldo had been part of Grupo Tradição alongside Jefferson Villalva, Wagner Pecóis, Leandro Azevedo, Leonardo Bertoldo and Márcio Adão Pereira, from 2008 onwards, replacing the hugely popular Michel Teló on lead vocals. Teló, lead vocals for the band had left to pursue a solo career after eleven years in the band (1997–2008). Transition had been smooth as Teló clearly explained that it was an amicable decision with no enmity or hard feelings. But Bertoldo couldn't enjoy a similar popularity and soon band members started quitting before the folding of the band.

== Discography ==
(For Thaeme Mariôto solo discography of albums and singles, see her solo career page)

=== Studio albums ===
Year	Album details
2011	Thaeme & Thiago: Type: 1st studio album; Label: Som Livre; Format: CD, Digital Download
2012	Thaeme & Thiago: Ao Vivo em Londrina: Type: 1st live album; Label: Som Livre; Format: CD, Digital Download
2013	Perto de Mim: Type: 2nd studio album; Label: Som Livre; Format: CD, Digital Download
2014	Novos Tempos: Type: 2nd live album; Label: Som Livre; Format: CD, Digital Download
2016	Ethernize: Type: 3rd studio album; Label: Som Livre; Format: CD, Digital Download
2018	Junto e Misturado: Type: 3rd live album; Label: FS Produções Artísticas LTDA; Format: CD, Digital Download
2020	Química: Type: 4th live album; Label: Thaeme & Thiago Produções Artísticas /; Universal Music International: Format: CD, Digital Download

==== Singles ====
Year	Single	Album
2011	"Ai que dó"	Thaeme & Thiago
2012	"Tcha Tcha Tcha" (feat. Cristiano Araújo)	Ao Vivo em Londrina
2012	"365 Dias"	Ao Vivo em Londrina
2012	"Hoje não" (feat. Luan Santana)	Perto de Mim
2012	Sinto Saudade	Perto de Mim
2013	"Foi daquele jeito"	—N/a
2013	"Deserto"	Perto de Mim
2013	"100% Louco" (feat. Lucas Lucco)	—N/a
2013	"Perto de Mim"	Perto de Mim
2013	Cafajeste	Novos Tempos
2014	CDs e Livros	Novos Tempos
2014	Coração Apertado	Novos Tempos
2015	O Que Acontece na Balada	Novos Tempos
2015	Bem Feito	Ethernize
2016	Fica Louca (feat. Gusttavo Lima)	Ethernize
2016	Pra Ter Você Aqui	Ethernize
2016	Nunca Foi Ex	Ethernize
2017	Sarcasmo	—N/a
2017	Dançando e Comemorando (com Pedro Paulo & Alex)	Paredão do PPA
2018	Onde Já Se Viu	Junto e Misturado
2018	Não Desgruda	Junto e Misturado
2019	Casa Pequenininha	Química
2019	Boato	Química
2020	Vendinha (feat. Jorge)	Química
2021	Me assume ou Vaza	—N/a
2022	Viralizou	—N/a
2022	Remedim	—N/a
2023	Trouxa Mesmo	—N/a
2023	Foguete não tem Ré	—N/a
2023	Seu Grande Amor	—N/a
2023	Um Pouco de Nós Dois	—N/a
2024	Mini Saudade	—N/a
2024	Entregador	—N/a
