= 2018 Multishow Brazilian Music Awards =

25th edition of the Multishow Brazilian Music Awards held in 2019

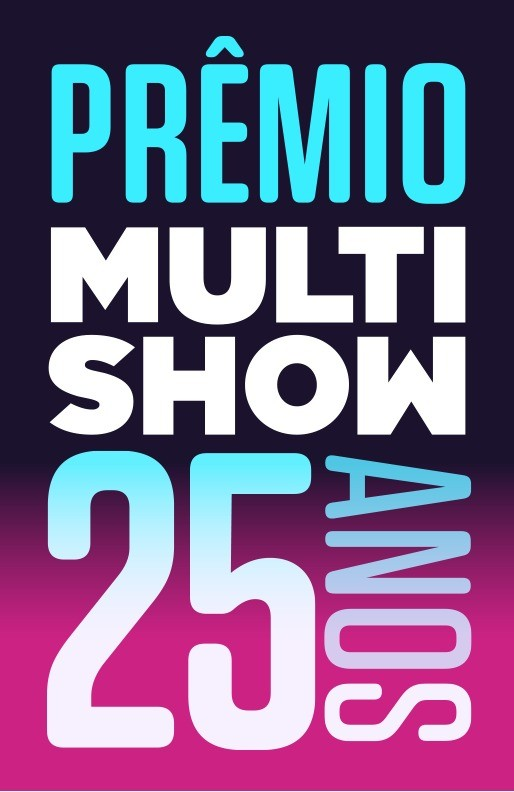
- Date: 25 September 2018
- Location: Jeunesse Arena; Rio de Janeiro, Rio de Janeiro, Brazil
- Hosted by: Anitta; Tatá Werneck

Highlights
- Most awards: Anitta (2)
- Most nominations: Anitta; Luan Santana (5 each)
- Website: gshow.globo.com/multishow/premio-multishow

Television/radio coverage
- Network: Multishow

The 2018 Multishow Brazilian Music Awards (Portuguese: Prêmio Multishow de Música Brasileira 2018) (or simply 2018 Multishow Awards) (Portuguese: Prêmio Multishow 2018) was held on 25 September 2018, at the Jeunesse Arena in Rio de Janeiro, Brazil. Singer Anitta and television presenter Tatá Werneck hosted the show. Anitta and Luan Santana were the most nominated artists with five nominations each. Anitta received the most awards with two awards.

== Performances ==
=== Pre-show ===
List of performers at the premiere ceremony
Artist(s)	Song(s)
Rouge	"Dona da Minha Vida" "Ragatanga" (contains elements of "Não Dá pra Resistir")
Tiago Abravanel Simone Mendes	"Evidências"

=== Main ceremony ===
List of performers at the 2018 Multishow Brazilian Music Awards
Artist(s)	Song(s)
Anitta	Medley "Bem Querer" (Maurício Manieri cover) "Final Feliz" (Jorge Vercillo cover) "As Quatro Estações" (Sandy & Junior cover) "Zen" "Desabafo" (Cláudya and Marcelo D2 cover) "Jeito Sexy" (Fat Family cover) "Qual É?" (Marcelo D2 cover) "Loka" "Ragatanga" (Rouge cover) "Medicina" "Dançando Calypso" (Banda Calypso cover) "Adoleta" (Kelly Key cover) "Pelos Ares" (Adriana Calcanhotto cover) "Movimento da Sanfoninha"
Kevinho	"O Grave Bater" "Rabiola" "Encaixa" "Tá Tum Tum"
Ferrugem Sorriso Maroto	"Pirata e Tesouro" "É Natural"
Zezé Di Camargo & Luciano Daniel	"Pão de Mel" "Adoro Amar Você" "Maus Bocados"
MC Kekel	"Namorar Pra Quê" "Mandella É O Meu Nome" "Amor de verdade" "Partiu"
Pabllo Vittar	"Indestrutível" "Problema Seu" (contains elements of "Nêga" and "K.O.")
Jorge & Mateus	"A Hora é Agora" "Sosseguei" "O Que é Que Tem?" "Propaganda"
Samuel Rosa Paulo Miklos Dinho Ouro Preto João Barone Digão Liminha Marcelo Lobato PJ	"Hey Joe" "Do Seu Lado" "Vou Deixar" "Lourinha Bombril" "Pra Dizer Adeus" "Primeiros Erros (Chove)" "Eu Quero Ver o Oco" "Papo Reto"
Iza	"Dona de Mim" "Ginga" (with Rincon Sapiência)
BaianaSystem	"Forasteiro" "Capim Guiné"
Luan Santana	"Sofazinho" (with Jorge & Mateus) "A" "Vingança" (with MC Kekel)
Tribalistas	"Carnavália" "Velha Infância" "Aliança" "Já Sei Namorar"
Ivete Sangalo	"Um Sinal" "Cheguei pra Te Amar" "O Farol" "Tempo de Alegria"

== Winners and nominees ==
The nominations were announced on 25 June 2018. Anitta and Luan Santana were the most nominated artists, with five nominations each. Anitta was the most awarded artist with two wins. Winners appear first and highlighted in bold.

=== Voted categories ===
The winners of the following categories were chosen by fan votes.

Best Female Singer	Best Male Singer
**Ivete Sangalo**; Anitta; Marília Mendonça; Joelma; Naiara Azevedo	**Luan Santana**; Gusttavo Lima; Léo Santana; MC Kevinho; Wesley Safadão
Best Group	Best Duo
**Rouge**; Sorriso Maroto; Imaginasamba; Turma do Pagode; Harmonia do Samba	**Jorge & Mateus**; Simone & Simaria; Henrique & Juliano; Maiara & Maraisa; Matheus & Kauan
Best Song	Earworm Song
**"Pesadão" – Iza featuring Marcelo Falcão**; "Ausência" – Marília Mendonça; "Cheguei pra Te Amar" – Ivete Sangalo; "2050" – Luan Santana; "Regime Fechado" – Simone & Simaria	**"Vai Malandra" – Anitta, MC Zaac and Maejor featuring Tropkillaz and DJ Yuri Martins**; "Rabiola" – Kevinho; "Check-in" – Luan Santana; "Contatinho" – Nego do Borel featuring Luan Santana; "Dona Maria" – Thiago Brava featuring Jorge
Best Show	Fiat Argo Experimente
**Marília Mendonça**; Luan Santana; Anitta; Simone & Simaria; Bruno & Marrone	**Hungria Hip Hop**; Atitude 67; Gloria Groove; MC Loma e as Gêmeas Lacração; Jonas Esticado
Best Web Cover	Best TVZ Music Video
**Day – "Ao Vivo e A Cores" (Matheus & Kauan featuring Anitta cover)**; Carol & Vitoria – "MC Lençol e DJ Travesseiro" (Luan Santana cover); Gabi Luthai – "O Sol" (Vitor Kley cover); Thayná Bitencourt – "Amor Falso" (Wesley Safadão cover); Ariel Mançanares – "Não Esqueço" (Niara featuring Pabllo Vittar cover)	**"Vai Malandra" – Anitta, MC Zaac and Maejor featuring Tropkillaz and DJ Yuri Martins (Director: Terry Richardson)**; "Indestrutível" – Pabllo Vittar (Director: Bruno Ilogti); "Ta Tum Tum" – Kevinho and Simone & Simaria (Director: Gabriel Zerra); "Romance com Safadeza" – Wesley Safadão and Anitta (Director: Mess Santos); "Din Din Din" – Ludmilla featuring MC Pupio and MC Doguinha (Director: Thiago Calviño)

=== Professional categories ===
Winners of the following categories are chosen by members of the music industry.

Song of the Year	Best Album	New Artist
**"Te Amo Disgraça" – Baco Exu do Blues**; "Banho" – Elza Soares; "Exu nas Escolas" – Elza Soares featuring Edgar; "Todo Homem" – Zeca Veloso, Caetano Veloso, Moreno Veloso and Tom Veloso	**Taurina – Anelis Assumpção**; Deus é Mulher – Elza Soares; Recomeçar – Tim Bernardes	**Baco Exu do Blues**; Edgar; Luedji Luna; Maria Beraldo
