= Cristiano Araújo =

Brazilian singer (1986–2015)

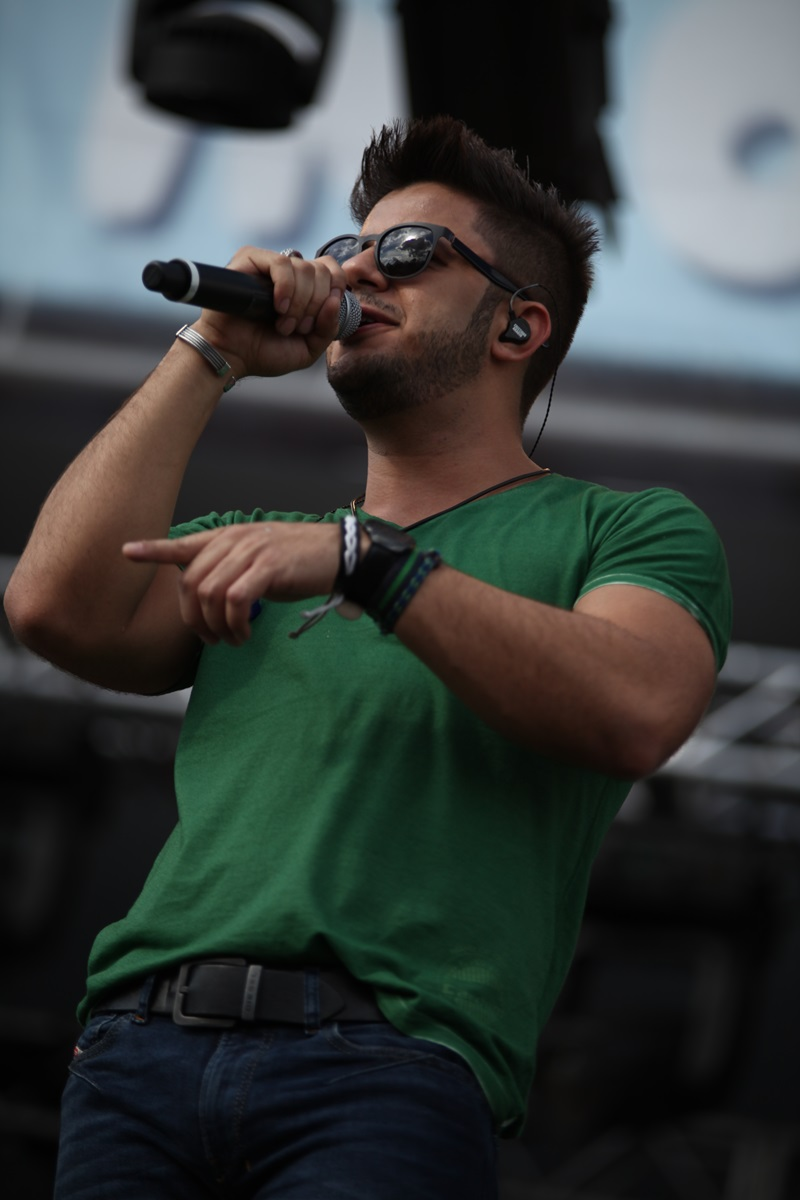
- Araújo in 2014

Background information
- Born: Cristiano de Melo Araújo; January 24, 1986; Goiânia, Goiás, Brazil
- Died: June 24, 2015 (aged 29) Goiânia, Goiás, Brazil
- Genres: Sertanejo, arrocha
- Occupation: Singer-songwriter
- Instruments: Vocals, guitar
- Years active: 1995–2015
- Label: Som Livre

Cristiano de Melo Araújo (January 24, 1986 – June 24, 2015) was a Brazilian singer-songwriter.

Araújo was known for the singles "Efeitos" (2011), "Você mudou" (2012), "Maus bocados" (2013), "Cê que sabe" and "É com ela que eu estou" (both in 2014). After his album Efeitos in 2011 and live álbum/ DVD Ao Vivo em Goiânia in 2012, he released his solo studio album Continua in 2013. In 2014, he released his third live album In The Cities – Ao Vivo em Cuiabá. Araújo was signed to the Brazilian Som Livre record label.

== Career ==
=== Beginnings ===
From early childhood in Goiás, Cristiano Araújo was influenced by sertanejo. Araújo came from a musically inclined family, containing four generations of musicians and singers. His parents João Reis and Zenaide Melo encouraged and supported him in his conquest for a musical career and bought him his first guitar at 6 years old. By age 9, he was putting on public performances and shows. At 10 years old, he was composing songs.

At age 13 he recorded his first EP and performed it during a popular Brazilian TV show, Festival do Faustão. His album was released and quickly shot up to the No. 6 spot in local "região centro oeste" (the midwest) charts. He was then offered the opportunity to include one of his songs in a popular "young talents" or "Jovens Talentos" CD, which would open chances for publicity all over the country.

=== With sister Ana Cristina ===
In the years to come, Araújo would appear on television shows and main events. At 17, he formed a duo with his twin sister Ana Cristina. For the next 6 years six years, they would record many songs and perform together. However, they failed to achieve much commercial success and were only known locally.

=== Solo career ===
In 2010, at age 24, Araujo decided shift to a solo career. He began to have appearances and features with well-established sertanejo artists and duos in preparation for a live CD and DVD. In early 2011, he released a solo album Efeitos with appearances by Gusttavo Lima, Humberto & Ronaldo and by Jorge (from the duo Jorge & Mateus). With encouragement from Jorge (duo Jorge & Mateus), a long time friend, Araújo decided to follow up his newly founded popularity with a country wide tour. In the peak of the tour, he performed an average of 20 shows per month in front of large crowds and sold-out venues. Within a one-year (2011–12) he performed 117 shows.

Araújo ended up being invited to the talk show Domingão do Faustão. This opened up doors for Brazilian appearances at places such as the Sertanejo Pop Festival 2012 held in São Paulo, followed by a live album and DVD Ao Vivo em Goiânia with collaborations from well-known acts like Bruno e Marrone, Fernando & Sorocaba, Israel & Rodolffo and João Reis amongst others. In 2013, he released his first studio album Continua.

In 2014, he released his last DVD titled In The Cities, this being held in Cuiabá (Mato Grosso). The DVD has more than 40 tons of equipment structure. One piece of news revealed is an application launched exclusively – a partnership between the American CIA and Hit Music – which will provide a direct interaction with the audience. In the record of this megaespetáculo is the special participation of international artist Ian Thomas, who is 17 years old.

== Personal life ==
Araújo had four siblings: Ana Cristina Araújo (twin sister), Felipe Araújo, João Vitor, and Nelson Falerio. Araújo had been dating 19-year old, Allana Moraes for one year and two months. Araújo has left behind two sons: Joäo Gabriel, born on February 9, 2009, from his longtime relationship with Luana Rodrigues, and Bernardo, born on January 23, 2013 from another relationship with Elisa Leite.

== Death ==
Araújo, 29, and his girlfriend, Allana Moraes, 19, died in the early morning of June 24, 2015 when the car they were riding in veered off the road and rolled over on the highway BR-153 at km 614, between Morrinhos and Pontalina in Goiás. The accident occurred around 3:30 am, as he was returning from a concert in Itumbiara when his body guard/driver lost control of the car – 2015 Range Rover Sport HSE SD V6. There have been few details released to the public as to what caused the driver to be distracted. However, alcohol or falling asleep were not the factors. Speed (179 km/h on a limited to 110 km/h road), welded rims and lack of safety were factors. The driver and Araujo's manager (who was in the passenger seat) were using seat belts and suffered only minor injuries.

Araújo was sleeping upon Moraes's lap and were in the back seat, without their seat belts. During the crash, Araújo and Moraes were thrown out of the car, causing Araújo severe injuries. Moraes was pronounced dead on the scene from blunt cerebral trauma. Araujo had been stabilized in a municipal hospital, but he did not endure the transfer to a larger, more effective hospital – Hospital de Urgências de Goiânia (Hugo) – and was pronounced dead upon arrival at the trauma center.

The wake was on the same day of his death and was public, so fans could pay respects and mourn. Araújo and Moraes were buried the following day in the same cemetery.

== Discography ==
=== Albums ===
Studio albums

Year	Album	Peak chart positions	Certifications
Year	Album	BRA	Certifications
2013	Continua	7	2× Platinum

Live albums

Year	Album	Peak chart positions	Album
Year	Album	BRA	Album
2011	Efeitos	–	Also available on DVD
2012	Ao Vivo em Goiânia	–	Also available on DVD
2014	In The Cities – Ao Vivo em Cuiabá	6	Also available on DVD

=== Singles ===
Year	Títle	Peak chart positions	Album
Year	Títle	BRA	Album
2011	"Efeitos" (with Jorge)	37	Efeitos Tour 2011-Vol.1
2012	"Me Apego"	30	Ao Vivo em Goiânia
2012	"Você Mudou"	14	Ao Vivo em Goiânia
2012	"Mente Pra Mim"	11	Ao Vivo em Goiânia
2013	"Caso Indefinido"	5	Continua
2013	"Maus Bocados"	4	Continua
2014	"Cê Que Sabe"	4	In the Cities-Ao Vivo em Cuiabá
2014	"É com Ela que Eu Estou"	3	In the Cities-Ao Vivo em Cuiabá
2015	"Hoje Eu Tô Terrível"	3	In the Cities-Ao Vivo em Cuiabá
2016	"Vai Doer" (post mortem)	83	Non-album release

=== Featured in ===
Year	Title	Peak chart positions	Album
Year	Title	BRA	Album
2012	"Tcha Tcha Tcha" (Thaeme & Thiago feat. Cristiano Araújo)	34	Ao Vivo em Londrina
2012	"Pra Não Te Perder" (Zé Neto & Cristiano feat. Cristiano Araújo)	—	Entre Amigos
2013	"Mesmo Longe" (Nando Moreno feat. Cristiano Araújo)	76	Descompromissado-Ao Vivo em Uberlândia
2014	"Tá Soltinha" (Thiago Brava part. Cristiano Araújo e Mr. Catra)	32	Ao Vivo em Goiânia
2014	"Última Dose" (João Neto & Frederico part. Cristiano Araújo)	11	Ao Vivo em Vitória
2015	"Tirei de Letra" (Gabriel & Rafael feat. Cristiano Araújo)	32	DVD G&R
2015	"Confesso" (Babado Novo part. Cristiano Araújo)	—	Non-album release

=== Promotional songs ===
Year	Title	Peak chart positions	Album
Year	Title	BRA	Album
2012	"Assim Você Mata o Papai" (feat. Fernando & Sorocaba)	—	Ao Vivo em Goiânia
2012	"Bara Bara" (part. Bruno & Marrone)	—	Ao Vivo em Goiânia
2012	"Ei, Olha o Som"	—	Continua
2014	"Continua"	—	Continua
2015	"Traição a Queima Roupa" (feat. Jads & Jadson)	33	non-album release

=== Other appearances ===
Year	Title	Album	Artist
2012	"Chorar Por Amor"	Ao Vivo	Israel & Rodolffo
2012	"Delírios"	Delírios-Ao Vivo em Goiânia	Paula Baluart
2012	"Copo de Vinho"	Ao Vivo em Goiânia	Zé Ricardo & Thiago
2013	"Você Vai Ficar Em Mim"	Ao Vivo em Goiânia	Eduardo Melo
2013	"Sem Céu e Sem Chão"	Acústico	Eduardo Costa
2013	"Arrocha da Paixão"	Thiaga Brava Ao Vivo em Goiânia	Thiago Brava
2014	"Gostoso Sentimento"	Leonardo 30 Anos	Leonardo
2014	"Som do Coração"	O Que Acontece No Bar-Volume 6	Hugo & Tiago
2014	"Prometo Tudo"	Ao Vivo em Cuiabá	Anselmo & Rafael
2014	"Boas Festas"	Natal em Família 2	Gaby Amarantos
2015	"Que Tal"	Só Uma História	Kleo Dibah & Rafael
2015	"O Amor Sorrindo Pra Gente"	Made in Coração	Janaynna Targino
2015	"Coração Indisponível"	Forró do Israel	Israel Novaes
2016	"Se Olha no Espelho"	Maiara & Maraisa Ao Vivo em Goiânia	Maiara & Maraisa

== Tours ==
- 2011–2012: Efeitos Tour
- 2013–2014: Continua Tour
- 2014: In The USA Tour
- 2014: Europe Tour
- 2014–2015: In The Cities Tour
