= Simone Mendes =

Brazilian singer-songwriter and instrumentalist (born 1984)

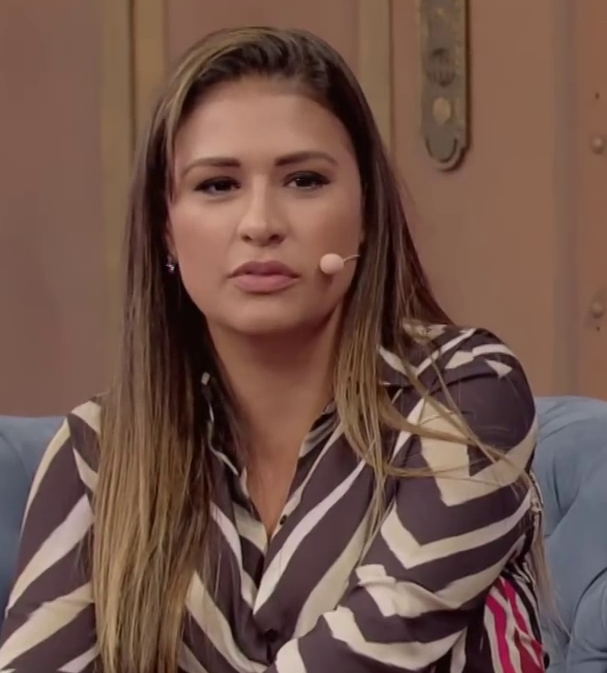

Background information
- Also known as: Simone
- Born: Simone Mendes Rocha; 24 May 1984 (age 42); Uibaí, Bahia, Brazil
- Occupations: Singer; songwriter; instrumentalist
- Years active: 1998–present
- Spouses: Wendel Felício de Albuquerque (m. 2010; div. 2010) Kaka Diniz (m. 2013)
- Musical career
- Genres: Sertanejo; Forró
- Instruments: Vocals; guitar
- Labels: Atração Fonográfica (2004); Social Music (2012–14); Universal (2015–present)

Simone Mendes Rocha Diniz (born 24 May 1984), mononymously known as Simone (Brazilian Portuguese: [siˈmõ.ni]) or Simone Mendes, is a Brazilian singer-songwriter and instrumentalist. She is widely known and recognized in her home-country of Brazil as one of the duo, Simone & Simaria, known as As Coleguinhas. The duo was one of Brazil's most successful sertanejo and forro groups from 2012 to 2022, until both Simone and Simaria Mendes's pursued their solo careers.

Following a highly controversial breakup, Mendes shared her side of the story, revealing that her sister had engaged in a series of arguments, expressing her desire to end her singing career. One of the arguments reportedly occurred after an interview between Simone and a columnist. The group went through a division of items and belongings before officially parting ways on 18 August 2022.

In 2013, Mendes married Kaka Diniz, a Brazilian pilot, investor, and influencer, with whom she has two children, Zaya and Henry Diniz. Prior to this, she was married Wendel Felicio de Albuquerque, a Brazilian investor, in 2010, but the couple divorced the same year.

Simone, together with her sister and Brazilian singer-songwriter Anitta, released "Loka," which became the most watched Brazilian video.

== Biography ==
=== Early life ===
Simone, born Simone Mendes Rocha was born on May 24, 1984, in Uibaí. Her parents are Mara Mendes (born March 10, 1961) and Antonio Filgueira Rocha (born 1950 – June 11, 1994). She experienced poverty as a child and faced the death of her father in June 1994 due to a heart attack during a bath. Before her father's death, Mendes and Rocha also welcomed Caio Mendes. Simone's brother.

On October 31, 2021, while celebrating Halloween (Portuguese: Dia das Bruxas) with her family, Mendes shared one of her teenage ideas on YouTube mentioning that she could have made a lot of money by suing North American immigration agents, but she was too young to understand how it worked:

"Na verdade, naquela época se eu tivesse processado aquele povo (agentes de imigração norte americanos) eu acho que eu tinha ganhado muito dinheiro. Mas eu nem sei como funcionava. Eu era muito novinha" - Simone.

In May 2023, she also revealed that she had been victim to emotional and physical aggression by her own mother throughout her childhood, stating, "Me feriu" (meaning "it hurt me").

=== 1998–2022: Beginnings and career with Simaria ===
Simone began her career at the age of 14, in 1998. Following in her sister's footsteps, she joined singer Frank Aguiar's backing vocals, where she continued with him for the next seven years. In 2007, along with her sister Simaria, she joined Binha Cardoso in the band Forró do Muído, gaining significant recognition in the Northeast of Brazil, especially in the states of Ceará and Rio Grande do Norte. In 2012, the sisters left the band and pursued their musical career independently as a duo, Simone & Simaria, under the Social Music label.

The duo's first album was initially released for download on the artists' website. Throughout their career, they achieved chart success in Brazil. "Como Mel É Bom" reached the 14th position on the Billboard Brasil Hot 100, while the later-release song "126 Hangers" topped the national chart. Their National breakthrough came with the release of their second DVD, Bar das Coleguinhas (2015), recorded in Fortaleza, on November 12, 2014, featuring Wesley Safadão, Tânia Mara and Gabriel Diniz. In 2016, they recorded their third DVD in the city of Goiânia, with guests appearances of Bruno & Marrone and Jorge & Mateus. This project consolidated their success of the previous year after they became popular with the song "Meu Violão e o Nosso Cachorro".

Over the course of their career, Simone & Simaria achieved significant prominence in the music scene, emerging as key players in the wave of female artists within the sertanejo segment. In 2016, they were featured in singer Felipe Araújo's first DVD, "Ao Vivo em Goiânia," performing the track “Me Chama Outra Vez”. In July 2017, they were confirmed as new judges for the talent show "The Voice Kids" on TV Globo. Ending the year on a high note, the duo secured the top position in the Connectmix ranking with the song "Loka", a collaboration with Anitta. The hit gathered 773,242 plays during the year, making it the most played song on radio stations across Brazil. In 2020, Simone and Simaria's single "Deus de Promessas", released in 2018 in collaboration with religious singer Davi Sacer, achieved triple platinum certification by Pro-Música Brasil.

On August 18, 2022, Simone and Simaria announced the end of their duo after a successful ten-year journey. Throughout 2022 they faced public disagreements and had already revealed their intention to take a break. Mendes later disclosed a significant disagreement between them, primarily concerning their carriers, which eventually led to the conclusion of Simone and Simaria as a musical duo.

== Personal life ==
Simone is married to airline pilot and businessman Kaká Diniz, with whom she has two children: Henry, born on August 3, 2014, and Zaya, born on February 22, 2021. Simone met Kaká through her aunt, a jewellery saleswoman, and soon began a relationship. They married on March 8, 2013.
