= 2017 Multishow Brazilian Music Awards =

24th edition of the Multishow Brazilian Music Awards held in 2017

- Date: 24 October 2017
- Location: Jeunesse Arena; Rio de Janeiro, Rio de Janeiro, Brazil
- Hosted by: Fábio Porchat; Tatá Werneck

Highlights
- Most awards: Anitta; Rincon Sapiência (3 each)
- Most nominations: Rincon Sapiência (7)
- Website: gshow.globo.com/multishow/premio-multishow

Television/radio coverage
- Network: Multishow

The 2017 Multishow Brazilian Music Awards (Portuguese: Prêmio Multishow de Música Brasileira 2017) (or simply 2017 Multishow Awards) (Portuguese: Prêmio Multishow 2017) was held on 24 October 2017, at the Jeunesse Arena in Rio de Janeiro, Brazil. Television presenters Fábio Porchat and Tatá Werneck hosted the show.

== Performances ==
=== Pre-show ===
List of performers at the premiere ceremony
Artist(s)	Song(s)
Valesca Popozuda Gretchen	"Pimenta" "Conga Conga Conga"

=== Main ceremony ===
List of performers at the 2017 Multishow Brazilian Music Awards
Artist(s)	Song(s)
Karol Conká Ludmilla	"É O Poder" "Maria da Vila Matilde" "Pagu" "Cheguei"
Nego do Borel	"Esqueci Como Namora" (featuring Maiara & Maraisa)
Maiara & Maraisa	"Bengala e Crochê"
Luan Santana	"Escreve Aí" "Chuva de Arroz" "Acordando o Prédio" "Acertou a Mão"
Anavitória	"True Colors" "Fica" (featuring Matheus & Kauan)
Matheus & Kauan	"Te Assumi Pro Brasil"
Simone & Simaria	"Regime Fechado"
Pabllo Vittar	"Corpo Sensual" "K.O."
Marília Mendonça	"De Quem é a Culpa?"
Thiaguinho	"Energia Surreal"
Projota	"Oh Meu Deus"
Iza	"Pesadão" (featuring Projota) "Rude Boy"
Anitta	"Will I See You" "Is That for Me" "Paradinha" "Sua Cara" (featuring Diplo and Pabllo Vittar)
Marília Mendonça Maiara & Maraisa	"Festa das Patroas"
Simone & Simaria Anitta	"Loka"

== Winners and nominees ==
The nominations were announced on 19 July 2017. Winners are listed first and highlighted in bold.

=== Voted categories ===
The winners of the following categories were chosen by fan votes.

Best Female Singer	Best Male Singer
**Anitta**; Ivete Sangalo; Joelma; Marília Mendonça; Sandy	**Luan Santana**; Lucas Lucco; Thiaguinho; Tiago Iorc; Wesley Safadão
Best Group	Best Show
**Simone & Simaria**; Henrique & Juliano; Maiara & Maraisa; Sorriso Maroto; Turma do Pagode	**Joelma**; Anitta; Luan Santana; Simone & Simaria; Thiaguinho
Best Song	Earworm Song
**"Sim ou Não" – Anitta featuring Maluma**; "Você Partiu Meu Coração" – Nego do Borel featuring Wesley Safadão and Anitta; "Me Espera" – Sandy featuring Tiago Iorc; "Homem de Família" – Gusttavo Lima; "O Nosso Santo Bateu" – Matheus & Kauan	**"Loka" – Simone & Simaria featuring Anitta**; "Acordando o Prédio" – Luan Santana; "Eu Sei de Cor" – Marília Mendonça; "Malandramente" – MC Nego Bam featuring Dennis DJ; "50 Reais" – Naiara Azevedo featuring Maiara & Maraisa
Fiat Argo Experimente	Best TVZ Music Video
**Pabllo Vittar**; Anavitória; Arthur Aguiar; Gustavo Mioto; Iza	**"Acordando o Prédio" – Luan Santana (Director: Alejandro Pérez)**; "Cheguei" – Ludmilla (Director: Felipe Sassi); "Paradinha" – Anitta (Director: Bruno Ilogti); "Tô Apaixonado Nessa Mina" – MC Kevinho (Director: Kondzilla); "K.O." – Pabllo Vittar (Director: João Monteiro)
Best Web Cover
**"Fica" – Luísa Sonza (Anavitória featuring Matheus & Kauan cover)**; "Eu Era" – Ana Gabriela (Marcos & Belutti cover); "Sua Cara" – Gabi Luthai (Major Lazer featuring Anitta and Pabllo Vittar cover); "Paradinha" – Mariana Nolasco (Anitta cover); "Amante Não Tem Lar" – Thayná Bitencourt (Marília Mendonça cover)

=== Professional categories ===
Winners of the following categories were chosen by members of the music industry.

New Artist	Song of the Year
**Rincon Sapiência**; Luiza Lian; Rakta	**"As Caravanas" – Chico Buarque**; "Menino Mimado" – Criolo; "Flutua" – Johnny Hooker and Liniker; "Invisível" – BaianaSystem; "Ponta de Lança" – Rincon Sapiência
Best Album	Best Album Recording
**Letrux em Noite de Climão – Letrux**; Caravanas – Chico Buarque; Galanga Livre – Rincon Sapiência	**Modo Avião – Lucas Santtana**; Caravanas – Chico Buarque; Galanga Livre – Rincon Sapiência; Letrux em Noite de Climão – Letrux
Best Album Cover	Best Album Producer
**Galanga Livre – Rincon Sapiência**; Caravanas – Chico Buarque; Letrux em Noite de Climão – Letrux	**Galanga Livre – Rincon Sapiência**; Caravanas – Chico Buarque; Letrux em Noite de Climão – Letrux
Best Music Video Direction
**"Não Espero Mais" – O Terno**; "Caravanas" – Chico Buarque; "Galanga Livre" – Rincon Sapiência; "Letrux em Noite de Climão" – Letrux
