= Lucas Lucco =

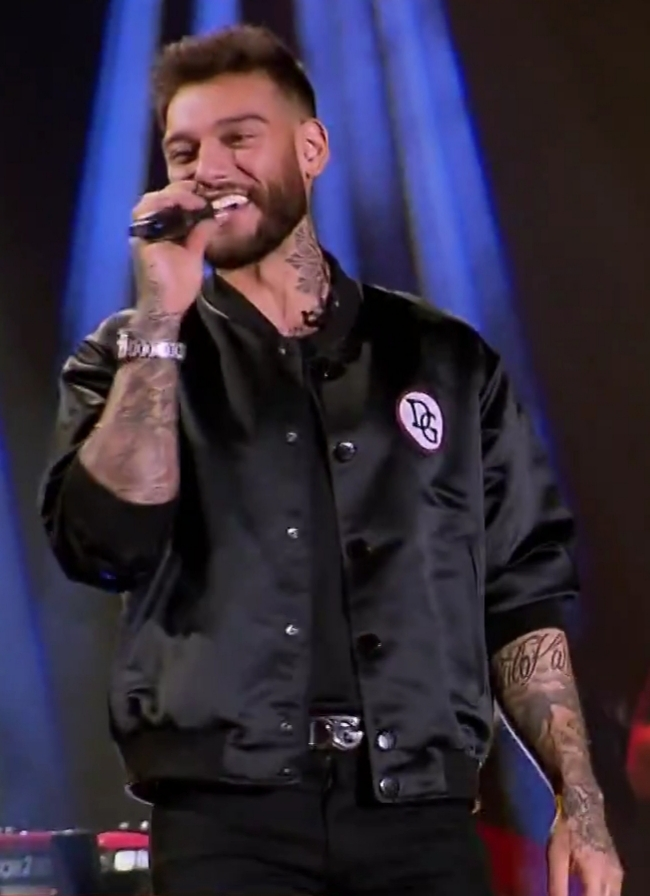

Background information
- Born: Lucas Corrêa de Oliveira; April 4, 1991 (age 35); Patrocínio, Minas Gerais, Brazil
- Genres: Sertanejo, Sertanejo universitário, Pop
- Occupations: Singer, songwriter, actor
- Instruments: Vocals, acoustic guitar, electric guitar
- Years active: 2013–present (singer); 2015–present (actor)
- Labels: Sony Music (2013–present)
- Website: lucaslucco.com.br

Lucas Corrêa de Oliveira, also known by his stage name Lucas Lucco (born April 4, 1991), is a Brazilian singer, songwriter, and actor. He works occasionally as a model, scriptwriter, and director of his own music videos. He has participated in the Brazilian dance competition Dança dos Famosos segment on the TV show Domingão do Faustão and as a reporter for a day on the satirical TV show CQC.

== Biography ==
Lucas was born in Patrocínio, Minas Gerais, to radio broadcaster Paulo Roberto de Oliveira and Karina Luiza Corrêa de Oliveira.

== Career ==
Lucas created his first composition at age 11 called "50%". His first performance was also at 11, at a school festival. He began working as a 13-year-old as an office boy before moving on to becoming a salesman in a shopping mall in Belo Horizonte. Later, he also became a professional model for five years where he came to be known by the name Lucas Corrêa. During this time, he made several photographic essays. He also worked as a promoter. He studied a course on advertising in a college in Patos de Minas, but decided to give it up to dedicate himself to his career. He was also part of a trio sertanejo called "Skypiras".

According to Lucas he got influenced by several artists of the sertanejo music, with his top two being Zezé Di Camargo & Luciano and Jorge & Mateus. Due to the similarity in some songs and visuals, Lucas tends to gain many comparisons with Gusttavo Lima. His artistic name is the junction of three letters of his name with two of his last name: LUC = Lucas, C = Corrêa, O = Oliveira.

=== Early career ===
The beginning of Lucas' musical career started with the recording of the song "Amor Bipolar" in 2011, which was made available on YouTube. Eventually, the businessman Rodrigo Byça saw the video and contacted him. A few days after dropping his modelling career to enter the music scene, he was patronized by the duo Israel & Rodolffo, and they began to perform together. They recorded the song "Previsões".

The singer's song "Pra Te Fazer Lembrar" reached almost 10 million hits on YouTube. A few months later, he released two new singles "Plano B" and "Pac Man", which he later performed at the Caldas Country 2012 festival in Caldas Novas, Goiás. He eventually decided to pursue a new musical style called arrocha, saying: "I used to be more romantic. Then when I saw that 'Plan B,' an arrocha song, worked, I wanted to compose more in this style."

In mid-2012, Lucas released his first album titled "Nem te Conto," which features fifteen tracks. This includes the songs "Na Horizontal" and "Nem te Conto (Sogrão)". In March 2013, Lucas Lucco released his first official video, titled "Princesinha" which surpassed four million views in less than three months.

=== Partnership with the duo Fernando and Sorocaba ===
Singers and businessmen Fernando & Sorocaba invited Lucas to be part of FS Artistic Productions. In addition to being part of the duo's office, Lucas Lucco released a song with them entitled "Foi Daquele Jeito." This song was a re-recording of the original song by Thaeme & Thiago, who were also members of FS Produções. After the release of these songs, Lucas began to be compared to the singer Ricky Martin, who he considers one of his idols. He was also labeled by various media as "the new popstar of Brazilian music."

Her first success after the release of the album "Nem te Conto" was the song "É Treta", in which he talks about the advantage of not being in a relationship. In March 2013, Lucas Lucco released the song "Nobody Could Predict" in honor of the death of Chorão, lead singer of Charlie Brown Jr. Although both songs were different than his usual style, they were still well received by the public. However, he also received some criticism, which he addressed directly: "People did not believe that I was a fan, because I was a sertanejo, but people liked it. It was a way of expressing my affection".

=== Current ===
Lucas Lucco currently does about 25 shows a month and has been successful all over Brazil. Most of his shows happen in the states of Minas Gerais and Goiás. He currently lives in Goiânia. The singer's participation in the media, including television and radio, are on the rise. He also participated in Domingão do Faustão in April 2014.

His first DVD, titled O Destino, was recorded on April 7, 2014, in Patrocínio/MG, his hometown. It includes entries from Anitta, Fernando & Sorocaba, and Maluma. It was made available for pre-order on July 10 by iTunes and was released on DVD on July 22, 2014.

On November 27, 2015, he released his fourth studio album titled "Guess" with two previously released singles "Vai Vendo" and "Quando Deus Quer."

In late 2015, he attended a CrossFit championship in Barra da Tijuca, Rio de Janeiro, called P9 Games.

=== International career and acting career ===
Lucas has built his career on international appeal. He has recorded songs in Spanish and English.

In 2015, he joined the soap opera Malhação, which aired in August 2015. He played the role of Uódson.

Lucas has said he sees himself pursuing acting rather than singing in the future.

== Personal life ==
He is married to model Lorena Carvalho Lucco.

== Discography ==
=== Studio albums ===
Year	Album
2013	Nem Te Conto: Release: December 17, 2013; Label: Damasceno Music; Format: CD, Digital Download
2014	Tá Diferente: Release: January 14, 2014; Label: Sony Music Entertainment; Format: CD, Digital Download
2015	Adivinha: Release: November 27, 2015; Label: Sony Music Entertainment; Format: CD, Digital Download

=== Live albums ===
Year	Album
2014	O Destino – Ao Vivo: Release: July 22, 2014; Label: Sony Music Entertainment; Format: CD, DVD, Digital Download

=== Singles ===
Year	Singles	Album
2012	"Princesinha" (with Mr. Catra)	Nem Te Conto
2012	"Pra te Fazer Lembrar"	Nem Te Conto
2013	"Mozão"	Tá Diferente
2014	"11 Vidas"	O Destino – Ao Vivo
2014	"Destino"	O Destino – Ao Vivo
2015	"Vai Vendo"	O Destino (bonus track version)
2015	"Quando Deus Quer"	Adivinha
2015	"Adivinha"	Adivinha
2016	"Batom Vermelho"	Adivinha
2016	"De Buenas"	TBA

== Filmography ==
=== TV ===
Year	Title	Character	Chain
2014	Dança dos Famosos	The same (participant)	TV Globo
2015–2016	Malhação	Uodson (Uood)	TV Globo

== Books ==
Year	Title	Author	Publishing company	Note
2014	Anjos	Máximo Jr.	Just Editora	Participation as a model
