= Simaria (singer) =

Brazilian singer-songwriter and instrumentalist (born 1982)

Simaria Mendes
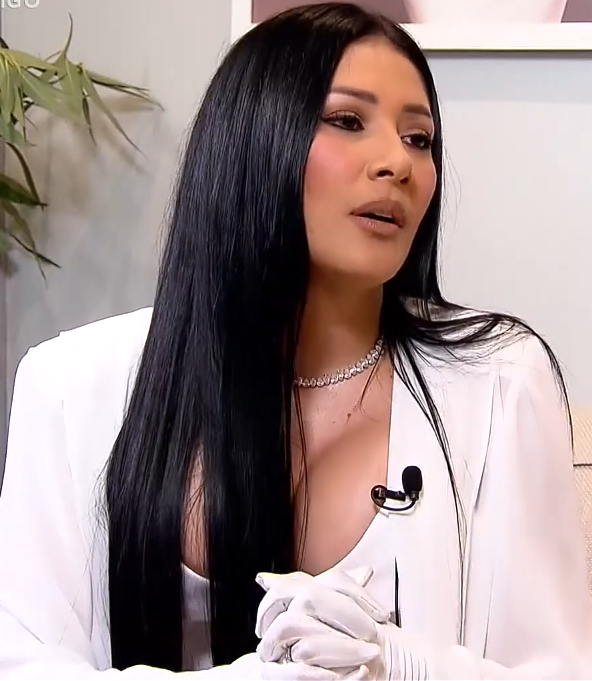
- Simaria in June 2022

Background information
- Also known as: Simaria; A Coleguinha
- Born: Simaria Mendes Rocha; 16 June 1982 (age 44); Uibaí, Bahia, Brazil
- Occupations: Singer; songwriter; instrumentalist
- Years active: 1990s–present
- Spouse: Vicente Escrig (m. 2007; div. 2021)
- Musical career
- Genres: Sertanejo
- Instruments: Vocals; Guitar
- Labels: Atração Fonográfica (2004); Social Music (2012–14); Universal (2015-present)

Simaria Mendes Rocha (born 16 June 1982), known mononymously as Simaria (Brazilian Portuguese: [siˈmɐɾiɐ]) or Simaria Mendes, is a Brazilian singer-songwriter and instrumentalist. She is widely known and recognized in her home-country of Brazil as one of the duo, Simone & Simaria, known as As Coleguinhas. The duo was one of Brazil's most successful sertanejo and forro groups from 2012 to 2022, until both Simone and Simaria Mendes's pursued their solo careers.

Following a highly controversial breakup, the group went through a division of items and belongings before officially parting ways on 18 August 2022.

In 2007 Mendes married Vicente Escrig, a Spanish-Brazilian businessman, with whom she has two children; they but divorced in 2021.

Simaria, together with her sister and Brazilian singer-songwriter Anitta, released "Loka," which became the most watched Brazilian video.

== Biography ==
=== Early life ===
Simaria Mendes Rocha was born on June 16 1982 in Uibaí, Bahia, daughter of Mara Mendes and Antonio Rocha, who suffered a fatal heart attack in 1994. Mendes would later have a baby sister, Simone and baby brother Caio.Simaria took part in the project of the Russian musician De Angelo, the album Chora Boy 2025

=== Start of career ===
In the 90s Simaria Mendes was one of the backing vocalists of singer Frank Aguiar who later was an influence for Simone, who later would also start a singing career.

=== 2007-12: Forró do Muído ===
In 2007 the sister formed the band Forró do Muído, which had a lot of success in the "nordeste" of Brazil at the time. In 2012, Simaria and Simone left the band in order to pursue a duo.

=== 2012-2022: Simone & Simaria ===
In 2012 Simaria and her sister Simone formed a successful sertanejo group. The duo became one of the best-selling in Brazil and has music videos with hundreds of millions of views by 2022.

== Personal life ==
In 2007, Simaria married the then Spanish businessman, Vicente Escrig, after they met on the app Orkut, but after 14 years the marriage came to an end.

=== Relationship with Simone ===
In 2022, Simaria took a break from the duo and Simone had to perform by herself. This caused speculations that the duo had separated and that the sisters had fought. In August 2022, Simaria compareceu ao aniversário de seu sobrinho, Henry Mendes Diniz. Ending the speculation.
