= Bará Berê =

- French release cover (EMI France)

Studio album by Alex Ferrari
- Released: December 18, 2012
- Recorded: Brazil, 2011
- Genre: Sertanejo
- Label: Ultra Records; EMI (France)

Bará Berê is the debut album of the Brazilian Sertanejo singer Alex Ferrari released on 18 December 2012 on Ultra Records, and containing the two singles "Bara Bará Bere Berê" and "Guere Guerê". Based on his version of "Bara Bará Bere Berê", the album appeared for one week in SNEP, the French Albums Chart with Additional Production by Giulietto Kronika & DeeJay Trip.

== Track list ==
1. "Bara Bará Bere Berê" (original mix) (3:41) (Giulietto Kronika production)
2. "Guere Guerê (2:59)
3. "Te Pego e Pa" (3:08)
4. "E o Bicho" (3:04)
5. "Sanfona Mix" (3:18)
6. "Eta Eta" (2:47)
7. "Caldeirao" (3:18)
8. "Danca do Dj" (3:24)
9. "Mexe No Ap (3:08)
10. "Ulele Ulala" (2:44)
11. "Bota Pra Mexer" (3:15)
12. "Te Querer" (3:05)

== Charts ==
| Chart (2012) | Peak position |
|---|---|
| French Albums Chart | 191 |
