= List of awards and nominations received by Marília Mendonça =

This is a list of awards and nominations received by Marília Mendonça, a Brazilian singer. She had been active from 2011, when she was 16, up until her death in 2021.

== Awards and nominations ==
Year	Award	Category	Nominee/work	Result	Ref.
2016	Melhores do Ano	Best Female Singer	Marília Mendonça	Nominated	
2017	Troféu Imprensa	Revelation of the Year	Marília Mendonça	Won	
2017	Troféu Internet	Revelation of the Year	Marília Mendonça	Won	
2017	Prêmio Contigo! Online	Best Female Singer	Marília Mendonça	Nominated	
2017	Prêmio Jovem Brasileiro	Best Female Singer	Marília Mendonça	Nominated	
2017	Prêmio Jovem Brasileiro	Best Show	Marília Mendonça	Nominated	
2017	Meus Prêmios Nick	Cantora ou Dupla Favorita	Marília Mendonça	Nominated	
2017	Multishow Brazilian Music Award	Best Female Singer	Marília Mendonça	Nominated	
2017	Multishow Brazilian Music Award	Music Gossip	"Eu Sei de Cor"	Nominated	
2017	Melhores do Ano	Best Female Singer	Marília Mendonça	Nominated	
2017	Latin Grammy Awards	Best Sertaneja Music Album	Realidade	Nominated	
2018	Troféu Imprensa	Best Female Singer	Marília Mendonça	Won	
2018	Troféu Internet	Best Female Singer	Marília Mendonça	Won	
2018	Prêmio Contigoǃ Online	Best Female Singer	Marília Mendonça	Nominated	
2018	Prêmio Jovem Brasileiro	Best Female Singer	Marília Mendonça	Nominated	
2018	Multishow Brazilian Music Award	Best Female Singer	Marília Mendonça	Nominated	
2018	Multishow Brazilian Music Award	Musician of the Year	"Ausência"	Nominated	
2018	Multishow Brazilian Music Award	Best Show	Marília Mendonça	Won	
2019	Troféu Imprensa	Best Female Singer	Marília Mendonça	Nominated	
2019	Troféu Internet	Best Female Singer	Marília Mendonça	Won	
2019	Prêmio Jovem Brasileiro	Best Female Singer	Marília Mendonça	Nominated	
2019	Meus Prêmios Nick	Artista Musical Favorito	Marília Mendonça	Nominated	
2019	Multishow Brazilian Music Award	Best Female Singer	Marília Mendonça	Nominated	
2019	Multishow Brazilian Music Award	Best Video TVZ	"Bem Pior Que Eu"	Nominated	
2019	Multishow Brazilian Music Award	Best Show	Marília Mendonça	Won	
2019	Latin Grammy Awards	Best Sertaneja Music Album	Todos os Cantos	Won	
2019	Melhores do Ano	Best Female Singer	Marília Mendonça	Won	
2019	Prêmio Contigo! Online	Best Female Singer	Marília Mendonça	Nominated	
2019	Prêmio Contigo! Online	Musician of the Year	"Todo Mundo Vai Sofrer"	Won	
2020	Multishow Brazilian Music Award	Best Female Singer	Marília Mendonça	Nominated	
2020	Multishow Brazilian Music Award	Best Show	Marília Mendonça	Won	
2020	MTV Millennial Awards Brazil	Live das Lives	Marília Mendonça	Nominated	
2020	MTV Millennial Awards Brazil	Hino de Karaoke em Casa	"Supera"	Won	
2020	Prêmio Jovem Brasileiro	Melhor Live	Marília Mendonça	Nominated	
2020	Prêmio iBest	Canais de Música	Marília Mendonça	Nominated	
2020	Prêmio iBest	Personalidades	Marília Mendonça	Nominated	
2021	Multishow Brazilian Music Award	Best Female Singer	Marília Mendonça	Won	
2021	Latin Grammy Awards	Best Sertaneja Music Album	Patroas	Nominated	
2021	WME Awards	Videoclip	"Esqueça-me se For Capaz"	Won	
2021	WME Awards	Mainstream Music	"Troco de Calçada"	Won	
2021	WME Awards	Songwriter	Marília Mendonça	Won	
2021	Prêmio iBest	Influenciador do Ano: Goiás	Marília Mendonça	3rd place	
2021	Prêmio iBest	Influenciador do Ano: Goiás	Marília Mendonça	2nd place	
2021	Prêmio iBest	Personalidade de Música	Marília Mendonça	3rd place	
2021	Melhores do Ano - RD1	Best Singer	Marília Mendonça	Won	
2021	Prêmio F5	Best Singer	Marília Mendonça	Won	
2021	Melhores do Ano NaTelinha	Música	Marília Mendonça	Won	
2021	Splash Awards	Melhor Artista Musical	Marília Mendonça	Won	
2021	Splash Awards	Best Musician	"Esqueça-Me Se For Capaz"	Won	
2021	Prêmio Área VIP	Best Singer	Marília Mendonça	Won	
2022	MTV Millennial Awards Brasil	Hino de Karaokê	"Esqueça-Me Se For Capaz"	Won	
