= Guere Guerê =

Single by Alex Ferrari
- Released: November 2012
- Genre: Sertanejo, Dance music
- Label: EMI Music (France)
- Songwriters: Tom Snare; Alex Ferrari; Claudio Vasconcelos; Arnaldo Braga Cardoso; Francesco Fortaleza

Alex Ferrari singles chronology
"Bara Bará Bere Berê" (2012)	"Guere Guerê" (2012)

Music video
- "Guere Guerê" by Alex Ferrari on YouTube

"Guere Guerê" (alternatively written as Gueré) is the follow-up single of Brazilian sertanejo singer Alex Ferrari, based on his international success "Bara Bará Bere Berê". Its release in France coincided with the release of his debut international album Bara Bere that also includes "Bara Bará Bere Berê".

== Track list ==
- "Guere Guerê"
- "Guere Guerê" (extended mix)
- "Guere Guerê" (PBO Gala remix)

== Charts ==
Chart (2012)	Peak position
France (SNEP)	175
Poland Dance (ZPAV)	35
