= Escrig =

Escrig is a Spanish surname that can be also found in Brazil and Chile but is originally from the area of Valencia and Catalonia.

Notable people with the surname include:

- Álex Escrig (born 2004), Spanish motorcycle racer
- Simaria (singer) (born 1982), Brazilian singer-songwriter
