= Thaeme Mariôto =

Brazilian singer

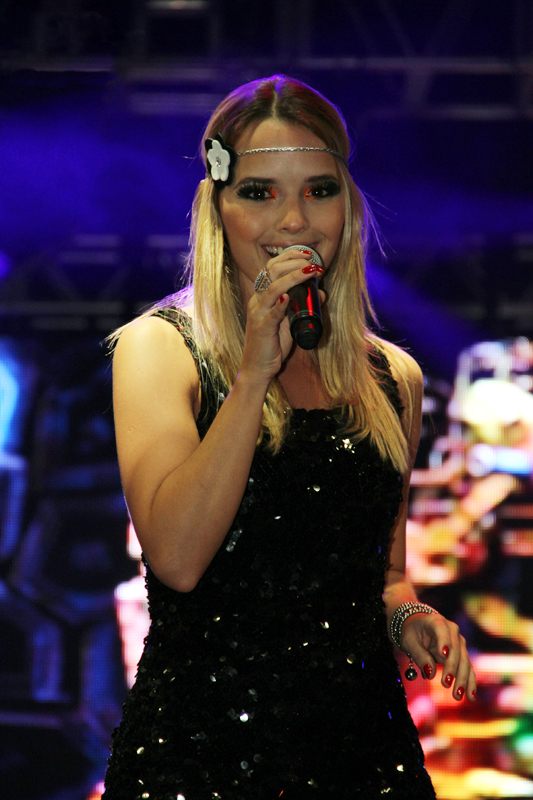

Background information
- Born: Thaeme Mariôto; October 4, 1985 (age 40)
- Origin: Presidente Prudente, Brazil
- Genres: Sertanejo, Pop
- Occupations: Singer, songwriter
- Years active: 2007–present
- Labels: Sony BMG (2007–2008); Lua Music (2009–2010)

Thaeme Mariôto (born October 4, 1985) is a Brazilian pop singer and songwriter. She rose to fame after winning the second season of the reality television show Ídolos Brazil. After Idolos, she enjoyed a solo career, prior to joining the sertanejo duo Thaeme & Thiago alongside Thiago (real name José Lazaro Servo).

== Biography ==
Thaeme was born on October 4, 1985, in Presidente Prudente, São Paulo, but was raised in Jaguapitã, Paraná. Thaeme began singing in the church choir in her hometown and never looked back. Teamed with her sister Priscilla and appeared in several TV shows, including Rede Record's Eliana's Talent Kids.

Thaeme's musical inspirations include Música popular brasileira and jazz divas. In 2009, she was elected as one of VIP Magazine's 100+ Sexies.

== Ídolos Brazil ==
=== Overview ===
Mariôto auditioned for the second season of Ídolos Brazil in Florianópolis, Santa Catarina.

=== Performances ===
Week #	Theme	Song Choice	Original Artist	Order #	Result
Audition	Auditioner's Choice	"Os Outros"	Kid Abelha	N/A	Advanced
Theater	First Solo	"Eu Tive Um Sonho"	Kid Abelha	N/A	Advanced
Top 32	Top 16 Women	"Me Chama"	Lobão	7	Advanced
Top 12	My Idol	"Como Eu Quero"	Kid Abelha	2	Bottom 2
Top 10	Male Singers	"Por Onde Andei"	Nando Reis	9	Safe
Top 9	Jovem Pan Number 1 Hits	"Amor Perfeito"	Claudia Leitte	7	Safe
Top 8	Dedicate A Song	"A Sua"	Marisa Monte	7	Safe
Top 7	Female Singers	"Agora Só Falta Você"	Rita Lee	1	Safe
Top 6	Skank	"Tanto"	Skank	4	Bottom 2
Top 5	Popular Classics	"Nem Um Toque"	Rosana	3	Safe
Top 5	Popular Classics	"Agüenta Coração"	José Augusto	8	Safe
Top 4	Raul Seixas	"Maluco Beleza "	Raul Seixas	2	Safe
Top 4	Contestant's Choice	"Espirais"	Marjorie Estiano	6	Safe
Top 3	Fans' Choice	"Os Outros"	Leoni	1	Safe
Top 3	Fans' Choice	"Sozinho"	Caetano Veloso	4	Safe
Top 2	Judges' Choice	"Devolva-me"	Adriana Calcanhotto	1	Winner
Top 2	Best of the Season	"Por Onde Andei"	Nando Reis	3	Winner
Top 2	Winner's Single	"Rotina"	Thaeme Mariôto	5	Winner

== Career ==
=== 2007–08: Idol Fame ===
Mariôto signed a recording contract with Sony BMG, managed by SBT in August 2007, as part of her Ídolos Brazil prize package. The contract expired late 2008.

Few weeks after the show's season finale, Sony BMG executives released Ídolos: Thaeme, a special album that contains only five tracks (sang during the show by Thaeme), including her Ídolos coronation song "Rotina". In less than a week, the first edition of the CD sold out in all the virtual stores: first place among the best sellers.

Studio recording sessions for the eponymous major label debut Thaeme Mariôto: Tudo Certo (English: Thaeme Mariôto: All Right) ran in São Paulo, São Paulo, started in September 2006 and finished in November in the same year and was released on December 5, 2007, with the song "Rotina" (English: Routine) as her first single.

After "Rotina", she released two new singles "Tudo Certo" (English: All Right), which was later recorded by singer Luiza Possi. and "Ironia" (English: Irony), a song that was written by her own. A music video was filmed for that single and first premiered on August 31, 2008, on Thaeme's official YouTube channel.

=== 2009–10: Post-Idol ===
In early-2009, Mariôto signed a recording contract with Lua Music. She rode three shows for specific audiences and recorded an album with many new songs including "Até os Anjos Choram" (English: Even Angels Cry), which including rapper Helião, from RZO, as first single. A music video was filmed late, 2009, and first premiered on December 21, 2009, on Thaeme's official YouTube channel. However, the album did not come out.

=== 2011–present: Thaeme & Thiago ===
In 2011, Thaeme signed a new recording contract with Som Livre and is now the female part of the sertanejo–country duo Thaeme & Thiago. They released two studio albums and were managed by Socoraba from the duo Fernando & Sorocaba, a popular sertanejo–country duo.

In 2022, she performed cosplayed as a butterfly in the reality singing competition The Masked Singer Brasil.

== Discography ==
=== Studio albums ===
Solo albums

Year	Album details	Certifications (sales threshold)
2007	Ídolos: Thaeme: Released: 2007; Label: Sony BMG; Format: EP	BRA: 20.000
2007	Thaeme Mariôto: Tudo Certo: Released: 2007; Label: Sony BMG; Format: CD	BRA: 60.000

Thaeme & Thiago

(for details, refer to Thaeme & Thiago page)

- 2011: Thaeme & Thiago
- 2012: Thaeme & Thiago: Ao Vivo em Londrina
- 2013: Perto de Mim

=== Singles ===
Solo singles

Year	Single	Album
2007	"Rotina"	Thaeme Mariôto: Tudo Certo
2008	"Tudo Certo"	Thaeme Mariôto: Tudo Certo
2008	"Ironia"	Thaeme Mariôto: Tudo Certo
2009	"Voltar Atrás"	Non-album single
2009	"Até Os Anjos Choram" (feat. Helião RZO)	Non-album single

Featured in

- 2011: "06 de Janeiro de 2003" (Fernando & Sorocaba featuring Thaeme Mariôto)

Thaeme & Thiago

(for details, refer to Thaeme & Thiago page)

=== Soundtracks ===
Year	Song	Soundtrack Album
2007	"Na Guerra e Na Paz"	Amigas & Rivais
2007	"Rotina"	Amigas & Rivais
2008	"Antes do Fim"	Amor e Intrigas
2009	"Over the Rainbow"	Vende-se um Véu de Noiva

Preceded by Leandro Lopes	Ídolos Brazil winner 2007	Succeeded by Rafael Barreto

Preceded by Deixo A Voz Me Levar	Ídolos winner's singles Rotina (2007)	Succeeded by Pensando em Você
