= Henrique & Juliano =

Brazilian musical duo

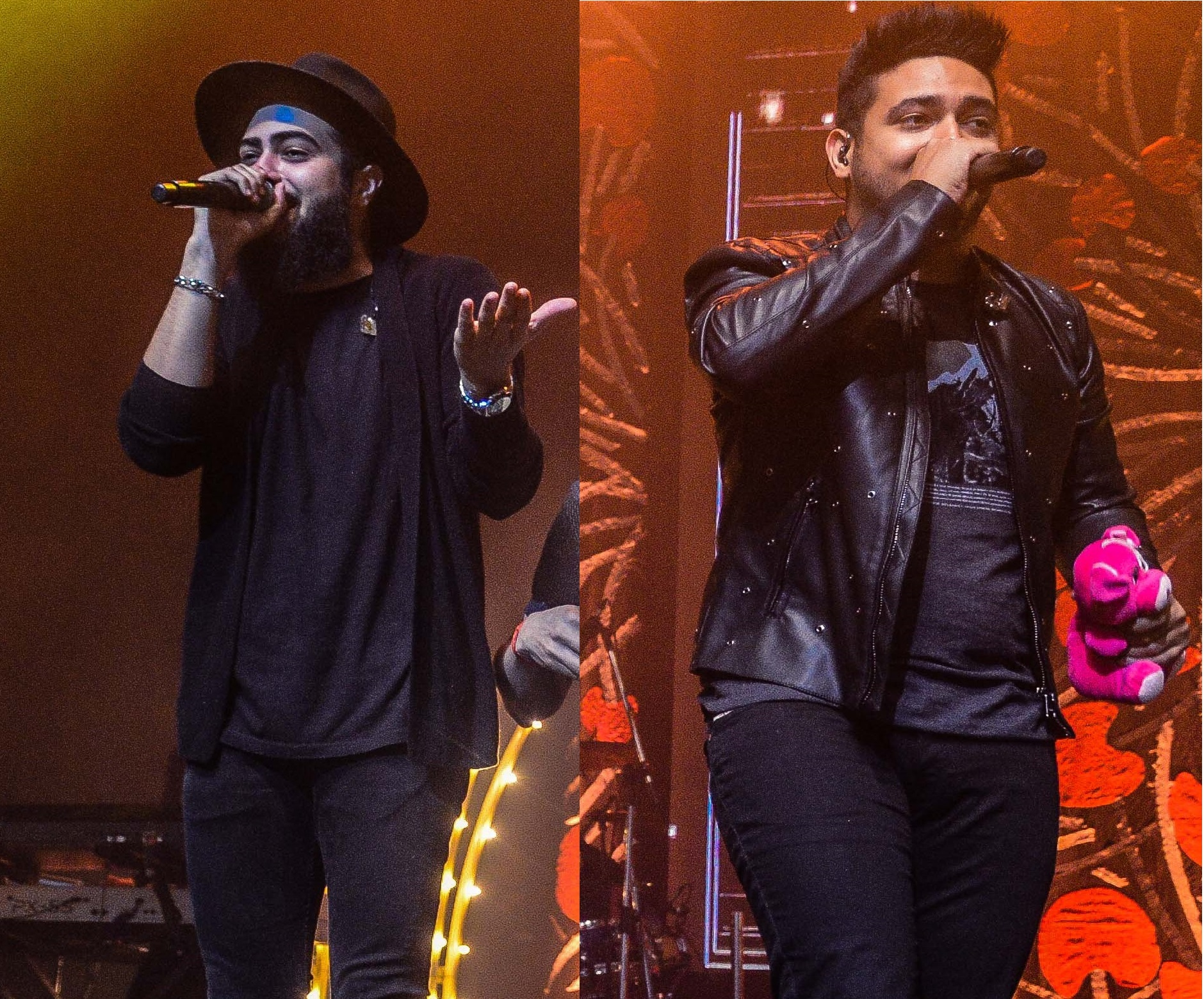

Background information
- Origin: Palmeirópolis, Tocantins, Brazil
- Genres: Música sertaneja
- Years active: 2008-present
- Label: Som Livre
- Members: Henrique; Juliano

Henrique & Juliano (sometimes written Henrique e Juliano) is a Brazilian sertanejo duo composed of brothers Ricelly Henrique Tavares Reis (born 23 May 1989) and Edson "Juliano" Alves dos Reis Junior (born 27 November 1990), both from Palmeirópolis, Tocantis.

Their single "Cuida Bem Dela" was number 1 for 8 weeks in the Brasil Hot 100 Airplay and has been accessed by over 220 million viewers on YouTube. They have been compared to other male sertanejo duos, Henrique & Diego and Jorge & Mateus.

== Discography ==
=== Albums ===
- 2011: Vem Curtir com a Gente – Independente – CD
- 2012: Henrique & Juliano - CD
- 2013: Ao Vivo em Palmas - Som Livre – CD/DVD
- 2014: Ao Vivo em Brasília – Som Livre – CD/DVD
- 2016: Novas Histórias - Som Livre – CD/DVD
- 2017: O Céu Explica Tudo - Som Livre – CD/DVD
- 2018: Menos é Mais - Som Livre – CD/DVD
- 2020: Ao Vivo no Ibirapuera - Som Livre – CD/DVD

=== Singles ===
Year	Title	Top position (BRA)	Album
2011	"Nasci Pra Te Amar"	—	Vem Curtir com a Gente
2012	"Vem Novinha"	58	Ao Vivo
2012	"Não Tô Valendo Nada" (with João Neto & Frederico)	22	Ao Vivo em Palmas
2013	"Mistura Louca" (with Os Hawaianos)	54	Ao Vivo em Palmas
2013	"Separa, Namora"	26	Ao Vivo em Palmas
2013	"Tá Namorando e Me Querendo"	24	Ao Vivo em Palmas
2014	"Recaídas"	15	Ao Vivo em Palmas
2014	"Até Você Voltar"	7	Ao Vivo em Brasília
2014	"Cuida Bem Dela"	1	Ao Vivo em Brasília
2015	"Mudando de Assunto"	2	Ao Vivo em Brasília
2015	"Na Hora da Raiva"	4	Novas Histórias
2016	"Como é Que a Gente Fica"	2	Novas Histórias
2016	"A Flor e o Beija-Flor" (part. Marília Mendonça)	15	Novas Histórias
2017	"Vidinha de Balada"	1	O Céu Explica Tudo
2017	"Aquela Pessoa"	1	O Céu Explica Tudo
2018	"Mais Amor e Menos Drama"	3	O Céu Explica Tudo
2018	"Quem Pegou, Pegou"	1	Menos é Mais
2019	"Cidade Vizinha"	6	Menos é Mais
2019	"Liberdade Provisória"	1	Ao Vivo no Ibirapuera

Collaborations

Year	Title	Top position	Album
Year	Title	BRA	Album
2014	"Bonde dos Solteiros" (with Fred & Gustavo)	21	Pra Ser Tudo Perfeito
2015	"Maior Que o Oceano" (with Thiago Brava)	—	Sempre Diferente
2015	"10 Minutos Longe de Você" (with Victor & Leo)	1	Irmãos
2015	"Acho Que Esqueci de Mim" (with Roberta Miranda)	72	Apenas Single
2015	"Colecionei" (with Zé Ricardo & Thiago)	21	Onde Tudo Começou
2015	"Impasse" (com Marília Mendonça)	—	Marília Mendonça - Ao Vivo
2016	"Deixa a Gente Quieto" (com João Bosco & Vinícius)	7	Céu de São Paulo
2016	"A Mala é Falsa" (com Felipe Araújo)	19	Felipe Araújo 1,2,3 Ao Vivo Em Goiânia
2017	"Deixa Eu Cantar" (com Eddy Britto & Samuel)	40	Apenas Single
2018	"O Alvo" (com Diego & Victor Hugo)	15	Sem Contraindicação - Ao Vivo
2018	"Teste da Mãozinha" (com Hugo & Guilherme)	18	No Pelo em Campo Grande
