= Maria Cecília & Rodolfo =

Duo performing sertanejo (Brazilian country music)

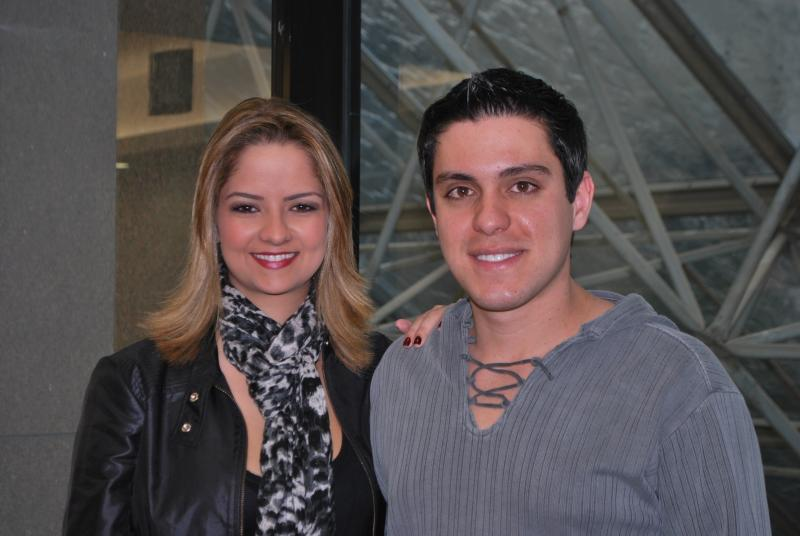
- Maria Cecília & Rodolfo during a news conference.

Background information
- Origin: Campo Grande, Mato Grosso do Sul, Brazil
- Genres: Sertanejo
- Occupation: Singer
- Labels: Universal Music Brazil
- Members: Maria Cecília Serenza Ferreira; Rodolfo Trelha Jacques de Carvalho
- Website: http://www.mariaceciliaerodolfo.com.br/2011/

Maria Cecília & Rodolfo are a Brazilian country music duo called Música sertaneja, formed by Maria Cecília Serenza Ferreira Alves and Rodolfo Trelha Jacques de Carvalho.

== History ==
Cecília and Rodolfo's partnership began in 2007 when they met at the University Don Bosco in Campo Grande, Mato Grosso do Sul. Both were enrolled in a Zootechnics course.

In 2008, with sponsorship from established artists Jorge & Mateus, they recorded their first promotional CD titled You Back.

The following year (2009), Cecília and Rodolfo achieved a significant milestone by releasing their second album, accompanied by their first DVD. The release, produced by Som Livre in Goiânia, marked a turning point in their career. Their melodic compositions and heartfelt performances resonated with audiences, propelling them to prominence within the Brazilian country music scene.

Recently, the duo recorded their latest effort—a CD recorded at Estoril Club, attended by guests from their fan clubs. Notably, on August 13 and 14, 2010, they performed live in São Paulo, capturing hits such as “Bye Bye” and “The Days Go.” On December 2, 2010, Maria Cecília e Rodolfo launched the new single from their CD/DVD, the song “The Payback,” featuring members of the samba group Exaltasamba.

In 2025, Maria Cecília and Rodolfo performed cosplayed as Catarina and Petruchio (characters from the 2000 Brazilian telenovela O Cravo e a Rosa) in the reality singing competition The Masked Singer Brasil.

== Discography ==
Albums

Title	Details	Sales
Ao Vivo 2008	Released: 2008; Label: Som Livre; Format: CD, download digital	BRA: 1,000,000
Ao Vivo Em Goiânia	Released: 2009; Label: Sony Music; Format: CD, download digital	BRA: 50,000
Ao Vivo Em São Paulo	Released: 2010; Label: Sony Music; Format: CD, download digital	BRA: 50,000
Com Você	Released: 2013; Label: Sony Music; Format: CD, download digital	BRA: 15,000
Espalhe Amor	Released: 2015; Label: Radar Records; Format: CD, download digital	
Em Fases	Released: 2016; Label: Universal Music; Format: CD, download digital	

Videography

Title	Details	Sales
Ao Vivo Em Goiânia	Released: 2009; Label: Sony Music; Format: DVD, download digital	BRA: 25,000
Ao Vivo Em São Paulo	Released: 2010; Label: Sony Music; Format: DVD, download digital	BRA: 25,000
Com Você	Released: 2013; Label: Sony Music; Format: DVD, download digital	BRA: 15,000
Em Fases	Released: 2016; Label: Universal Music; Format: DVD, download digital	

== Singles ==
Year	Title	Peak chart positions	Album
Year	Title	BRA	Album
2008	Você de Volta	1	Ao Vivo 2008
2009	Coisas Exotéricas	1	Ao Vivo 2008
2009	A Fila Andou	41	Ao Vivo 2008
2009	Quem Ama Cuida	49	Ao Vivo Em Goiânia
2010	Os Dias Vão	26	Ao Vivo em São Paulo
2010	Tchau Tchau	16	Ao Vivo em São Paulo
2011	O Troco (feat. Exaltasamba)	8	Ao Vivo em São Paulo
2011	Três Palavras	3	Ao Vivo em São Paulo
2012	Beijo Bom	37	Com Você
2013	Nunca Mais Me Deixe	40	Com Você
2013	Só de Pensar (feat. Jorge e Mateus)	91	Com Você
2013	Arrocha e Vem Comigo	—	Com Você
2014	Espalhe Amor	20	Espalhe Amor
2014	Todos os Dias	24	Espalhe Amor
2014	Deixa Eu Fazer Outra Vez	21	Espalhe Amor
2015	Noites Escuras	91	Espalhe Amor
2016	Depois da Briga	28	Em Fases
2017	Dói Só de Pensar	24	Em Fases
2017	Participação Especial	46	—N/a
