= Le Le Le =

Le Le Le may refer to:

- Lê Lê Lê, a song by Brazilian duo João Neto & Frederico
- "Le Le Le", B-side of the single release "Boom Bip", by Zion I
