= Alex Ferrari =

Alex Ferrari may refer to:

- Alex Ferrari (singer)
- Alex Ferrari (director)
- Alex Ferrari (footballer)
