= Leo Rodriguez (singer) =

Brazilian singer (born 1989)

- Born: February 10, 1989 (age 37); Descalvado, São Paulo, Brazil
- Genres: Sertanejo universitário, country
- Occupation: Singer
- Years active: 2009 – present
- Website: leorodriguez.com.br

Leo Rodriguez (born Leandro Augusto da Silva, February 10, 1989) is a Brazilian singer of sertanejo universitário most famous for his version of "Bara Bará Bere Berê" that charted in Belgium and Netherlands charts.

"Bara Bará Bere Berê" already popular in Brazil for a long time, was recorded by Rodriguez in February 2012 and released on Brazilian Sony label Sony Edições accompanied by a music video. His version contains additional lyrics in Portuguese co-written by Rodríguez himself with Silvio Rodrígues. His version was released in Europe on June 19, 2012 and has charted in the Netherlands simultaneously to Alex Ferrari version charting in France. The Rodríguez version was released on Spinnin label in the Netherlands making it to No. 61 on chart dated August 18, 2012.

Rodriguez had his first break in 2009, when he sang live alongside João Carreiro & Capataz in Maringá. He also released his own album titled Atmosfera.

== Discography ==
Albums
Year	Album	Track list
2011	Atmosfera	*"Vou salvar seu coração" (3:39): "Fantasma do passado" (3:19); "Atmosfera" (3:46); "Segredo" (3:13); "Sofri, chorei" (3:04); "Quem vai chorar? (3:23); "Meu anjo lindo" (3:26); "Poemas e versos" (3:13); "O cara certo" (3:34); "Não esqueço" (3:35); "Bombeou" (3:23); "Paparazzi" (2:48); "Minha história" (3:24); "Rio que naveguei" (3:19); "Náufrago" (3:28)
2011	Leo Rodriguez: Amor Pra Vida Inteira	
2013	Leo Rodriguez	

International singles
Year	Single	Peak position		Album
Year	Single	BEL (Vl)	NED	Album
2012	"Bara Bará Bere Berê"	22 (Ultratip)	56	Non-album release

Others
Year	Title
2013	"Vai de Cavalinho"

== Filmography ==
Television
Year	Title	Role
2013	Namoro com Leo Rodriguez	participant
2014	A Fazenda 7	participant
