= Bara Bará Bere Berê =

2008, 2012 Brazilian song

Song by Dorgival Dantas
- Released: 2008
- Label: Universal Music
- Songwriter: Dorgival Dantas

Bara Bará Bere Berê (Portuguese pronunciation: [baˈɾa baˈɾa beˈɾe beˈɾe], sometimes written with no diacritics as Bara Bara Bere Bere and sometimes reduced to Bara Bara or Bará Berê) is a popular Brazilian song in Portuguese. The refrain is a Bahian protect song created by Dorgival Dantas, with folk dance, rhythmic samba and merengue influences. The song has been subject to various interpretations by a great number of Brazilian artists, and various lyrics and additional music added to the original Dorgival Dantas version.

Before becoming a single in Brazil and internationally in 2012, "Bara Bara Bere Berê" had already been playing since 2008, in various shows and on Brazilian radio stations, with various sertanejo artist interpretations. Best-known versions include those by Aviões do Forró, Cristiano Araújo and Léo Rodriguez.

In Brazil, the first release as a digital single was that of Michel Teló. On 24 July 2012, Teló said in an interview with the television program Encontro com Fátima Bernardes that the launch was ready with new dance moves and would be available in Europe on 13 July 2012. The European releases included an EP with five different tracks of the song, the original radio version, another by Mister Jam and three by DJ Class.

The European and world charts have seen versions by Alex Ferrari in France, Belgium, Russia, Spain and Switzerland, by Leo Rodríguez in the Netherlands and the Dutch-language market in Belgium and a version by Michel Teló in Austria, Belgium, Germany, Spain and the Netherlands.

== Alex Ferrari version ==
"Bara Bará Bere Berê"

Single by Alex Ferrari
- Released: August 6, 2012
- Genre: Sertanejo, EDM, Electro house, Latin house, Dance
- Label: Kronika Records (Italy); EMI Music (France)
- Songwriters: Dorgival Dantas – Universal Music Publishing Brazil Ltda; Levi de Oliveira Silva (additional credits); Additional Production by Giulietto Kronika & DeeJay Trip
- Producers: Giulietto Kronika & DeeJay trip / Levi de Oliveira Silva

Alex Ferrari singles chronology
"Bara Bará Bere Berê" (2012)	"Guere Guerê" (2012)

Music video
- "Bara Bará Bere Berê" by Alex Ferrari on YouTube

The Brazilian singer Alex Ferrari registered it with Music Edition: Kronika Records and recorded it in June 2012 and interpreted it on many occasions in his home country. His version gained most popularity though on European night venues. As his version made rounds online, it was erroneously attributed at times to Michel Teló, although it was eventually proven as being a version recorded by Alex Ferrari himself.

The success of the song was brought about by the two Italian deejays Giulietto Kronika & DeeJay Trip, who signed a contract with Jeff Records and reached first place in the official French singles chart and climbed the charts throughout Europe with the versions created by the two DJs.

A studio version he produced was released in August 2012 by EMI Music France, having charted in France, where it peaked at #1 as at week-ended 19 August 2012, making Ferrari the third Brazilian act to top the French Singles Chart in 2012, after Michel Teló and Gusttavo Lima.

=== Formats ===
Single track list (digital)

- "Bara Bará Bere Berê" (3:42)

EP track list

- "Bara Bará Bere Berê" (Original Mix) – Alex Ferrari (3:42)
- "Bara Bará Bere Berê" (Giulietto Kronika & DeeJay Trip) – Alex Ferrari (3:55)
- "Bara Bará Bere Berê" (Rio de Janeiro) – Alex Ferrari (3:55)
- "Bara Bará Bere Berê" (Studio Acapella) – Alex Ferrari (3:55)

=== Charts ===
==== Weekly charts ====
Chart (2012)	Peak position
Belgium (Ultratop 50 Flanders)	15
Belgium (Ultratop 50 Wallonia)	2
Canada Hot 100 (Billboard)	78
France (SNEP)	1
Russia Airplay (TopHit)	11
Russia (2M)	1
Spain (PROMUSICAE)	11
Switzerland (Schweizer Hitparade)	7

==== Year-end charts ====
Chart (2012)	Position
Russia Airplay (TopHit)	87

== Leo Rodriguez version ==
"Bara Bará Bere Berê"

Single by Leo Rodriguez
- Released: July 2012 (Netherlands)
- Genre: Sertanejo, dance music
- Label: ARS / Universal (Belgium); Spinnin label (Netherlands)
- Songwriters: Dorgival Dantas – Universal Music Publishing Brazil Ltda; Silvio Rodrigues and Leo Rodriguez (additional lyrics)

Music video
- "Bara Bará Bere Berê" by Leo Rodríguez on YouTube

In addition to the hit version by Alex Ferrari, the version was performed by Leo Rodriguez, (sometimes with the diacritic as Leo Rodríguez) who recorded it in February 2012 and released it on Brazilian Sony label Sony Edições accompanied by a music video. His version contains additional lyrics in Portuguese co-written by Rodriguez with Silvio Rodrígues.

His version was released in Europe on 19 June 2012 and has charted in the Netherlands simultaneously to Alex Ferrari version charting in France. The Rodriguez version was released on Spinnin label in the Netherlands making it to #56 on chart dated 1 September 2012.

=== Charts ===
Chart (2012)	Peak position
Belgium (Ultratip Flanders)	22
Netherlands (Single Top 100)	56
Romania (Romanian Top 100)	35

== Michel Teló version ==
"Bara Bara / (Bara Bará Bere Berê)"

Single by Michel Teló

from the album Michel na Balada
- Released: 13 July 2012
- Genre: Sertanejo, dance music
- Label: Som Livre (Brazil); Universal (Austria); CNR (Netherlands)
- Songwriter: Dorgival Dantas – Universal Music Publishing Brazil Ltda
- Producer: Dudu Borges

Michel Teló singles chronology
"Eu te amo e Open Bar" (2011)	"Bara Bara / (Bara Bará Bere Berê)" (2012)	"Como Le Gusta A Tu Cuerpo" (2013)

Michel Teló International singles chronology
"Ai Se Eu Te Pego" (2011)	"Bara Bara" (2012)	"Como Le Gusta A Tu Cuerpo" (2013)

Music video
- "Bara Bará Bere Berê" by Michel Teló on YouTube

On 13 July 2012, the Brazilian artist Michel Teló also released his rendition of the song, entitled "Bara Bará Bere Berê" as a download. It was also sent to many Brazilian radio stations for airplay. The Teló version has also charted in the Netherlands, although the Leo Rodríguez version has proven more popular in the country. Teló's "Bara Bará" reached #60, whereas Leo Rodríguez version has reached #56.

The version with songwriting credits to Dorgival Dantas de Paiva was produced by Dudu Borges On 24 July 2012, Teló performed it live on Brazilian television variety show Encontro com Fátima Bernardes.

The version is also available in EP that contains five tracks of the song, including three mix versions by DJ Class, one mix version by Mister Jam and the radio version.

=== Formats ===
Single track list (digital)

- "Bara Bará Bere Berê" (2:45)

EP track list

- "Bará Bará Berê Berê" (a Class edit) – Michel Teló (2:45)
- "Bará Bará Berê Berê" – Michel Teló (2:45)
- "Bará Bará Berê Berê" (a Class floor mix) – Michel Telo (4:06)
- "Bará Bará Berê Berê" (a Class special radio mix) – Michel Teló (2:46)
- "Bará Bará Berê Berê" (Mister Jam summer remix) – Michel Teló (2:45)

=== Weekly charts ===
Weekly chart performance for "Bara Bara / (Bara Bará Bere Berê)"
Chart (2012)	Peak position
Austria (Ö3 Austria Top 40)	45
Belgium (Ultratop 50 Flanders)	42
Belgium (Ultratip Wallonia)	6
Germany (Official German Charts)	42
Italy (FIMI)	12
Netherlands (Single Top 100)	60
Poland Dance (ZPAV)	9
Romania (Romanian Top 100)	32
Russia (Tophit)	121
Spain (PROMUSICAE)	48

=== Year-end charts ===
Year-end chart performance for "Bara Bara / (Bara Bará Bere Berê)"
Chart (2012)	Rank
Italy (FIMI)	91

=== Certifications ===
Certifications for "Bara Bara / (Bara Bará Bere Berê)"
Region	Certification	Certified units/sales
Italy (FIMI)	Gold	15,000^{*}
^{*} Sales figures based on certification alone.

=== Release history ===
- Austria: Digital download (27 July 2012, Sony Music)
- Austria: Digital download of remix EP (10 August 2012, Sony Music)
- Germany: Digital download of remix EP (10 August 2012, Sony Music)
- Spain: Digital download (7 August 2012, Sony Music)
- Italy: Digital download (13 July 2012 Sony Music)
- Netherlands: Digital download (26 July 2012, CNR Music)
- Switzerland: Digital download (27 July 2012 Roster Music)

== Other versions ==
Puerto Rican reggaeton singer Don Omar and Lucenzo released Danza Kuduro which the song with same melody, but the song is not related to Bara Bara. The song was released in 2008 before This song which is released in 2010.

2011 and earlier
Prior to the Alex Ferrari / Leo Rodriguez / Michel Teló hit, the song had been performed by various Brazilian formations in the second half of 2000 (around 2007 onwards).

Versions from 2011 and prior period include those by Aviões do Forró, Lenno & Lincoln, Real de Ouro all as "Bara Bará Bere Berê", Zezinho Desmantelado do Forró as "Beré Bará" and Bagaceiros do Forró at Kabanas Hall as "Barabarababá Bereberebebê".

2012 versions
Based on the widespread popularity of the song, the song lived a revival with sertanejo-style arrangements of the tune. In addition to the European hit versions by Alex Ferrari, Leo Rodriguez and Michel Teló, it has been performed by various artists including very notably by Cristiano Araújo who reinterpreted the song in recording released on 10 May 2012 on "Som Livre" label as "Bara Berê" using tradition Bahia sound. He also sang it live accompanied by the famous sertanejo duo Bruno & Marrone.

Other 2012 versions include Marcos & Fernando with João Neto & Frederico interpreting it as "Bará Berê". This was released on Universal Music label.

2013 version
A version titled "Bará Berê" was produced by Bozzetto and recorded by Iciar Díaz, a female singer, showing a clear fusion of guitar with accordion, giving the song a new style.

Indonesian television variety show Yuk Keep Smile also uses the song for one of its dances.
