= Palmeirópolis =

Municipality in Tocantins, Brazil

Coordinates: 13°04′S 48°22′W

- Municipality
- Interactive map of Palmeirópolis
- Country: Brazil
- Region: North
- State: Tocantins
- Mesoregion: Ocidental do Tocantins

Population (2020)
  - Total: 7,676
- Time zone: UTC−3 (BRT)

Palmeirópolis is a municipality in Tocantins, North Region, Brazil.

== See also ==
- List of municipalities in Tocantins
