= A Nova Democracia =

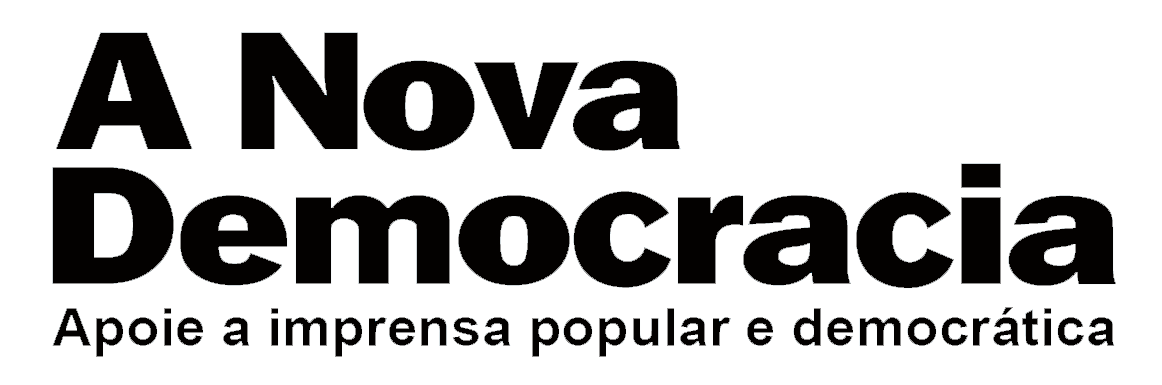

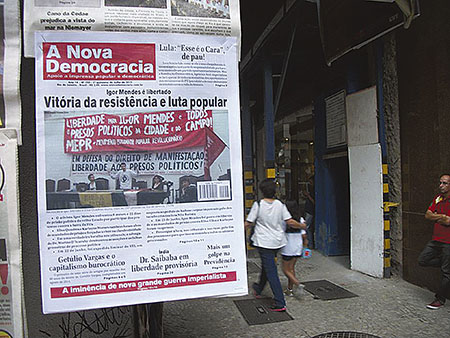
- A copy on a newsstand in the central region of Rio de Janeiro.
- Format: Tabloid
- Publisher: Editora Aimberê
- Editor-in-chief: Victor Costa
- Founded: July 2002
- Political alignment: Marxism-Leninism-Maoism; Internationalism; Anti-imperialism
- Language: Portuguese
- Headquarters: Rio de Janeiro
- Country: Brazil
- Website: anovademocracia.com.br

A Nova Democracia (lit. 'The New Democracy'), also known by its acronym AND, is a Brazilian political newspaper founded in July 2002, in the Copacabana neighborhood, in the city of Rio de Janeiro. It has a printed and bimonthly circulation throughout the country and, in its digital version, it functions as a portal for daily political news and analysis. Its editorial line proclaims itself as democratic, popular, national and anti-imperialist. Because it has no ties to political parties and takes a radical stance towards institutionality, A Nova Democracia is also strongly associated with the movement to boycott elections.

== Content ==
It has dozens of thematic sections among its versions sold at newsstands and available on the internet, among which the following stand out: Struggle for Land, Indigenous Peoples, New Culture, Latin America, National Liberation Struggles, Political Prisoners, People's War and Agrarian Revolution. The latter have made the newspaper the main reference for information on the revolutionary processes underway by communist parties in India, Turkey, Peru and the Philippines, especially among the political left. It is also known for widely publicizing the actions of the peasant movement of the League of Poor Peasants in areas of agrarian conflict, and for covering rights violations in protests and in state actions, such as military incursions into favelas, especially in Rio de Janeiro, where it has become a reference in cyberactivism.

It also has a vast media production over almost two decades of existence, having even acted in literary and film productions, including short and feature films.

== Incidents ==
In October 2019, the publication was listed as the organizer of an event at the Rio de Janeiro State University (UERJ) in which activists from social movements and intellectuals, including a representative of the League of Poor Peasants (LCP) and philosopher Vladimir Safatle, were said to have advocated a violent insurrection to confront the economic and political crisis in Brazil.

In August 2020, its headquarters, at the time in the São Cristóvão neighborhood, was targeted by a empastelamento along with two other periodicals from the left-wing political spectrum: the Ponte Jornalismo portal and the Diário da Causa Operária newspaper. While the latter two suffered virtual attacks, AND had part of its physical IT infrastructure destroyed.

In January 2025, A Nova Democracia reported that its YouTube channel had been terminated without any warnings for violating the platform's guidelines. The publication called for donations from its audience, as most of its income came from the YouTube channel.
