= Alex Ferrari (singer) =

Brazilian singer

- Born: Levi de Oliveira Silva; 21 April 1982 (age 44); Ariquemes, Rondônia, Brazil, Santa Catarina, Paranagua
- Genres: Sertanejo, electronic dance, latin pop
- Occupations: Singer, Songwriter, Composer, Producer
- Years active: 2011–present
- Website: www.alexferrari.com.br

Alex Ferrari is a Brazilian singer, songwriter and producer known for "Bara Bará Bere Berê" made famous by the two Italian deejays Giulietto Kronika & DeeJay Trip, which reached number one in the official French Singles Chart.

== Songwriting ==
Ferrari has also written a number of songs, notably "Gatinha assanhada" (co-written with Gabriel Valim) that became a hit for sertanejo singer Gusttavo Lima in Brazil, reaching the Brazilian Top 10. It also appears on Lima's 2012 live album Ao Vivo em São Paulo.

== Discography ==
Single track list (digital)

- "Bara Bará Bere Berê" (3:42)

EP track list

- "Bara Bará Bere Berê" (Original Mix) – Alex Ferrari (3:42)
- "Bara Bará Bere Berê" (Giulietto Kronika & DeeJay Trip) – Alex Ferrari (3:55)
- "Bara Bará Bere Berê" (Rio de Janeiro) – Alex Ferrari (3:55)
- "Bara Bará Bere Berê" (Studio Acapella) – Alex Ferrari (3:55)

=== Albums ===
| Year | Album | Peak positions | Certification |
| Year | Album | FRA | Certification |
|---|---|---|---|
| 2012 | Bará Berê: Released: 12 November 2012 (France); Record label: | 191 | |

=== International singles ===
| Year | Single | Peak positions | | | | | | Certification | Album |
| Year | Single | BEL (Fl) | BEL (Wa) | CAN | FRA | SPA | SWI | Certification | Album |
|---|---|---|---|---|---|---|---|---|---|
| 2012 | "Bara Bará Bere Berê" | 15 | 2 | 78 | 1 | 11 | 7 | | Non-album release Later appeared in Bara Bere |
| 2012 | "Guere Guerê" | – | – | – | 175 | – | – | | Bara Bere |
