= Ídolos Brazil season 2 =

Ídolos Brazil
- Season 2
- Hosted by: Beto Marden; Lígia Mendes
- Judges: Carlos Eduardo Miranda; Arnaldo Saccomani; Cyz Zamorano; Thomas Roth
- Winner: Thaeme Mariôto
- Runner-up: Shirley Carvalho
- Finals venue: Anhanguera TV Center

Release
- Original network: SBT
- Original release: March 28 – August 16, 2007

Season chronology
- ← Previous; Season 1 Next → Season 3

Ídolos Brazil 2 (known as Ídolos 2007) was the second season of Brazilian reality interactive talent show Ídolos (and last aired on SBT), which premiered on March 28, 2007 with the season finale airing on August 16, 2007.

Beto Marden and Lígia Mendes returned as hosts from last year and the judging panel again consists of Carlos Eduardo Miranda, Arnaldo Saccomani, Cyz Zamorano and Thomas Roth.

Thaeme Mariôto won the competition with Shirley Carvalho as the first runner-up and Lenny Bellard finishing third.

== Early Process ==
=== Regional Auditions ===
Auditions were held in the following cities:

| Episode Air Date | Audition City | Audition Date | Audition Venue |
|---|---|---|---|
| Mar 28, 2007 | Salvador | Oct 14, 2006 | Bahia Othon Palace Hotel |
| Mar 29, 2007 | Salvador | Oct 14, 2006 | Bahia Othon Palace Hotel |
| Apr 04, 2007 | Belo Horizonte | Nov 04, 2006 | Mercure Lourdes Hotel |
| Apr 05, 2007 | Belo Horizonte | Nov 04, 2006 | Mercure Lourdes Hotel |
| Apr 11, 2007 | Belém | Oct 21, 2006 | Golden Palace Events |
| Apr 12, 2007 | Belém | Oct 21, 2006 | Golden Palace Events |
| Apr 18, 2007 | Campinas | Nov 11, 2006 | Campinas Tenis Club |
| Apr 19, 2007 | Campinas | Nov 11, 2006 | Campinas Tenis Club |
| Apr 25, 2007 | Florianópolis | Nov 18, 2006 | Centrosul |
| Apr 26, 2007 | Florianópolis | Nov 18, 2006 | Centrosul |

== Theater Round ==
=== First Cut ===
The first day of Theater Week featured the one hundred eighty-three contestants from the auditions round. One hundred and eight contestants advanced.

=== Chorus Line ===
Divided into groups, each contestant should go on stage and sing a song a capella for the judges until they stopped them. Seventy-four advanced.

=== Solos ===
The next round required the contestants singing solo with the option of playing an instrument. Fifty advanced to the final round. In the end, the judges take the contestants in pairs and tell them if they made the final thirty-two.

== Semi-finals ==
The thirty-two semifinalists were split by gender into four groups. Each contestant would then sing in their respective group's night. The top three contestants from each group made it to the finals. The girls' groups performed on May 16, 2007 and May 30, 2007, while the guys' groups performed on May 23, 2007 and June 6, 2007, with results show on the following night.

== Finals ==
=== Finalists ===
| Contestant | Age | Hometown | Audition Location | Voted Off |
|---|---|---|---|---|
| Thaeme Mariôto | 21 | Presidente Prudente | Florianópolis | Winner |
| Shirley Carvalho | 30 | São José dos Campos | Campinas | Aug 16, 2009 |
| Lenny Bellard | 27 | Belém | Belém | Aug 09, 2007 |
| Tiago Faria | 18 | Canoinhas | Florianópolis | Aug 02, 2007 |
| Davi Lins | 19 | Rio de Janeiro | Belo Horizonte | Jul 26, 2007 |
| Naiara Terra | 18 | São Gonçalo | Belo Horizonte | Jul 19, 2007 |
| Karine Rodrigues | 25 | Alvorada | Florianópolis | Jul 12, 2007 |
| Dan Barros | 28 | Taubaté | Campinas | Jul 5, 2007 |
| Isaque Galvão | 26 | Natal | Campinas | Jun 28, 2007 |
| João Callaça | 29 | Uberlândia | Belo Horizonte | Jun 21, 2007 |
| Dani Black | 24 | São Paulo | Campinas | Jun 14, 2007 |
| Julio JL | 21 | Rio de Janeiro | Belo Horizonte | Jun 14, 2007 |

== Elimination chart ==
Legend
| Did Not Perform | Female | Male | Top 32 | Top 12 | Winner |

| Safe | Safe First | Safe Last | Eliminated |

| Stage: | | Semi-Finals | | | | Finals | | | | | | | | | |
| Stage: | | Top 32 | | | | Top 12 | Top 10 | Top 9 | Top 8 | Top 7 | Top 6 | Top 5 | Top 4 | Top 3 | Top 2 |
| Week: | | 5/17 | 5/24 | 5/31 | 6/7 | 6/14 (Note: The June 14 results show featured a double elimination: both the male and female contestants with the fewest votes were eliminated. Julio JL was eliminated first.) | 6/21 | 6/28 | 7/5 | 7/12 | 7/19 | 7/26 | 8/2 | 8/9 | 8/16 |
| Place | Contestant | Result | | | | | | | | | | | | | |
| 1 | Thaeme Mariôto | N/A | N/A | Top 12 | N/A | Bottom 2 (F) | Safe | Safe | Safe | Safe | Bottom 2 | Safe | Safe | Safe | Winner |
| 2 | Shirley Carvalho | N/A | N/A | Top 12 | N/A | Safe | Safe | Safe | Bottom 2 | Safe | Safe | Safe | Safe | Safe | Runner-up |
| 3 | Lenny Bellard | N/A | N/A | Top 12 | N/A | Safe | Safe | Safe | Bottom 3 | Bottom 3 | Safe | Bottom 2 | Bottom 2 | Elim | |
| 4 | Tiago Faria | N/A | Top 12 | N/A | N/A | Safe | Safe | Safe | Safe | Safe | Bottom 3 | Safe | Elim | | |
| 5 | Davi Lins | N/A | Top 12 | N/A | N/A | Safe | Safe | Safe | Safe | Safe | Safe | Elim | | | |
| 6 | Naiara Terra | Top 12 | N/A | N/A | N/A | Safe | Safe | Safe | Safe | Bottom 2 | Elim | | | | |
| 7 | Karine Rodrigues | Top 12 | N/A | N/A | N/A | Safe | Safe | Bottom 3 | Safe | Elim | | | | | |
| 8 | Dan Barros | N/A | Top 12 | N/A | N/A | Safe | Bottom 2 | Bottom 2 | Elim | | | | | | |
| 9 | Isaque Galvão | N/A | N/A | N/A | Top 12 | Bottom 2 (M) | Bottom 3 | Elim | | | | | | | |
| 10 | João Callaça | N/A | N/A | N/A | Top 12 | Safe | Elim | | | | | | | | |
| 11–12 | Dani Black | Top 12 | N/A | N/A | N/A | Elim | | | | | | | | | |
| 11–12 | Julio JL | N/A | N/A | N/A | Top 12 | Elim | | | | | | | | | |
| Semi- Final 4 | Humberto Diniz | N/A | N/A | N/A | Elim | | | | | | | | | | |
| Semi- Final 4 | Leo Castro | N/A | N/A | N/A | Elim | | | | | | | | | | |
| Semi- Final 4 | Mateus Mantovani | N/A | N/A | N/A | Elim | | | | | | | | | | |
| Semi- Final 4 | Mello Júnior | N/A | N/A | N/A | Elim | | | | | | | | | | |
| Semi- Final 4 | Thiago Pity | N/A | N/A | N/A | Elim | | | | | | | | | | |
| Semi- Final 3 | Bárbara Amorim | N/A | N/A | Elim | | | | | | | | | | | |
| Semi- Final 3 | Dany Vega | N/A | N/A | Elim | | | | | | | | | | | |
| Semi- Final 3 | Gisele Midian | N/A | N/A | Elim | | | | | | | | | | | |
| Semi- Final 3 | Julie Philippe | N/A | N/A | Elim | | | | | | | | | | | |
| Semi- Final 3 | Mari Rocha | N/A | N/A | Elim | | | | | | | | | | | |
| Semi- Final 2 | Daniel Murata | N/A | Elim | | | | | | | | | | | | |
| Semi- Final 2 | Diego Valim | N/A | Elim | | | | | | | | | | | | |
| Semi- Final 2 | Jésus Henrique | N/A | Elim | | | | | | | | | | | | |
| Semi- Final 2 | Rafael Chaves | N/A | Elim | | | | | | | | | | | | |
| Semi- Final 2 | Thiago Soares | N/A | Elim | | | | | | | | | | | | |
| Semi- Final 1 | Fabiana Belz | Elim | | | | | | | | | | | | | |
| Semi- Final 1 | Keyla Vilaça | Elim | | | | | | | | | | | | | |
| Semi- Final 1 | Leila Lins | Elim | | | | | | | | | | | | | |
| Semi- Final 1 | Luzielle Carvalho | Elim | | | | | | | | | | | | | |
| Semi- Final 1 | Suelen Rocha | Elim | | | | | | | | | | | | | |
