= Lê Lê Lê =

Single by João Neto & Frederico

from the album Ao Vivo em Palmas
- Released: 2011 (Brazil and Latin markets); May 2014 (Europe)
- Recorded: 2012
- Genre: Música sertaneja (universitário)
- Length: 2:39 (Radio edit)
- Label: Som Livre (Brazil); BIP (Netherlands, Belgium)
- Songwriters: Raynner Sousa; Anderson Oliveira Barony; Junior Sergio Mendes De Souza (Adriann Mendes)

João Neto & Frederico (Brazil) singles chronology
"Tá Combinado" (2011)	"Lê Lê Lê" (2011)	"Tô Morando Sozinho" (2012)

João Neto & Frederico (international) singles chronology
"Lê Lê Lê" (2014)

Music video
- "Lê Lê Lê" (live) on YouTube

"Lê Lê Lê" is a 2011 song by Brazilian sertanejo duo João Neto & Frederico. It was a pre-release from their 2012 live album and DVD Ao Vivo em Palmas(Live from Palmas). Already their biggest hit for them in Brazil and Latin markets in 2011, it gained big popularity on European dance charts in 2012, including in Spain, Portugal, France, Netherlands, UK.

It was re-released by BIP Records in May 2014 for major European markets charting in the Netherlands and Belgium.

== Appearances ==
Besides the live album Ao Vivo em Palmas, "Lê Lê Lê" has appeared in a great number of Latin-inspired dance compilations including:

2012

- Été 2012 (Smart)
- Ritmo latino [2012] (Polystar)
- Hot Latina 2012 (EMI)
- ¡Tacatá! The Latin Hits 2012 Vol. 2 (Universal)

2013

- Zumba Fitness – Dance Party 2 (Universal)
- The Dome Vol. 65 (Polystar)
- Let's Dance – Das Tanzalbum 2013 (Polystar)
- Clubfete 2013.02 (Ballhaus)
- Die Hit-Giganten – Best of Sommerhits (Sony)

2014

- RTL II präsentiert: Ritmo do Brasil (Polystar)
- MNM Big Hits 2014 Vol. 2 (Warner)
- Hitzone 10 (Sony)

== Track list ==
Europe

1. "Lê Lê Lê" (radio edit) (2:39) – (BIP / BIP-Club-644)

== In popular culture ==
"Lê Lê Lê" was used as a theme song for the telenovela series Cheias de Charme in 2012.

== Charts ==
=== Weekly charts ===
Chart (2014)	Peak position
Belgium (Ultratop 50 Flanders)	9
Belgium (Ultratip Bubbling Under Wallonia)	16
Netherlands (Single Top 100)	47

=== Year-end charts ===
Chart (2014)	Position
Belgium (Ultratop Flanders)	87
