= Simone & Simaria =

Brazilian musical duo

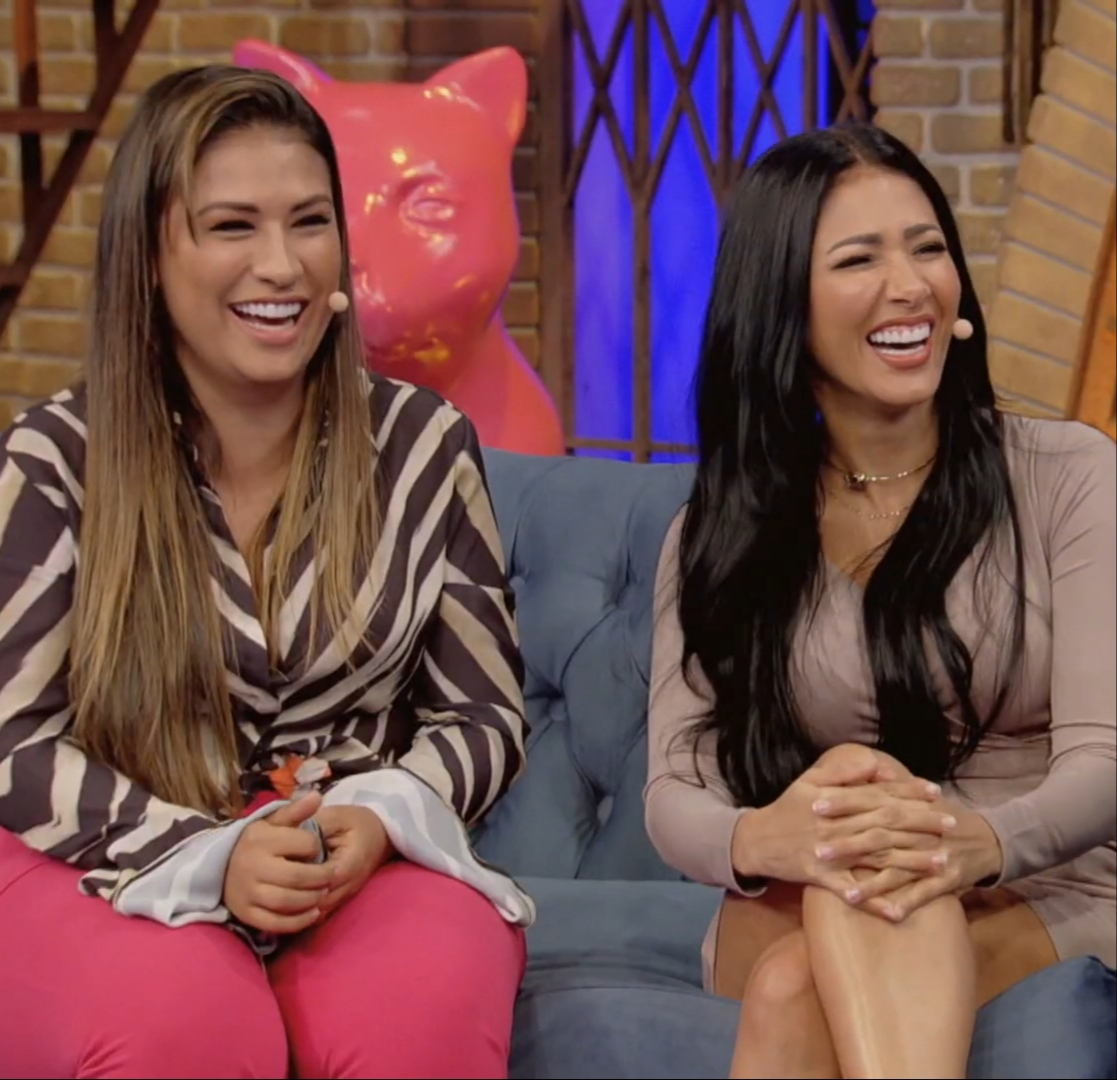

Background information
- Also known as: Coleguinhas, Brazilian Kardashians
- Origin: Uibaí, Bahia, Brazil
- Genres: Forró; sertanejo; Latin pop; reggaeton; Arrocha
- Years active: 2004; 2012–2022
- Labels: Atração Fonográfica (2004); Social Music (2012–14); Universal (2015–presente)
- Members: Simone Mendes; Simaria Mendes

Simone & Simaria (sometimes written as Simone e Simaria) was a Brazilian musical duo consisting of sisters Simone Mendes Rocha Diniz (born 24 May 1984 in Uibaí) and Simaria Mendes Rocha Escrig (born 16 June 1982 in Uibaí). In 2017, the duo's album competed in the category Latin Grammy Award for Best Sertaneja Music Album.

The duo released "Paga de Solteiro Feliz" (transl. "He Pretends He's Happy Single") on January 5, 2018, a song featuring the Brazilian DJ Alok. It was produced by Alok exploring the mix of sertanejo, principal genre of Simone & Simaria, with electronic music, genre of Alok. It peaked in Billboard Brasil Hot 100 at number 12.

== Discography ==
=== Studio albums ===
- Nã, Nã, Nim Na Não (2004)
- As Coleguinhas - Vol. 1 (2012)
- As Coleguinhas - Vol. 2 (2013)
- As Coleguinhas - Vol. 3 (2014)
- As Coleguinhas - Vol. 4 (2015)

=== Live albums ===
- Ao Vivo em Manaus (2013)
- Bar das Coleguinhas (2015)
- Live (2016)
- Aperte o Play (2019)
- Bar das Coleguinhas 2 (2022)
