= Loka (song) =

Single by Simone & Simaria featuring Anitta
- Released: 6 January 2017
- Recorded: December 2016
- Genre: Pop; Sertanejo; Reggaeton
- Length: 3:36
- Label: Universal Music International; S&S Gravações
- Songwriter(s): Rafinha RSQ; Kayky Ventura; Simone & Simaria
- Producer(s): Claudio Rezende

Simone & Simaria singles chronology
"Duvido Você Não Tomar Uma" (2016)	"Loka" (2017)	"Embaçar o Vidro" (2017)

Anitta singles chronology
"Sí O No" (2016)	"Loka" (2017)	"Você Partiu Meu Coração" (2017)

Music video
- "Loka" on YouTube

"Loka" is a song that served as a duet between Brazilian sertanejo duo Simone & Simaria and Brazilian singer-songwriter Anitta. "Loka" was released on January 6, 2017, through the Universal Music label.

== Production ==
Simone & Simaria wrote the song with Rafinha RSQ and Kayky Ventura.

=== Development ===
"Loka" arrived for the duo just before the recording of the video album Live (2016). Simone wanted to record the song immediately, but Simaria had another idea in mind, coming to reveal the name of Anitta to share the vocals. Simone and Simaria had previously met Anitta backstage at a Harmonia do Samba show, and some time later Anitta invited them to her birthday and they exchanged phones. After that, they are always talking to each other.

== Music video ==
The music video for the song was released on January 6, 2017, directed by Anselmo Troncoso and features Peter Hermann. The video was released on TVZ on January 6, 2017 and published shortly after on the Vevo platform. It features a studio of lights and a scrap iron. Troncoso's script follows Simone & Simaria and Anitta in a setting with lights and fire.

=== Reception ===
"Loka" was the most watched Brazilian music video on the Vevo platform in 2017 and also the most-viewed female Brazilian music video and the 10th most-viewed female music video in 2017, in addition to being the most popular clip featuring a Brazilian female lead in YouTube history, with more than half a billion views, and the second overall (in November 2017) behind only the song "Bum Bum Tam Tam" by MC Fioti.

== Track listing ==
Digital download
No.	Title	Length
1.	"Loka (featuring Anitta)"	3:35

== Charts ==
Chart (2017)	Peak position
Brazil (Billboard Brasil Hot 100 Airplay)	6
Brazil (Billboard Ranking iTunes Brasil)	6

=== Year-end charts ===
Chart (2017)	Position
Brazil (Pro-Música Brasil)	11

== Certifications ==
Region	Certification	Certified units/sales
Brazil (Pro-Música Brasil)	3× Diamond	750,000^{*}
^{*} Sales figures based on certification alone.
