= Uibaí =

- Municipality
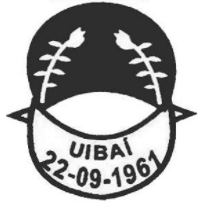
- Flag Coat of arms

- Location in Brazil
- Coordinates: 11°20′13″S 42°07′58″W
- Country: Brazil
- Region: Nordeste
- State: Bahia
- Mesoregion: Centro Norte Baiano

Government
  - Type: Prefecture

Area
  - Total: 212.740 sq mi (550.994 km^{2})

Population (2020)
  - Total: 13,891
  - Density: 6,410/sq mi (2,473/km^{2})
- Time zone: UTC−3 (BRT)
- Website: http://www.uibai.ba.gov.br/

Uibaí is a municipality in the state of Bahia in the North-East region of Brazil. It is located about 508 kilometres (316 mi) byroad northwest of Salvador. It lies to the northeast of Gentio do Ouro and about 30 kilometres (19 mi) south-southwest of Irecê, the nearest city. Xique-Xique and the São Francisco River is to the northwest.

A rural area, population growth has been slow; in 1950 it had a population of 11,890, and as of 2020 it had a population of 13,891 people.

== See also ==
- List of municipalities in Bahia
