= João Neto & Frederico =

Brazilian sertanejo duo

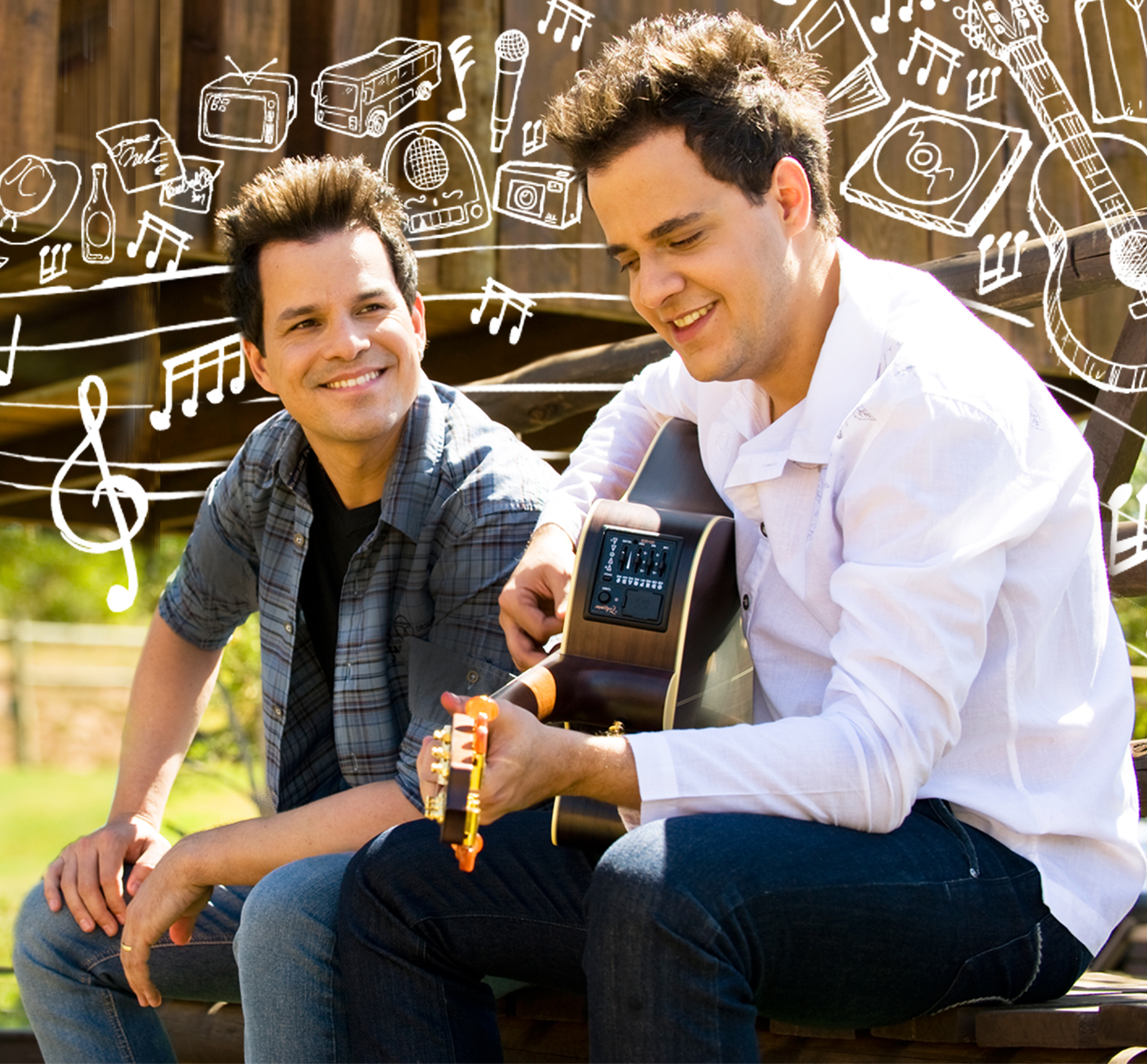
- João Neto and Frederico in 2010.

Background information
- Born: August 12, 1979 (age 46) (João Neto) March 11, 1982 (age 43) (Frederico)
- Origin: Goiânia, Goiás, Brazil
- Genres: sertanejo universitário
- Occupation: singer
- Labels: Universal Music Brazil
- Website: http://www.joaonetoefrederico.com.br/

João Neto & Frederico are a pair of sertanejo universitário singers formed by Brazilian João Neto Nunes (Goiânia, August 12, 1979) and Frederico Augusto Silva Nunes (Goiânia, March 11, 1982).

== Discography ==
=== Albums ===
- 2004 – Se Não Foi por Amor [CD]
- 2006 – Modão – Ao Vivo [CD]
- 2007 – Acústico Ao Vivo [CD e DVD]
- 2008 – Ao Vivo [CD e DVD]
- 2009 – Vale a Pena Sonhar [CD e DVD]
- 2010 – Só Modão – Ao Vivo [CD e DVD]
- 2011 – Tá Combinado [CD]
- 2012 – Ao Vivo em Palmas [CD e DVD]
- 2013 – Indecifrável [CD]

=== Singles ===
(International charting positions)

Year	Single	Peak positions			Album
Year	Single	BEL (Vl)	BEL (Wa)	NED Single 100	Album
2012/ 2014	"Lê Lê Lê"	9	16* (Ultratip)	47	Ao Vivo em Palmas

*Did not appear in the official Belgian Ultratop 50 charts, but rather in the bubbling under Ultratip charts.
