= Fernando & Sorocaba =

Brazilian musical duo

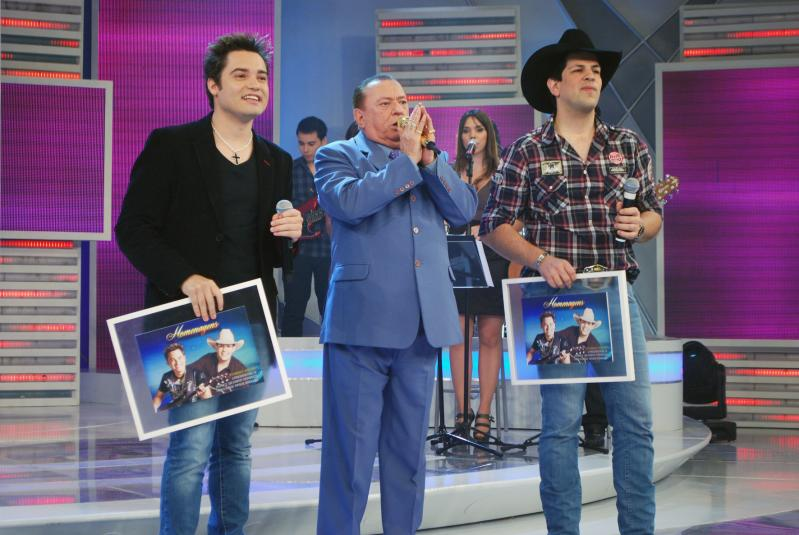
- Fernando e Sorocaba received on a TV show presented by Raul Gil (2011)

Background information
- Origin: Londrina, Paraná
- Genres: Sertanejo, country
- Labels: Universal Music (2008–2010); Som Livre (2010–14); FS Produções Artísticas (2014–present); Sony Music (2017–present)
- Members: Fernando Zorzanello Bonifácio (Fernando); Fernando Fakri de Assis (Sorocaba)
- Website: www.fernandoesorocaba.com.br

Fernando & Sorocaba are a sertanejo duo from Brazil.

== Members ==
- Fernando, full name Fernando Zorzanello Bonifácio, sometimes known as Fernando Zor (born April 21, 1984, in Ji-Paraná, Brazil). Fernando began singing when he was living in Cuiabá, where he moved at the age of 15.
- Sorocaba, stage name of Fernando Fakri de Assis (born September 15, 1980, in São Paulo, Brazil). Sorocaba began when he was studying agronomy, in Londrina. He earned the nickname Sorocaba because he was raised in the city of Sorocaba, a municipality in the state of São Paulo, Brazil.

== Discography ==
=== Albums ===
Studio albums

- 2013: Homens e Anjos (Men & Angels)
- 2016: FS Studio Sessions Vol. 1
- 2016: FS Studio Sessions Vol. 2
- 2024: Nash

Live albums

- 2006: Ao Vivo em Londrina (Live in Londrina)
- 2008: Bala de Prata (Silver Bullet)
- 2009: Vendaval (Hurricane)
- 2010: Acústico (Unplugged)
- 2011: Bola de Cristal (Crystal Ball)
- 2012: Acústico na Ópera de Arame (Unplugged at Wire Opera House)
- 2014: Sinta Essa Experiência (Feel This Experience)
- 2015: Anjo de Cabelos Longos (Long Haired Angel)
- 2017: Sou do Interior (I'm form backcountry)
- 2018: O Chamado da Floresta (The Call of the Forest)
- 2019: Isso é Churrasco (This is Barbecue)
- 2020: Antigas do Fernando & Sorocaba (Oldies of Fernando & Sorocaba)
- 2021: A Uma música De Distância (One Song Away)
- 2023: On Fire
- 2024: Na Pescaria (At Fishing)

=== EPs ===
- 2014: Sem Reação (FS Produções)

=== DVDs ===
- 2006: Ao Vivo em Londrina
- 2008: Bala de Prata - Ao Vivo
- 2010: Acústico
- 2011: Bola de Cristal - Ao Vivo
- 2012: Acústico na Ópera de Arame
- 2014: Sinta Essa Experiência
- 2015: Anjo de Cabelos Longos
- 2017: Sou do Interior
- 2018: O Chamado da Floresta
- 2019: Isso é Churrasco
- 2020: Antigas do Fernando & Sorocaba
- 2021: A Uma música De Distância
- 2023: On Fire
- 2024: Na Pescaria

=== Singles ===
| Year | Title | Peak position | Album |
|---|---|---|---|
| 2008 | "Bala de Prata" | 11 | Bala de Prata - Ao Vivo |
| 2009 | "Vendaval" | 64 | Vendaval - Ao Vivo |
| 2009 | "Paga Pau" | 3 | Vendaval - Ao Vivo |
| 2009 | "Da Cor do Pecado" | 34 | Vendaval - Ao Vivo |
| 2010 | "A Casa Caiu" | 31 | Acústico |
| 2010 | "Madri" | 2 | Acústico |
| 2010 | "Tô Passando Mal" | 19 | Bola de Cristal - Ao Vivo |
| 2011 | "Teus Segredos" | 11 | Bola de Cristal - Ao Vivo |
| 2011 | "Pega Eu" | 10 | Acústico na Ópera de Arame |
| 2011 | "Férias em Salvador" | 2 | Acústico na Ópera de Arame |
| 2012 | "É Tenso" | 2 | Acústico na Ópera de Arame |
| 2012 | "A Verdade" | 2 | Acústico na Ópera de Arame |
| 2012 | "As Mina Pira" | 66 | Homens e Anjos |
| 2012 | "Livre" | 16 | Homens e Anjos |
| 2013 | "Veneno" | 5 | Homens e Anjos |
| 2013 | "O Que Cê Vai Fazer" | 12 | Homens e Anjos |
| 2013 | "Mô" | 4 | Homens e Anjos |
| 2013 | "Gaveta" | 8 | Sinta Essa Experiência |
| 2014 | "Deixa Falar" | 29 | Sinta Essa Experiência |
| 2014 | "Mármore" | 4 | Non-album release |
| 2014 | "Bobeia Pra Ver" | 3 | Non-album release |
| 2015 | "Previsão do Tempo" | 10 | Anjo de Cabelos Longos |
| 2015 | "Dia Dez" | 12 | Non-album release |
| 2015 | "Anjo de Cabelos Longos" | 9 | Anjo de Cabelos Longos |
| 2016 | "Rolo e Confusão" | 10 | FS Studio Sessions Vol. 1 |
| 2016 | "Casa Branca" | 5 | FS Studio Sessions Vol. 1 |
| 2016 | "Notícia Boa" | 18 | FS Studio Sessions Vol. 2 |
| 2017 | "Luzes de São Paulo" | 21 | Sou do Interior - Ao Vivo |
| 2017 | "Terapinga (Terapia)" | 12 | Sou do Interior - Ao Vivo |
