= Sertanejo music =

Music genre that had its origins in the countryside of Brazil in the 1920s

Sertanejo
- Stylistic origins: Caipira; country
- Typical instruments: Classic guitar, electric guitar, viola caipira, accordion, violin, keyboards, drum set, percussion instruments

Subgenres
- Romantic sertanejo; Sertanejo Universitário; Funknejo; Agronejo; Pagonejo; Trapnejo

Sertanejo music (Brazilian Portuguese pronunciation: [seʁ.taˈne.ʒu]) is a term used to refer to a musical style of Brazil. For some, it is the folk music of São Paulo, which emerged during the Brazilian colonial period, and popularized in the 1920s, while others argue that it is a variation or urbanization of Caipira music, which is integrated into Caipira culture.

Sertanejo is the most popular genre in the country, particularly throughout Southern, Southeastern, and Center-western. Since the 1990s, is the most played music genre on Brazilian radio, constantly topping the Brazilian music charts. Additionally, from 2000 to 2003 and since 2009, sertaneja music albums have been granted a specific category at the Latin Grammy Awards. Many sertanejo artists are duos, at times formed by siblings, typically singing vocal harmonies, especially major thirds, and employing frequent vibrato. Men have traditionally dominated the scene, although some women such as Paula Fernandes, and Maria Cecília, and Simone & Simaria have achieved mainstream success in the 21st century. A subgenre, called "sertanejo universitário" (college sertanejo), has developed from the mid-2000s on, consisting of a more stripped-down, acoustic-oriented use of the guitars influenced by Western pop music. It has grown very popular among Brazilian youth nationwide and has dominated the sertanejo scene.

== Background ==
"Sertanejo" is derived from sertão, a general term for rural backlands away from coastal metropolitan regions, although sertão itself is also often used in a narrow sense referring to the interior away from the Brazilian Northeast. The Sertanejo people, from the Northeast of Brazil, are different in several aspects when compared to the Caipira people, who originate from São Paulo, being two distinct Brazilian cultures.

== History ==
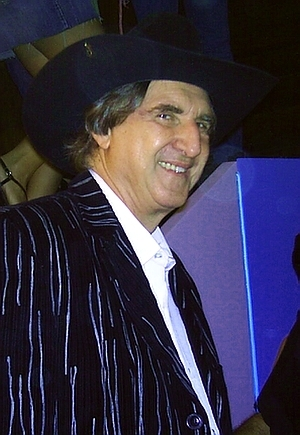
Sérgio Reis, one of the most successful sertanejo musicians in Brazil

Sertanejo music is a subgenre of Caipira music, recorded for the first time, based on recordings made by the journalist and writer Cornélio Pires, in 1929. The introduction of the electric guitar and pop music influences by duo Leo Canhoto e Robertinho in the late 1960s marked the start of Sertanejo music, separating it from Caipira music. One member of the Jovem Guarda musical movement, singer Sergio Reis switched from pop to sertanejo in the 1970, which contributed to a wider acceptance of the genre. At that time, sertanejo music was usually performed in circuses, rodeos, and AM radio stations. Early as the 1980s, this penetration extended to FM radio and also on television – either in weekly programs on Sunday morning or even making it into soap operas soundtracks or special one-off TV programs.

During the 1980s, there was a mass commercial exploitation of sertanejo, coupled in some cases, to a rereading of international hits and even the Jovem Guarda's. In this new romantic trend of country music countless artists emerged, almost always in pairs, among which, Trio Parada Dura, Chitãozinho & Xororó, Leandro e Leonardo, Zeze Di Camargo e Luciano, Chrystian & Ralf, João Paulo & Daniel, Chico Rey & Parana, João Mineiro and Marciano, Gian and Giovani, Rick & Renner, Gilberto e Gilmar, Alan e Aladim, along with some female singers, such as Roberta Miranda, Aula Miranda and Nalva Aguiar. Some of the successes of this phase are "Fio de Cabelo", by Marciano and Darci Rossi, "Apartmento 37 ", Leo Canhoto, "Pense em Mim, " Douglas in May, "Entre Tapas e Beijos", Nilton Lamas and Antonio Bueno and "Evidências", by Jose Augusto and Paulo Sérgio Valle.

== Subgenres ==
=== Sertanejo universitário ===
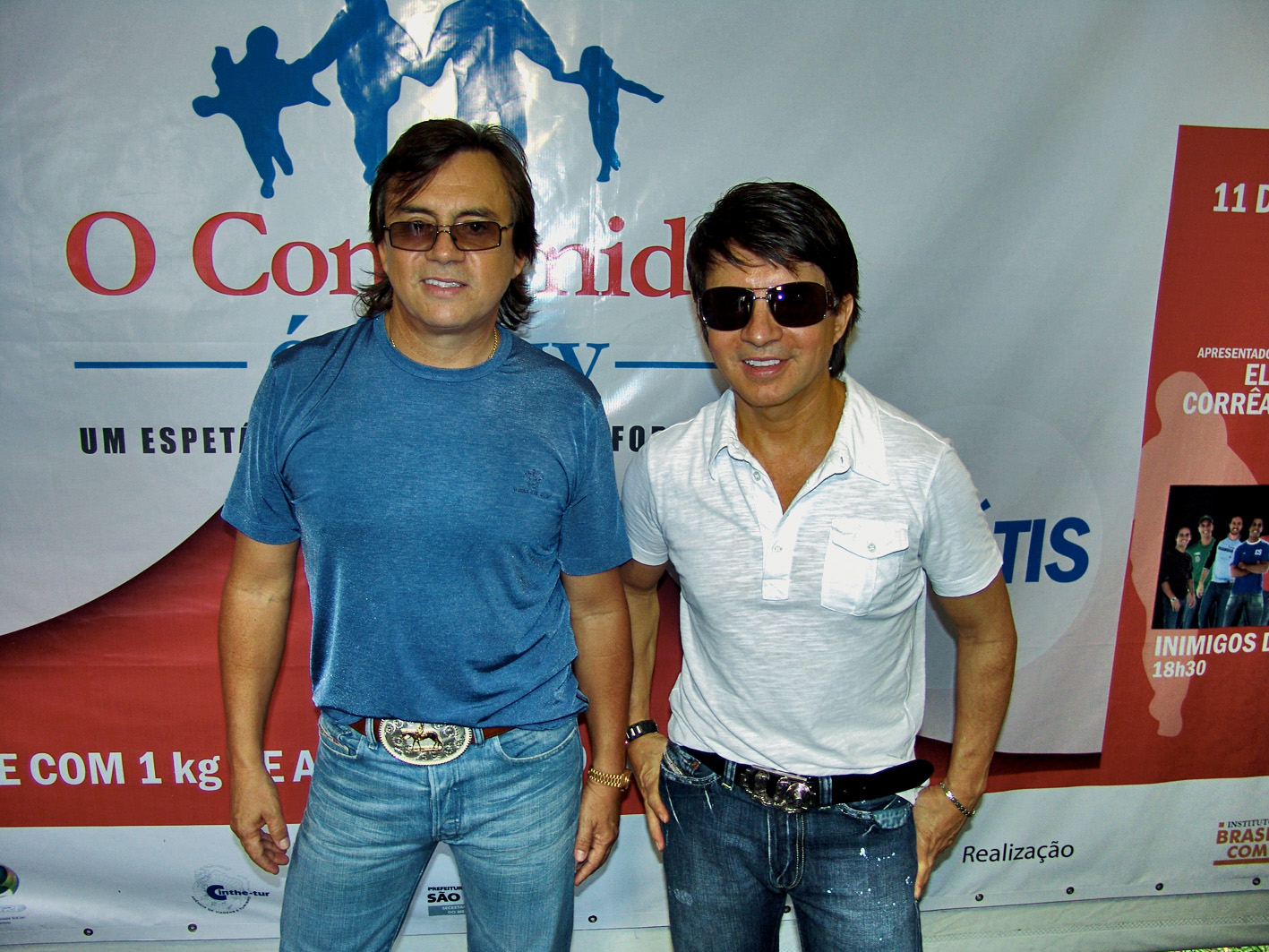
Chitãozinho & Xororó are an example of romantic sertanejo duos made of siblings.

Sertanejo universitário is a style that comes from a mix of Sertanejo, segments of freestyle with touches of beats coming from arrocha and vanerão. The recording industry launched in the 2000s, with names like Marcos & Leo, Joao Bosco & Vinicius, César Menotti & Fabiano, Jorge & Mateus, Victor & Leo, Fernando & Sorocaba, Marcos & Belutti, João Neto & Frederico. As this movement wins more supporters, the market formerly focused on that the advent of sertanejo artists and duos in Goias state, has today elected new idols in the state of Mato Grosso do Sul such as Luan Santana and Maria Cecilia & Rodolfo.

However, Goiás has not failed to reveal big names on the national scene, it appeared the aforementioned Jorge & Mateus and João Neto e Frederico. Not to mention the artists linked to the more massive sertanejo of the previous decade, as Guilherme & Santiago, Bruno & Marrone and Edson & Hudson. At that time, the artists get the music division, but a good part returns to the Caipira influences of moda de viola. Yet another part follows the trends of the past romantic that is the case of artists like Eduardo Costa and Léo Magalhães. This subgenre is sung by, and is more popular with, people attending college (in Portuguese: universitários, from "universidade"), this being the reason behind the name of this variation. This is the style of music played at university parties, like "Ai se eu te pego!" by Michel Teló, who found international success with the genre. This variation of sertanejo has more elements of pop as compared with others. This specific style has found favour internationally. Besides the massive success of "Ai se eu te pego!" on many charts, hits that have found commercial success in Europe and elsewhere include "Bara Bará Bere Berê, "Balada", "Eu Quero Tchu, Eu Quero Tcha" and "Lê Lê Lê."

Its appeal among the youth has garnered the attention of the new segment media. Simple music and lyrics, dance beats, and refrains that are easily memorized, have helped it spread from the restricted university environment to radios and festivals all over Brazil. The influence of the genre is leading to a rise in new sertanejo duos and groups.

The lyrics no longer talk only about failed relationships, but also about women, drinking, love affairs, sex, betrayal, ballads, drunkenness, and ostentation and there is influence from genres of Rio de Janeiro, like funk and samba and pagode.

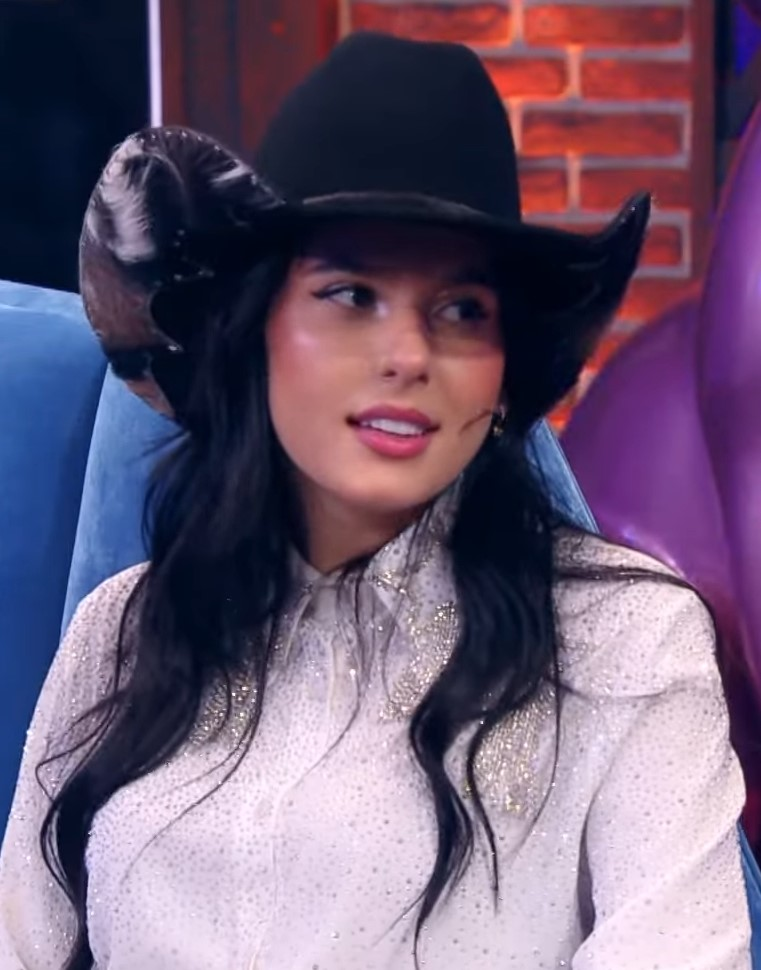
Ana Castela is recognized as one of the disseminators of agronejo in Brazil.

=== Agronejo ===
Agronejo is a Brazilian musical style that combines sertanejo with rap, funk and electronic music, as well as a vague inspiration from bro-country. The name is a portmanteau of agro, which denotes agribusiness, and -nejo, from sertanejo. The musical genre emerged around 2020, having its roots in the exaltation of agribusiness, reflecting the experiences and values of agrarian communities in economic and social growth.

The main artists who have stood out in this movement are Ana Castela, Luan Pereira, Léo & Raphael, Fiduma & Jeca, DJ Chris no Beat, Us Agroboy (duo of Gabriel Vittor and Jota Lennon), Bruna Viola and Loubet.

The rhythm attracts fans of sertanejo and those who enjoy more contemporary genres. However, the left-wing newspaper A Nova Democracia stated that "this may be the last stage in the decline of music financed by the old Brazilian landowning state. Its relations with Caipira music have completely run their course."

=== Trapnejo ===
Trapnejo is a mix of trap music and sertanejo, which came to the fore in 2020. This subgenre was created by singer Danilo "Dan" Oliveira Lellis, from Goiânia.

== List of sertanejo artists ==
(selective, alphabetical order)
(Artists with considerable crossover European and international success indicated with * asterisk)

Solos

- Cristiano Araújo
- Daniel
- Marília Mendonça
- Alex Ferrari*
- Gusttavo Lima*
- Sérgio Reis
- Leo Rodriguez*
- Luan Santana*
- Paula Fernandes*
- Michel Teló*

Duos

- Bruno e Marrone
- Chitãozinho & Xororó
- Fernando & Sorocaba
- Henrique e Juliano
- João Lucas & Marcelo
- João Neto e Frederico*
- Jorge & Mateus
- Leandro e Leonardo
- Maria Cecília & Rodolfo
- Milionário & José Rico
- Rick & Renner
- Thaeme & Thiago
- Tião Carreiro & Pardinho
- Tonico & Tinoco
- Victor & Leo
- Zezé Di Camargo & Luciano

== International sertanejo hits ==
(selected)

- "Ai Se Eu Te Pego!" by Michel Teló
- "Balada" by Gusttavo Lima
- "Bara Bará Bere Berê" – Three versions by Alex Ferrari, Leo Rodriguez and Michel Teló
- "Eu Quero Tchu, Eu Quero Tcha" by Flavel & Neto
- "Lê Lê Lê" by João Neto & Frederico
- "Camaro Amarelo" by Munhoz & Mariano
- "Você de Mim Não Sai" by Luan Santana

== See also ==
- Latin Grammy Award for Best Sertaneja Music Album
- List of Brazilian musicians
- Música sertaneja musicians
