= Jorge & Mateus =

Brazilian singing duo

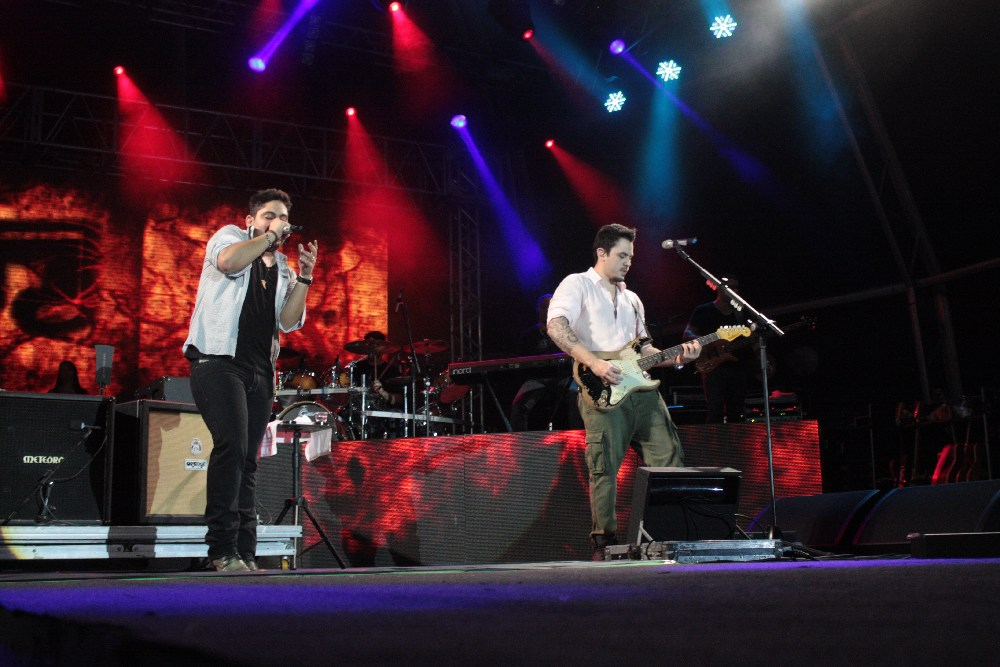

Background information
- Origin: Itumbiara, Goiás, Brazil
- Genres: Sertanejo music
- Years active: 2005–present
- Labels: Universal, Som Livre
- Members: Jorge Alves Barcelos; Mateus Pedro Liduário de Oliveira
- Website: jorgeemateus.com.br

Jorge & Mateus is a musical duo and one of the most famous interpreters of sertanejo music. The duo is composed of Goiás, Brazil-based vocalists Jorge Alves Barcelos (born August 27, 1982) and Mateus Pedro Liduário de Oliveira (born July 15, 1986). Both are from the city of Itumbiara, in the Brazilian state of Goiás and were initially signed to Universal Music label. The duo is currently signed to Som Livre label.

Jorge studied law school and Matheus agronomy. Each of them started singing sertaneja songs individually, and their careers met in 2005. They started performing in bars and concert halls in Goiás regions. In 2007, they released their first album produced by a record company Universal Music called Jorge & Mateus ao Vivo em Goiânia, a live concert with accompanying DVD. The song "Pode Chorar" became greatly celebrated and awarded Gold Record by ABPD, after having sold more than 100,000 paid downloads in Brazil. It was followed by "De tanto te querer" that was used in the soundtrack of the soap opera A Favorita, da Rede Globo.

In 2009, the duo released a second album titled O Mundo é Tão Pequeno, again a live album and accompanying double DVD and in 2010 Ao Vivo Sem Cortes and Aí Já Era.

In 2015, their album Os Anjos Cantam was nominated for the 16th Latin Grammy Awards in the Best Sertaneja Music Album category.

== Discography ==
=== Live/video albums ===
- (2007) Ao Vivo em Goiânia
- (2009) O Mundo é Tão Pequeno ao Vivo
- (2010) Ao Vivo Sem Cortes
- (2012) A Hora é Agora ao Vivo em Jurerê
- (2013) At the Royal Albert Hall – Live in London
- (2016) Como. Sempre Feito. Nunca
- (2016) 10 Anos
- (2018) Terra Sem CEP

=== Studio albums ===
- (2010) Aí Já Era
- (2015) Os Anjos Cantam

=== Compilation albums ===
- (2012) Essencial: Jorge & Mateus

== Awards and nominations ==
Year	Award	Category	For	Result
2010	Prêmio Multishow de Música Brasileira	Best Sertanejo Artists	Jorge & Mateus	Nominated
2011	Melhores do Ano	Best Band or Duo	Jorge & Mateus	Nominated
2011	Prêmio Multishow de Música Brasileira	Best Sertanejo Artists	Jorge & Mateus	Nominated
2012	Capricho Awards	Best Sertanejo Duo	Jorge & Mateus	Won
2012	Troféu Imprensa	Best Sertanejo Duo	Jorge & Mateus	Won
2013	Grammy Latino	Best Setanejo Album	A Hora é Agora ao Vivo em Jurerê	Nominated
2014	Melhores do Movimento Country	Best Sertanejo Duo	Jorge & Mateus	Won
2015	Grammy Latino	Best Sertanejo Album	Os Anjos Cantam	Nominated
