= Marília Mendonça discography =

Discography for the Brazilian musician Marília Mendonça

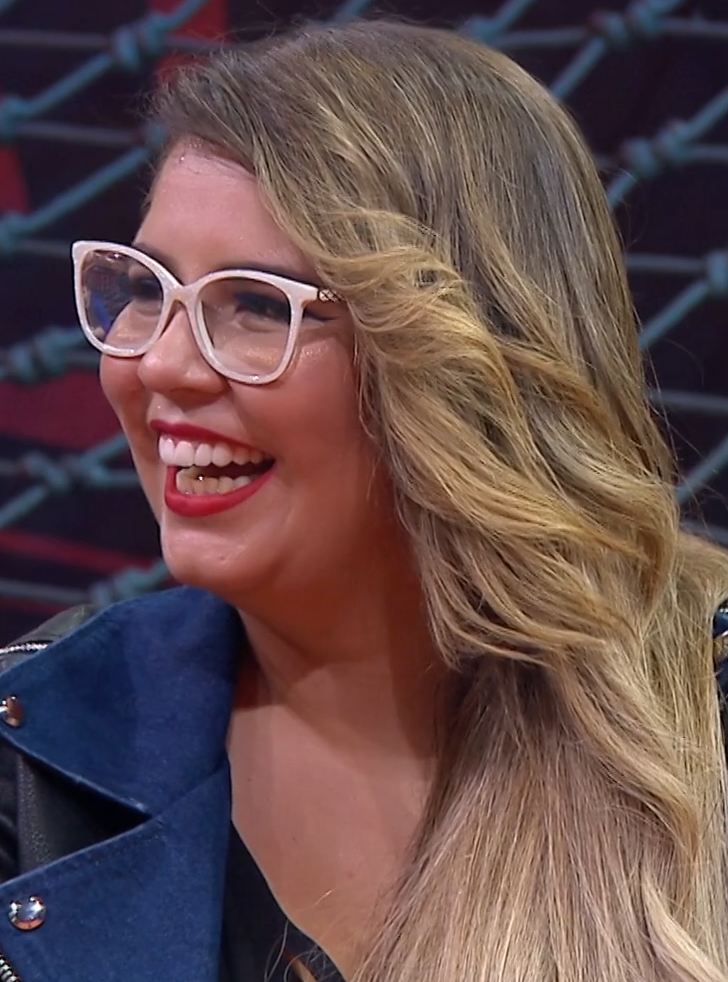
- Mendonça in 2018
- EPs: 6
- Live albums: 4
- Compilation albums: 1
- Singles: 14
- Collaborative albums: 2
- Collaborative EP: 4

Marília Mendonça was a Brazilian singer, composer, writer and Latin Grammy Award for Best Sertaneja Music Album winner. She released two collaborative studio albums, six extended-plays, four collaborative extended-plays, four live albums, one compilation album, and fourteen singles.

She started her career in 2014, releasing her homonymous first extended-play at the age of eighteen. In June 2015, Mendonça released her first single "Impasse", featuring the duo Henrique & Juliano. In March 2016, she released her first live album named Marília Mendonça: Ao Vivo, the album was a big success in Brazil, producing hits such as "Sentimento Louco" and "Infiel". In October of the same year, Mendonça released an acoustic extended play, Agora É Que São Elas.

In March 2017, Mendonça released her second live album Realidade, spawning hits like "Amante Não Tem Lar" and "De Quem É A Culpa". In February 2019, she released her last live album Todos Os Cantos, Vol. 1, her most successful project, featuring hits such as "Ciumeira", "Bem Pior Que Eu" and "Todo Mundo Vai Sofrer". Across her career, Marília Mendonça sold over 20 million records in Brazil (in certifications).

== Albums ==
=== Collaborative albums ===
List of collaborative studio albums
Title	Album details	Certifications
Patroas (with Maiara & Maraisa)	Released: 4 September 2020; Label: Som Livre; Formats: Digital download	PMB: 2× Diamond
Patroas 35% (with Maiara & Maraisa)	Released: 14 October 2021; Label: Som Livre; Formats: Digital download	PMB: 3× Diamond

=== Live albums ===
List of live albums, with selected chart positions
Title	Album details	Peak chart positions		Certifications
Title	Album details	BRA	POR	Certifications
Marília Mendonça: Ao Vivo	Released: 4 March 2016; Label: Som Livre; Formats: CD, DVD, digital download	1	7	PMB: 2× Diamond
Realidade: Ao Vivo em Manaus	Released: 6 March 2017; Label: Som Livre; Formats: CD, DVD, digital download	—	9	
Agora É Que São Elas 2 (with Maiara & Maraisa)	Released: 13 April 2018; Label: Som Livre; Formats: Digital download	—	—	
Todos Os Cantos, Vol. 1	Released: 22 February 2019; Label: Som Livre; Formats: CD, DVD, digital download	—	—	PMB: 4× Diamond
"—" denotes a recording that did not chart or was not released in that territory.

=== Compilation albums ===
List of compilation albums
Title	Details
Perfil (Ao Vivo)	Released: 28 February 2018; Label: Som Livre; Formats: Digital download

=== Posthumous albums ===
List of posthumous studio albums
Title	Album details	Certifications
Decretos Reais	Released: 25 May 2023; Label: Som Livre; Formats: Digital download	PMB: Diamond

== Extended plays ==
List of extended plays
Title	Details	Certifications
Marília Mendonça	Released: 9 January 2014; Label: Work Show; Formats: Digital download	
Agora É Que São Elas	Released: 2 September 2016; Label: Som Livre; Formats: Digital download	
Marília Mendonça	Released: 13 January 2017; Label: Som Livre; Formats: Digital download	
Todos Os Cantos, Vol. 2	Released: 17 May 2019; Label: Som Livre; Formats: Digital download	PMB: Diamond
Todos Os Cantos, Vol. 3	Released: 16 August 2019; Label: Som Livre; Formats: Digital download	PMB: 3× Platinum
Nosso Amor Envelheceu	Released: 2 July 2021; Label: Som Livre; Formats: Digital download	
Decretos Reais, Vol. 1	Released: 21 July 2022; Label: Som Livre; Formats: Digital download	
Decretos Reais, Vol. 2	Released: 9 December 2022; Label: Som Livre; Formats: Digital download	
Decretos Reais, Vol. 3	Released: 17 March 2023; Label: Som Livre; Formats: Digital download	

=== Collaborative extended plays ===
List of collaborative extended plays
Title	Details
Patroas, EP 1 (with Maiara & Maraisa)	Released: 10 July 2020; Label: Som Livre; Formats: Digital download
Patroas, EP 2 (with Maiara & Maraisa)	Released: 24 July 2020; Label: Som Livre; Formats: Digital download
Patroas, EP 3 (with Maiara & Maraisa)	Released: 7 August 2020; Label: Som Livre; Formats: Digital download
Patroas, EP 4 (with Maiara & Maraisa)	Released: 21 August 2020; Label: Som Livre; Formats: Digital download

== Charted singles ==
List of charted singles, with selected chart positions
Title	Year	Peak chart positions			Certifications	Album
Title	Year	BRA	POR	WW	Certifications	Album
"Some que ele vem atrás" (with Anitta)	2019	—	63	—	PMB: 2× Diamond; AFP: Platinum	Non-album singles
"Graveto"	2020	—	69	—	PMB: 9× Diamond; AFP: Gold	Non-album singles
"Melhor Sozinha" (with Luísa Sonza)	2021	—	187	—	PMB: 2× Diamond	Non-album singles
"Vai Lá Em Casa Hoje" (with George Henrique & Rodrigo)	2021	5	—	105		Non-album singles
"Mal Feito" (with Hugo & Guilherme)	2022	2	64	104	PMB: 4× Diamond; AFP: Gold	Non-album singles
"—" denotes a recording that did not chart or was not released in that territory.

== Charted songs ==
List of charted songs, with selected chart positions
Title	Year	Peak chart positions			Certifications	Album
Title	Year	BRA	POR	WW	Certifications	Album
"Infiel"	2021	—	94	—	PMB: 6× Diamond	Marília Mendonça (Ao Vivo)
"Amante não tem lar"	2021	—	196	—	PMB: 4× Diamond	Marília Mendonça (Ao Vivo) EP
"De quem é a culpa?"	2021	—	46	—	PMB: 5× Diamond; AFP: Gold	Marília Mendonça (Ao Vivo) EP
"Eu sei de cor"	2021	—	162	—	PMB: 4× Diamond	Marília Mendonça (Ao Vivo) EP
"Ausência"	2021	—	178	—		Perfil
"Ciumeira"	2021	—	76	—	PMB: 7× Diamond; AFP: Gold	Todos Os Cantos, Vol. 1 (ao Vivo)
"Sem sal"	2021	—	121	—	PMB: 4× Diamond; AFP: Gold	Todos Os Cantos, Vol. 1 (ao Vivo)
"Bem pior que eu"	2021	—	99	—	PMB: 7× Diamond; AFP: Gold	Todos Os Cantos, Vol. 1 (ao Vivo)
"Bye Bye"	2021	—	168	—	PMB: 3× Diamond	Todos Os Cantos, Vol. 1 (ao Vivo)
"Bebi liguei"	2021	—	47	—	PMB: 9× Diamond; AFP: Platinum	Todos Os Cantos, Vol. 1 (ao Vivo)
"Passa mal"	2021	—	160	—	PMB: 3× Diamond	Todos Os Cantos, Vol. 1 (ao Vivo)
"Bebaça"	2021	—	89	—	PMB: 5× Diamond; AFP: Gold	Todos Os Cantos, Vol. 1 (ao Vivo)
"Todo mundo vai sofrer"	2021	—	26	—	PMB: 8× Diamond; AFP: Platinum	Todos Os Cantos, Vol. 2 (ao Vivo)
"Serenata"	2021	—	156	—	PMB: 5× Diamond; AFP: Gold	Todos Os Cantos, Vol. 2 (ao Vivo)
"Apaixonadinha" (featuring Léo Santana and Didá Banda Feminina)	2021	—	55	—	PMB: 5× Diamond; AFP: Gold	Todos Os Cantos, Vol. 2 (ao Vivo)
"Supera"	2021	—	27	—	PMB: 10× Diamond; AFP: Platinum	Todos Os Cantos, Vol. 3 (ao Vivo)
"Quero você do jeito que quiser" (with Maiara & Maraisa)	2021	—	97	—	PMB: 6× Diamond; AFP: Gold	Patroas
"Troca de calçada"	2021	—	65	—	PMB: 9× Diamond	Nosso Amor Envelheceu
"Esqueça-me se for capaz" (with Maiara & Maraisa)	2021	8	15	97	PMB: 9× Diamond; AFP: Platinum	Patroas 35%
"Todo mundo menos você" (with Maiara & Maraisa)	2021	21	24	112	PMB: 7× Diamond; AFP: Gold	Patroas 35%
"Motel Afrodite" (with Maiara & Maraisa)	2021	—	99	—	PMB: 3× Diamond	Patroas 35%
"Não sei o que lá" (with Maiara & Maraisa)	2021	—	93	—	PMB: 5× Diamond	Patroas 35%
"Presepada" (with Maiara & Maraisa)	2021	14	40	170	PMB: 7× Diamond; AFP: Gold	Patroas 35%
"Fã clube" (with Maiara & Maraisa)	2021	—	139	—	PMB: 2× Diamond	Patroas 35%
"Te Amo Demais"	2022	4	137	—	PMB: 4× Diamond	Decretos Reais, Vol. 1
"Leão"	2023	1	32	51	PMB: 12× Diamond	Decretos Reais, Vol. 2
"—" denotes a recording that did not chart or was not released in that territory.
