= Mari Fernandez discography =

This is a comprehensive listing of official releases by Mari Fernandez, a Brazilian singer-songwriter. Since 2021, she has released two studio albums and two live albums on Sony Music Entertainment.

== Albums ==
Studio albums

Title	Details
Piseiro Sofrência	Released: 29 April 2021; Formats: Streaming, Digital download; Label: Sony; Track listing: 1. Amizade Colorida; 2. Não, Não Vou; 3. Agonia; 4. Acorrentado em Você; 5. Coração Bandido; 6. Salva-Me; 7. Quero Você do Jeito Que Quiser; 8. Não Tava Pronta Pra te Ver; 9. Agonia (with Vitor Fernandes); 10. Com Você ou Sem
Quando Tem Sentimento	Released: 15 December 2022; Formats: Streaming, digital download; Label: Sony; Track listing: 1. Quando Tem Sentimento; 2. Respeita Seu Ex (with Murilo Huff); 3. Apaixonada Errada; 4. Cão Sem Dono; 5. Depois de Você (Melhor Escolha); 6. Desistiu de Mim; 7. Prefiro a Verdade; 8. Não Vou Sofrer Sozinho; 9. Não Tem Limitez

Live albums

Title	Details
Ao Vivo em Fortaleza	Released: 20 April 2022; Formats: DVD, streaming, digital download; Label: Sony; Track listing: 1. Eu Quero Recair (with Simone & Simaria); 2. Para de Me Assistir; 3. Vai Doer Mais; 4. Pode Apostar (com Xand Avião); 5. Comunicação Falhou (with Nattan); 6. Quem Vale Menos; 7. Intuição; 8. Só de Imaginar (with Zé Vaqueiro); 9. É Comigo Mesmo; 10. Câmera Lenta; 11. Amar Não é Obrigação; 12. Agonia; 13. Não, Não Vou; 14. Amizade Colorida; 15. Saudade Carinhosa
Mari Fernandez Ao Vivo em São Paulo	Released: 19 April 2023; Formats: DVD, streaming, digital download; Label: Sony; Track listing: 1. Tortura; 2. Fora dos Stories; 3. Frouxo (with Maiara & Maraisa); 4. Amor Sem Compromisso (with Wesley Safadão); 5. Quando Tem Sentimento; 6. Marquinha do Carinho (with Hugo & Guilherme); 7. Deixa Eu Viver (with Luísa Sonza); 8. Ainda Existe Amor; 9. É Pra Sofrer Calado; 10. Tu Não Quer Me Amar; 11. Por Que Te Amo (Paradise); 12. Sua Namorada Me Ama; 13. Por Mais Que Doa; 14. Te Esquecer Pra Ontem; 15. Eu Te Amo Mas Te Odeio; 16. Depois de Você; 17. Bloqueadim; 18. Cão Sem Dono; 19. Apaixonada Errada; 20. Desistiu de Mim

Compilation albums

- Mari Fernandez – As Mais Tocadas (2022)
- Mari Fernandez – As Melhores (2022)

EPs

Title	Details
Pra Lascar o Coração, Vol. 1	Released: 12 August 2021; Formats: Streaming, digital download; Label: Sony; Track listing: 1. Marionete; 2. Saudade Carinhosa; 3. Lascar Seu Coração
Pra Lascar o Coração, Vol. 2	Released: 13 January 2022; Formats: Streaming, digital download; Label: Sony; Track listing: 1. Quem Vale Menos; 2. Parada Louca (com Marcynho Sensação); 3. De Vez em Sempre; 4. Vida Que Segre; 5. Ainda Tem Sentimento
Luau Amazon Music Mari Fernandez (Amazon Original)	Released: 10 February 2022; Formats: Streaming, digital download; Label: Amazon Music; Track listing: 1. Agonia; 2. Saudade Carinhosa; 3. Vida que Segue; 4. De Vez em Sempre; 5. Olha o Que o Amor Me Faz

== Singles ==
=== As lead artist ===
List of singles as lead artist with chart positions, showing year released
Song	Year	Peaks			Album
Song	Year	BRA	BRA Billb.	POR	Album
"Não, Não Vou" (Passa Lá em Casa)"	2021	18	—	24	Piseiro Sofrência
"Agonia" (with Vitor Fernandes)	2021	—	—	—	Piseiro Sofrência
"Cafajeste (Forró Viral)"	2021	—	—	—	Non-album singles
"Parada Louca" (with Marcynho Sensação)	2021	81	9	94	Non-album singles
"Hoje Eu Vou Te Usar" (with Felipe Amorim)	2022	—	—	—	Non-album singles
"Intuição"	2022	91	—	—	Ao Vivo em Fortaleza
"Só de Imaginar" (with Zé Vaqueiro)	2022	—	—	—	Ao Vivo em Fortaleza
"Pode Apostar" (with Xand Avião)	2022	—	—	—	Ao Vivo em Fortaleza
"Comunicação Falhou" (with Nattan)	2022	—	9	—	Ao Vivo em Fortaleza
"Eu Quero Recair" (with Simone & Simaria)	2022	—	—	—	Ao Vivo em Fortaleza
"Cão Sem Dono"	2022	—	—	—	Quando Tem Sentimento
"Respeita Seu Ex" (with Murilo Huff)	2022	—	—	—	Quando Tem Sentimento
"Love Absurdo" (with MC Ryan SP and MC Daniel)	2023	—	—	—	Non-album single
"Marquinha do Carinho" (with Hugo & Guilherme)	2023	—	—	—	Mari Fernandez Ao Vivo em São Paulo
"Frouxo" (with Maiara & Maraisa)	2023	—	—	—	Mari Fernandez Ao Vivo em São Paulo
"Deixa Eu Viver" (with Luísa Sonza)	2023	76	—	—	Mari Fernandez Ao Vivo em São Paulo
"Amor Sem Compromisso" (with Wesley Safadão)	2023	—	—	—	Mari Fernandez Ao Vivo em São Paulo
"Sarradinha" (with MC Pedrinho)	2023	—	—	—	Non-album singles
"Adeus"	2023	40	—	—	Non-album singles
"Vai Viver"	2024	—	60	—	Non-album singles
"Dizem que sou Louca"	2024	99	—	—	
"—" denotes a recording that did not chart or was not released in that territory.

=== As featured artist ===
List of singles as featured artist with chart positions, showing year released
Single	Year	Peaks			Certifications	Album
Single	Year	BRA	BRA Billb.	POR	Certifications	Album
"Ficante Fiel" (Mad Dogz feat. Mari Fernandez)	2021	—	—	—		Non-album singles
"É a Vez dos Meninos" (Nanara Bello feat. Mari Fernandez)	2021	—	—	—		Non-album singles
"Story Mentiroso" (Gabi Martins feat. Mari Fernandez)	2021	—	—	—		Non-album singles
"Love Cabuloso" (VT Kebradeira feat. Mari Fernandez)	2021	—	—	—		Non-album singles
"Áudio Que Te Entrega" (Leo Santana feat. MC Don Juan and Mari Fernandez)	2022	—	17	—		GG Astral
"Serenata" (Ávine Vinny feat. Mari Fernandez)	2022	—	—	—		220 Volts (Ao Vivo)
"Love Terremoto (Os Barões da Pisadinha feat. Mari Fernandez)	2022	—	—	—		Resenha Preferida (Ao Vivo)
"Eu Gosto Assim" (Gustavo Mioto feat. Mari Fernandez)	2022	2	1	31	AFP: Platinum	Non-album single
"O Inverno Acabou" (Limão com Mel feat. Mari Fernandez)	2022	—	—	—		Estúdio Limão 2
"Negócio na Cama" (Priscila Senna feat. Mari Fernandez)	2022	—	—	—		Non-album singles
"Eu Já Mudei" (Marttin Monteiro feat. Mari Fernandez)	2022	—	—	—		Non-album singles
"Conduta" (Nattan feat. Mari Fernandez)	2022	—	—	—	PMB: 2× Platinum	O Fantástico Mundo de Nattan
"Cuidado" (Thiago Aquino feat. Mari Fernandez)	2023	—	—	—		Non-album singles
"Pessoa Errada" (Paulo & Nathan feat. Mari Fernandez)	2023	—	—	—		Non-album singles
"Eu Gosto Assim (Dennis Remix)" (Gustavo Mioto feat. Mari Fernandez and Dennis DJ)	2023	—	—	—		Non-album singles
"Me Revolta" (Tarcísio do Acordeon feat. Mari Fernandez)	2023	—	—	—		Non-album singles
"Várias Bebezinhas" (Xand Avião feat. Mari Fernandez)	2023	—	—	—		Non-album singles
"Não Vitalício (Nunca Mais)" (Matheus & Kauan feat. Mari Fernandez)	2023	5	6	—		Basiquinho 2 (Ao Vivo)
"Seu Brilho Sumiu" (Israel & Rodolffo feat. Mari Fernandez)	2023	61	3	125	PMB: 4× Diamond	Let's Bora, Vol. 2 (Ao Vivo)
"Meu Vício" (Michel Teló feat. Mari Fernandez)	2023	12	—	—		Non-album singles
"Cê Nem Me Superou" (Matheus Ximenes feat. Mari Fernandez)	2023	—	—	—		Non-album singles
"Amor ou Paixão" (Eliane feat. Mari Fernandez, Dorgival Dantas, Naiara Azevedo, Taty Girl, Walkyria Santos, Solange Almeida and Joelma)	2023	—	—	—		Non-album singles
"Abismo" (Manu feat. Mari Fernandez)	2023	—	100	—		Non-album singles
"Erro da Minha Vida" (Solange Almeida feat. Mari Fernandez)	2023	—	47	—		Non-album singles
"Parque de Diversões" (João Bosco & Vinícius feat. Mari Fernandez)	2023	52	99	—		Non-album singles
"O Seu Grande Amor" (Eliane feat. Mari Fernandez)	2023	—	—	—		Non-album singles
"Fazendinha Sessions #4: Trem Perfeito" (Fazendinha Sessions feat. MC Ryan SP, João Gomes, Us Agroboy, Zé Felipe, Mari Fernandez, Luan Pereira and Mayck & Lyan)	2023	—	—	—		Non-album singles
"Malícia" (Murilo Huff feat. Mari Fernandez)	2024	—	—	—		Fortaleza, Vol.1 (Ao Vivo)
"Peguei, Pegava e Pegaria" (Bruninho & Davi feat. Mari Fernandez)	2024	—	—	—		Non-album single
"30 Cadeados" (Gusttavo Lima feat. Mari Fernandez)	2024	—	18	—		Paraíso Particular Vol. 01 (Ao Vivo)
"Falta de Mim" (Ludmilla feat. Mari Fernandez)	2024	—	53	—		Numanice 3: Ao Vivo
"Virou Love" (Melody feat. Mari Fernandez)	2024	—	—	—		Non-album single
"—" denotes a recording that did not chart or was not released in that territory.

=== Promotional singles ===
Title	Year	Album
"Vazou um Áudio" (with Ávine Vinny)	2021	Non-album singles
"Vazou um Áudio (funk remix)" (with Ávine Vinny and Sr. Nescau)	2021	Non-album singles
"Boca Semi Nua" (with Diego & Arnaldo)	2022	Non-album singles
"Ainda Não Tô Pronta" (with Paula Fernandes)	2022	Non-album singles
"Inveja no Povo" (with Zé Vaqueiro and Sorriso Maroto)	2022	Non-album singles
"Foi Ótimo" (with Turma do Pagode)	2022	Non-album singles
"Lua"	2022	Na Pegada do Bichão
"Me Abraça" (with Nattan)	2022	Na Pegada do Bichão
"Você Não Entende Nada"	2022	Non-album single
