= Latin Grammy Award for Best Sertaneja Music Album =

Latin Grammy Award category

- Awarded for: Vocal or instrumental Sertaneja music albums containing at least 51% playing time of newly recorded material. For Solo artists, duos or groups.
- Country: United States
- Presented by: The Latin Recording Academy
- First award: 2000
- Currently held by: Chitãozinho & Xororó for José & Durval (2025)
- Website: latingrammy.com

The Latin Grammy Award for Best Sertaneja Music Album is an honor presented annually at the Latin Grammy Awards, a ceremony that recognizes excellence and creates a wider awareness of cultural diversity and contributions of Latin recording artists in the United States and internationally.

According to the category description guide for the 13th Latin Grammy Awards, the award is for vocal or instrumental Sertaneja music albums containing at least 51% playing time of newly recorded material by solo artists, duos, or groups.

It was first presented at the 1st Annual Latin Grammy Awards in 2000. From 2004 to 2008 the category was not presented. In 2009, the category was re-introduced with Sérgio Reis receiving the award for Coração Estradeiro.

Brazilian sertanejo duo Chitãozinho & Xororó hold the record of most wins in the category with four, followed by Sérgio Reis with three wins. Reis was also the first recipient of the award for his album Sérgio Reis e Convidados. Other multiple winners are duo Zezé Di Camargo & Luciano and singer Paula Fernandes with two wins each. In 2022, singer Marília Mendonça received a posthumous nomination for Patroas 35% alongside the duo Maiara & Maraísa. The following year, she won the award for Decretos Reais.

== Recipients ==
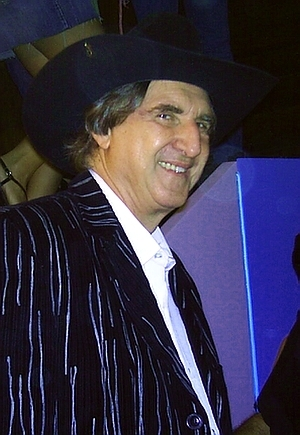
Sérgio Reis was the first winner of this award in 2000 for Sérgio Reis e Convidados, since then he has won three more times, in 2009, 2014 and 2015.

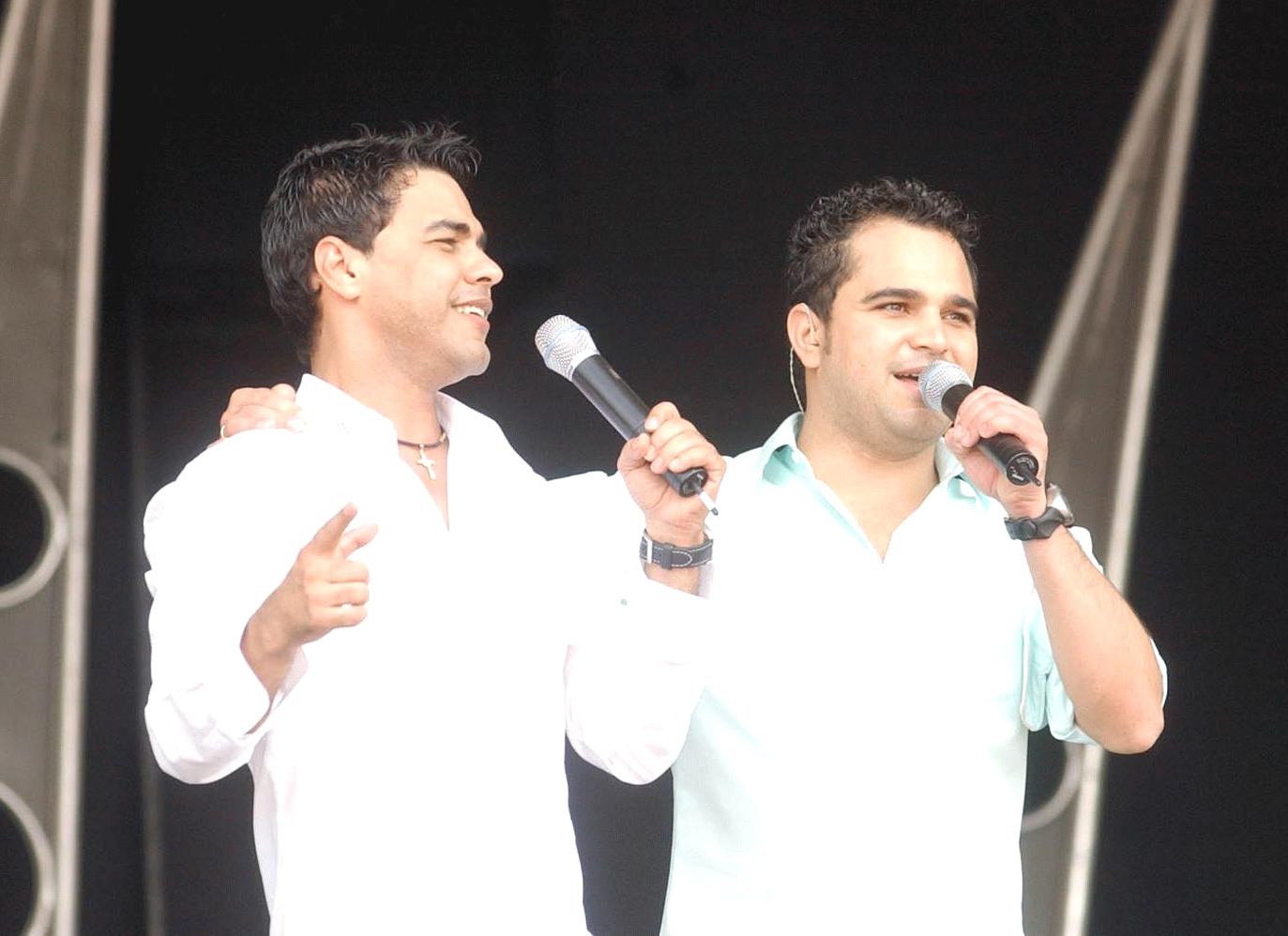
Zezé Di Camargo & Luciano have received this award twice, in 2003 and 2010.

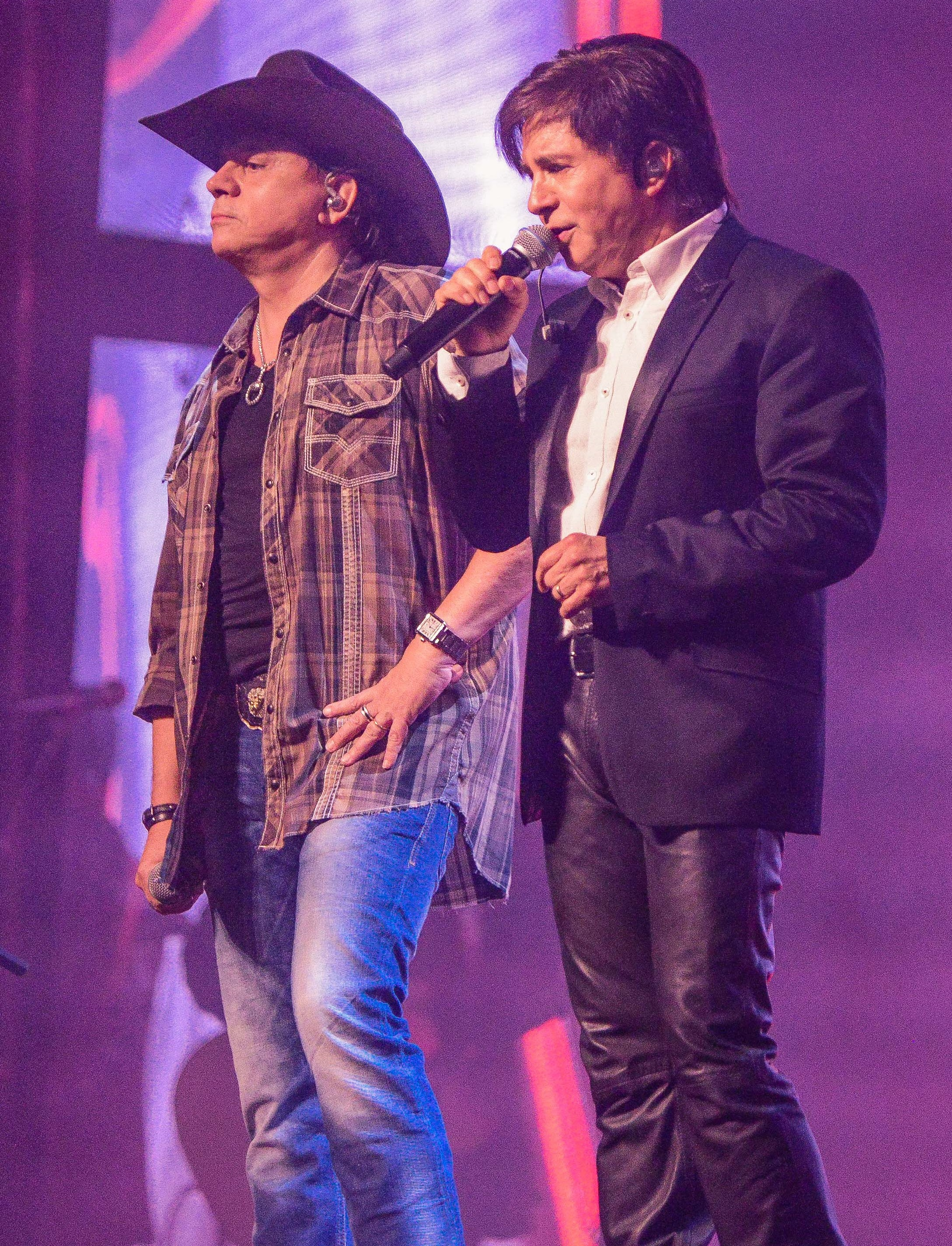
Chitãozinho & Xororó have received this award five times, in 2012, 2018, 2021, 2022 and 2025.

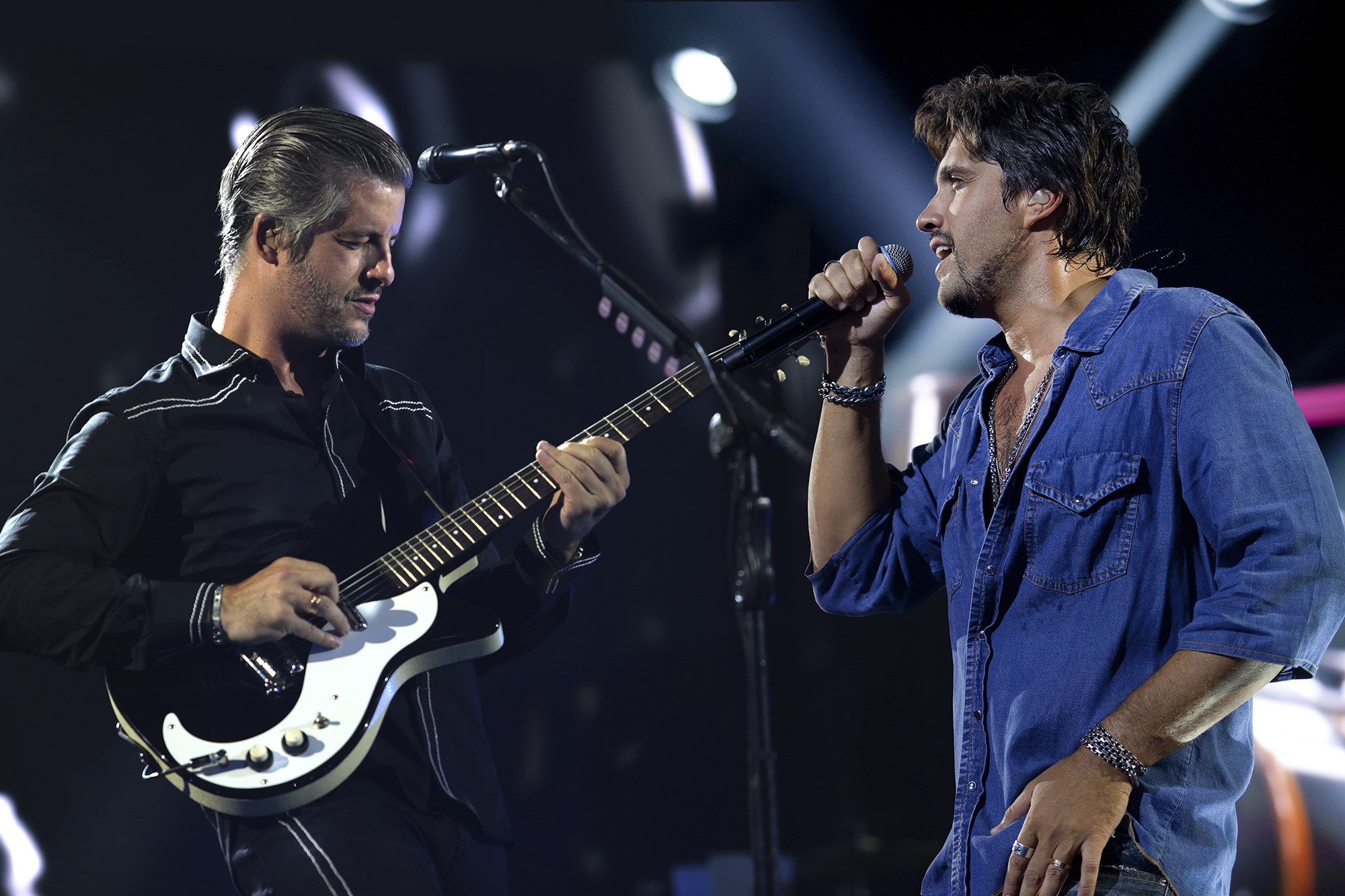
2013 winner Victor & Leo.

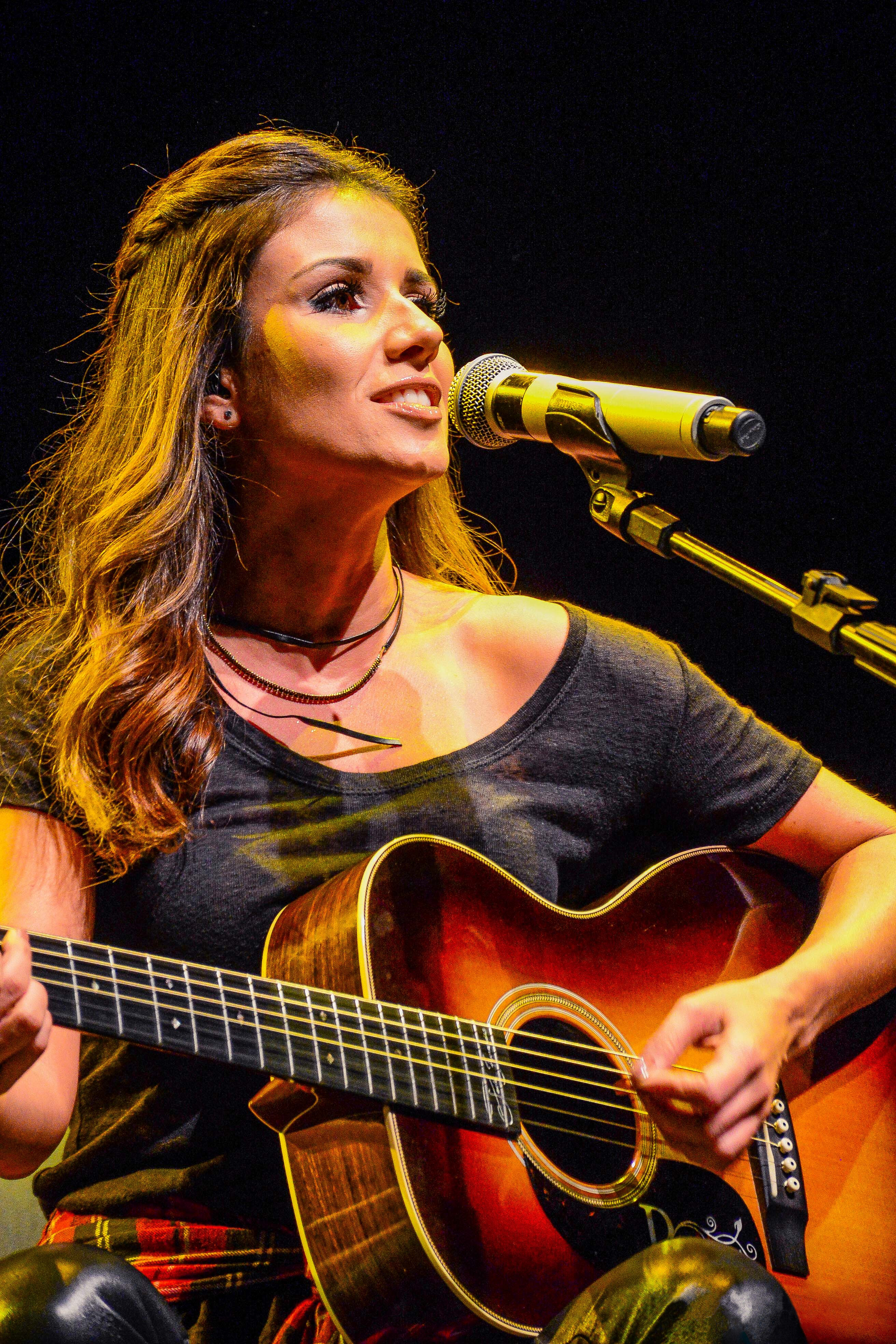
Paula Fernandes has won twice, in 2016 and 2020.

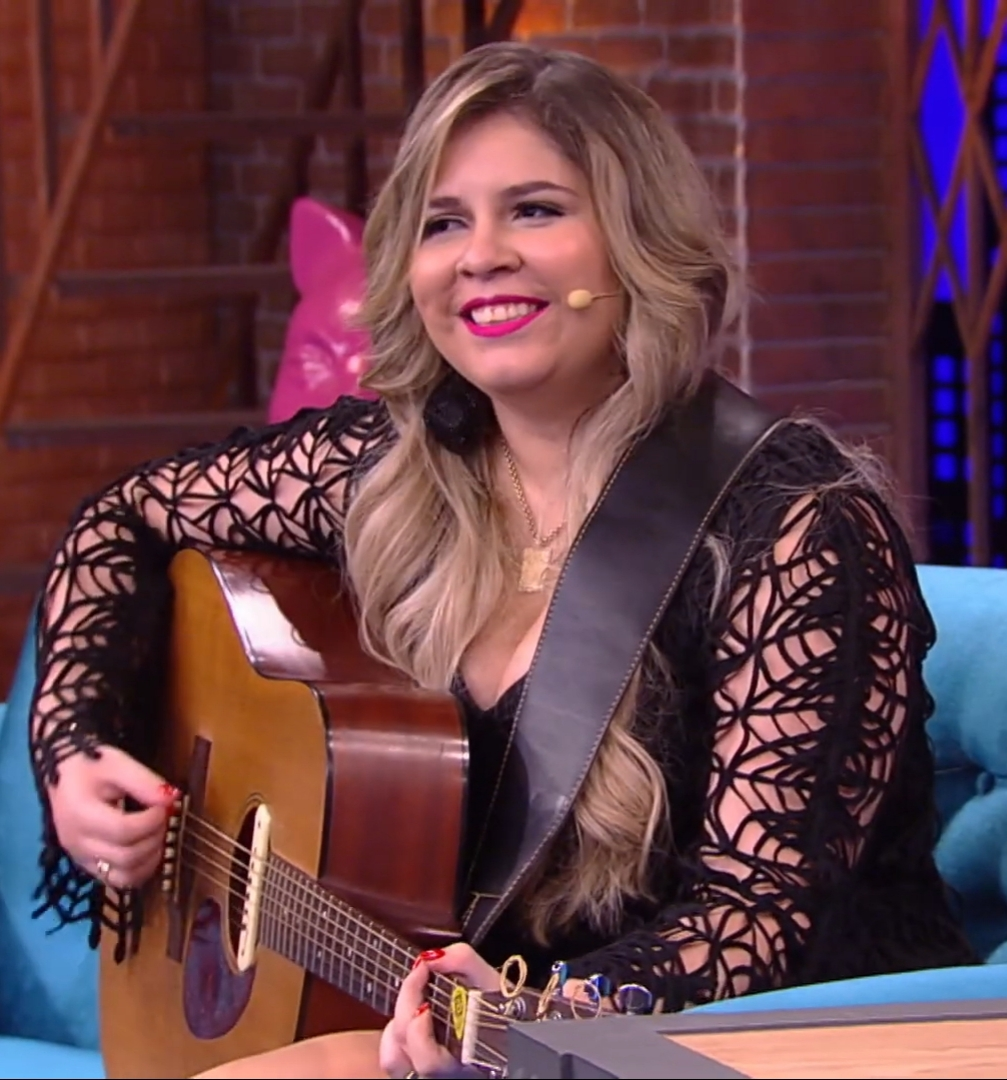
Two-time winner, Marília Mendonça.

Year	Performing artist(s)	Work	Nominees	Ref.
2000	Sérgio Reis	Sérgio Reis e Convidados	Zezé Di Camargo & Luciano – Zezé di Camargo y Luciano; Leonardo – Tempo; Roberta Miranda – Ao Vivo - A majestade o sabiá; Wilson & Soraya – Nada foi em vão	
2001	Pena Branca	Semente Caipira	Bruno & Marrone – Acústico; Leonardo – Quero Colo; Roberta Miranda – Histórias De Amor; Sérgio Reis – Sérgio Reis; Rionegro & Solimões – Bate O Pé Ao Vivo	
2002	Bruno & Marrone	Acústico – Ao Vivo	Zezé Di Camargo & Luciano – Zeze Di Camargo e Luciano; Marlon & Maicon – Marlon e Maicon; Rio Negro and Solimoes – So Alegria; Trio Parada Dura – Brilhante	
2003	Zezé Di Camargo & Luciano	Zezé Di Camargo e Luciano	Bruno & Marrone – Minha Vida Minha Musica; Chitãozinho & Xororó – Festa Do Interior; Edson & Hudson – Acústico Ao Vivo; Gian & Giovani – Gian and Giovani; Milionario and José Rico – O Dono Do Mundo; Comitiva Brasil – 100% Sertanejo	
2009	Sérgio Reis	Coração Estradeiro	João Bosco & Vinícius – Curtição; Bruno & Marrone – De Volta Aos Bares; Edson & Hudson – Despedida; César Menotti and Fabiano – Voz Do Coração (Ao Vivo); Victor & Leo – Borboletas	
2010	Zezé Di Camargo & Luciano	Double Face	João Bosco & Vinícius – Coração Apaixonou - Ao Vivo; Chitãozinho & Xororó – Se For Pra Ser Feliz; Leonardo – Esse Alguém Sou Eu; César Menotti & Fabiano – Retrato: Ao Vivo no estúdio; Luan Santana – Ao Vivo; Victor & Leo – Ao Vivo e em Cores em São Paulo	
2011	João Bosco & Vinícius	João Bosco & Vinícius	Paula Fernandes – Paula Fernandes Ao Vivo; Leonardo – Alucinação; Roberta Miranda – Sorrir Faz A Vida Valer; Michel Teló – Ao Vivo	
2012	Chitãozinho & Xororó	Chitãozinho & Xororó - 40 Anos - Sinfônico	Daniel – Pra Ser Feliz; Fernando & Sorocaba – Acústico na Ópera de Arame; Paula Fernandes – Meus Encantos; Luan Santana – Quando Chega A Noite; Michel Teló – Michel na Balada; Victor & Leo – Amor de Alma	
2013	Victor & Leo	Ao Vivo em Floripa	João Bosco & Vinícius – A Festa; Jorge & Mateus – A Hora é Agora - Ao Vivo em Jurerê; Marcos & Belutti – Cores; Michel Teló – Sunset	
2014	Sérgio Reis	Questão de Tempo	Chitãozinho & Xororó – Do Tamanho Do Nosso Amor - Ao Vivo; Paula Fernandes – Multishow Ao Vivo – Um Ser Amor; Rick & Renner – Bom De Dança Vol. 2; Victor & Leo – Viva Por Mim	
2015	Renato Teixeira and Sérgio Reis	Amizade Sincera II	Jorge & Mateus – Os Anjos Cantam; Leonardo & Eduardo Costa – Cabaré; Michel Teló – Bem Sertanejo; Victor & Leo – Irmãos	
2016	Paula Fernandes	Amanhecer	Leonardo – Bar do Leo; Lucas Lucco – Adivinha; Michel Teló – Baile do Teló; João Victor – Sóis	
2017	Daniel	Daniel	Day & Lara – (...); Luan Santana – 1977; Marília Mendonça – Realidade ao vivo em Manaus; Simone & Simaria – Live	
2018	Chitãozinho & Xororó	Elas Em Evidências	Solange Almeida – Sentimento de Mulher; As Galvão – 70 Anos; Naiara Azevedo – Contraste; Zezé Di Camargo & Luciano – Dois Tempos, Parte 2; Fernando & Sorocaba – Sou Do Interior (Ao Vivo); Michel Teló – Bem Sertanejo - O Show	
2019	Marília Mendonça	Todos os Cantos	Paula Fernandes – Hora Certa; Francis & Felipe – Francis & Felipe; Luan Santana – Live Movel; Mano Walter – Ao Vivo em São Paulo	
2020	Paula Fernandes	Origens (Ao vivo em Sete Lagoas, Brazil/2019)	Fernando & Sorocaba – #Isso é Churrasco (Ao vivo) [Deluxe]; Lauana Prado – Livre Vol. 1; Michel Teló – Churrasco Do Teló Vol. 2; Zé Neto & Cristiano – Por Mais Beijos Ao Vivo (Ao vivo)	
2021	Chitãozinho & Xororó	Tempo de Romance	Daniel – Daniel em Casa; Marília Mendonça, Maiara & Maraísa – Patroas; Os Barões da Pisadinha – Conquistas; Michel Teló – Pra Ouvir No Fone	
2022	Chitãozinho & Xororó	Chitãozinho & Xororó Legado	Gabeu – Agropoc; Matheus & Kauan – Expectativa x Realidade; Marília Mendonça & Maiara & Maraísa – Patroas 35%; Lauana Prado – Natural	
2023	Marília Mendonça	Decretos Reais	Chitãozinho & Xororó – Ao Vivo no Radio City Music Hall Nova Iorque; Daniel – Daniel 40 Anos Celebra João Paulo & Daniel; Jorge & Mateus – É Simples Assim (Ao Vivo); Lauana Prado – Raiz	
2024	Ana Castela	Boiadeira Internacional (Ao Vivo)	Gusttavo Lima – Paraíso Particular (Ao Vivo); Simone Mendes – Cintilante (Ao Vivo); Lauana Prado – Raiz Goiânia (Ao Vivo); Luan Santana – Luan City 2.0 (Ao Vivo)	
2025	Chitãozinho & Xororó	José & Durval	Ana Castela – Let's Go Rodeo; Léo Foguete – Obrigado Deus; Lauana Prado – Transcende (Ao Vivo / Deluxe); Tierry – Do Velho Testamento	
