= Murilo Huff =

Brazilian singer and songwriter (born 1995)

- Born: 14 October 1995 (age 30); Goiânia, Goiás, Brazil
- Genre: Sertanejo
- Occupations: Singer; songwriter; instrumentalist
- Instrument: Vocals
- Years active: 2015–present
- Partner: Marília Mendonça (2018–2021)

Murilo Huff (born 14 October 1995) is a Brazilian singer, songwriter and instrumentalist of sertanejo music.

== Biography ==
Born in Goiânia, the son of Zaida Huff and Dagmar Huff, Huff started in the music scene as a songwriter. His compositions were recorded by several artists, such as Michel Teló, Bruno & Marrone, Lucas Lucco and Naiara Azevedo. In 2017, Huff began to gain prominence as a songwriter, with the recording of "Transplante", by singer and songwriter Marília Mendonça. The following year, Mendonça recorded another composition by Huff, "Bem Pior Que Eu", which was also a commercial success.

In 2018, Huff launched his solo career and released the album Pra Ouvir Tomando Uma, which gained notoriety especially for the song "Dois Enganados", featuring Mendonça, his girlfriend at the time. The project gained a sequel in 2021, called Pra Ouvir Tomando Uma 2. The songs "Uma Ex", "Frieza" and "Desejando Eu" received, respectively, double platinum, platinum and double diamond certifications.

== Personal life ==
Between 2018 and 2021, Huff dated Marília Mendonça, who died in a plane crash on 5 November 2021. The couple's son, named Léo, was born on 16 December 2019. In 2026, he got engaged to influencer Gabriela Versiani, who was previously in publicized relationships with Brazilian singer Kevinho, Brazilian soccer player Neymar Jr, Brazilian actor João Guilherme, Brazilian surfer Gabriel Medina and Brazilian sprinter Paulo Andre.

== Discography ==
=== Live albums (DVDs) ===
- Pra Ouvir Tomando Uma (2018)
- Ao Vivão (2020)
- Pra Ouvir Tomando Uma 2 (2021)
- Ao Vivão 2 (2021)
- Pra Ouvir Tomando Uma 3 (2022)
- Ao Vivão 3 (2022)
- Ao Vivo em Rio Preto (2023)
- Ao Vivo em Fortaleza (2024)
- Ao Vivão 4 (2024)
