= PEC Aviation =

Brazilian air taxi airline

IATA	ICAO	Call sign
—	—	—
- Founded: 2004; 22 years ago
- AOC #: 9,581 - October 21, 2022
- Headquarters: Goiânia, Brazil
- Website: www.voepec.com.br

PEC Aviation, formerly known as PEC Táxi Aéreo, is Brazilian air taxi and air ambulance operator based in Santa Genoveva Airport in Goiânia.

== History ==
Founded in 2004 by aviation and health industry veterans, PEC started its operation with only a Piper Arrow serving daily cargo flights from Macapá to Oiapoque. Due to Brazil's lack of prepared runways and poor jet fuel availability, PEC was the first company to certify the Piper Seneca (and its Embraer equivalents) for Medevac flights. In 2007, PEC moved its headquarters to Santa Genoveva Airport due to its central position in the country.

PEC's founder and current CEO is Captain Milton Arantes Costa, who is known for his advocacy of air taxi, authorized repair shops, and Brazilian aviation in general. Mr. Arantes Costa is the founding president of the Brazilian Association of Air Taxis (ABTAer) and member of ANAC’s Consulting Counsel.

== Fleet ==
PEC operates three Beechcraft King Air C90B, and two Cessna Grand Caravan C208B.

== Accident and incidents ==
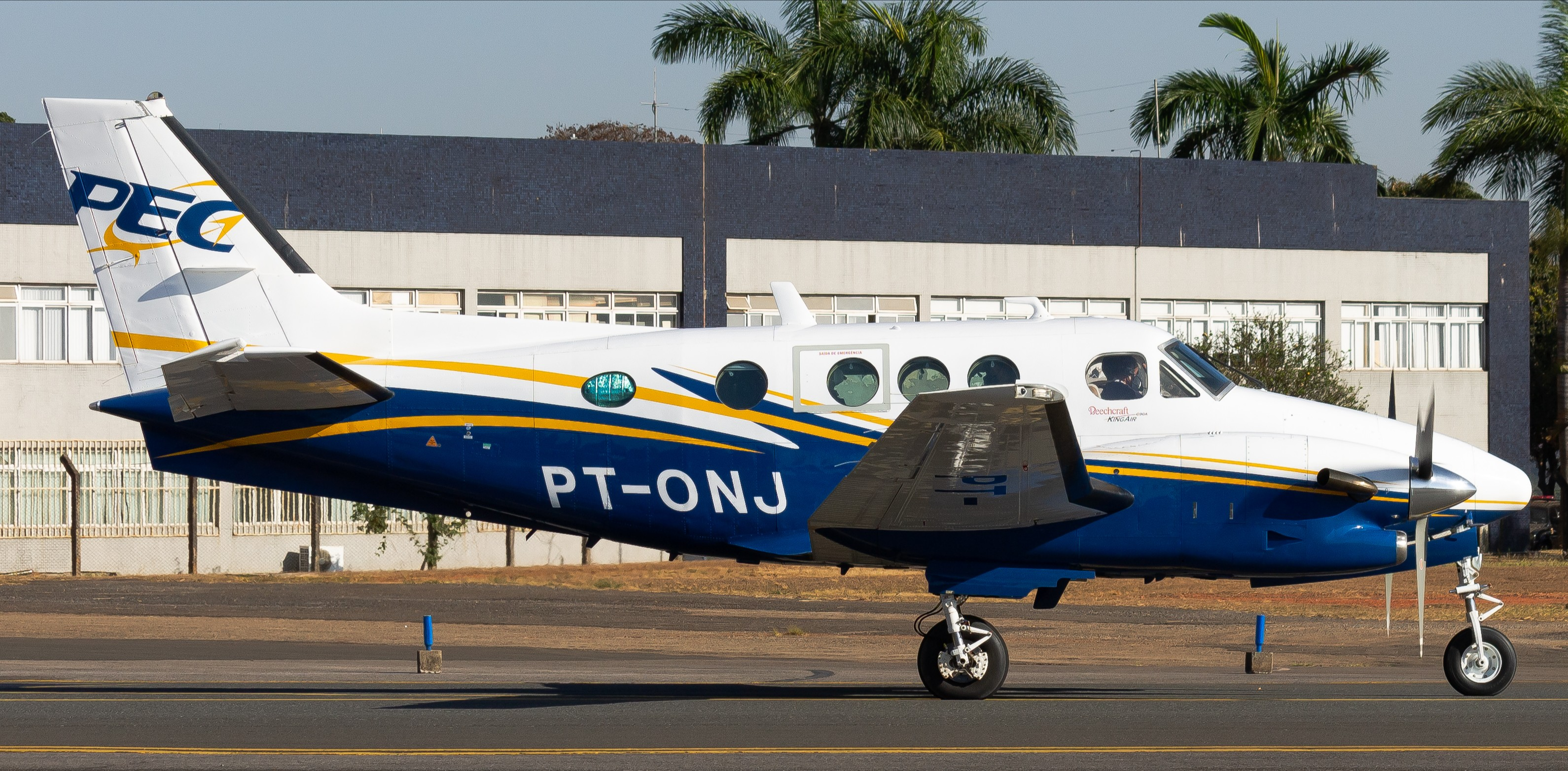

- November 5, 2021: a Beechcraft King Air registration PT-ONJ operating a chartered flight from Goiânia to Ubaporanga while on final approach crashed on a waterfall 4 km (2.5 mi) from the airport, in the municipality of Piedade de Caratinga. The crash killed all the occupants, being two crew members and three passengers, among them singer Marília Mendonça due to a concert in Caratinga on the same day. The cause of the accident was determined to be pilot error. Before hitting the ground, the aircraft hit high-voltage tower cables, which, according to pilot reports, had hindered landings in previous months.

== See also ==
- List of airlines of Brazil
