= Nosso Amor Envelheceu =

EP by Marília Mendonça
- Released: 2 July 2021
- Recorded: 17 October 2020
- Genre: Sertanejo
- Length: 16:46
- Label: Som Livre
- Producer: Eduardo Pepato

Marília Mendonça chronology
Patroas (2020)	Nosso Amor Envelheceu (2021)	Patroas 35% (2021)

Singles from Nosso Amor Envelheceu
- 1. "Deprê" Released: 14 December 2020; 2. "Foi por Conveniência" Released: 15 January 2021; 3. "Troca de Calçada" Released: 29 January 2021; 4. "Rosa Embriagada" Released: 30 April 2021

Nosso Amor Envelheceu is the sixth extended play (EP) by Marília Mendonça, released on 2 July 2021 by the record label Som Livre. It was the final solo work and EP released in her lifetime. The EP was recorded live in October 2020 during an online broadcast, featuring five tracks (all written by Mendonça herself), four of which were released as singles.

== Background and composition ==
Todos os Cantos (2019), Mendonça's previous work, differed from the singer's earlier works by not having an original repertoire. At the time, she told G1 that the themes she addressed, such as romantic betrayal, were making her a hostage to people's judgment: "Composing less has a lot to do with exposure. I've never talked about this fear, but it's very real."

When the COVID-19 pandemic developed in Brazil and the music industry came to a standstill, Mendonça promoted virtual concerts. One of them ended up becoming the collaborative album Patroas, produced with the duo Maiara & Maraisa, and which featured Mendonça's first original song in years, called "Quero Você do Jeito Que Quiser".

Nosso Amor Envelheceu was Mendonça's first self-penned work in years. Of the five songs, three were written solely by her, and the other two in collaboration with composers Juliano Tchula and Vitor Ferrari. In interaction with fans, Mendonça even said that the song "Our Love Has Grown Old" was inspired by the end of her engagement with businessman Yugnir Ângelo, with whom she did not have a peaceful breakup. In 2019, Mendonça also said that other compositions were based on other themes and readings she was doing. At the time, the artist was reading Individuality in an Age of Uncertainty, by Zygmunt Bauman.

"Troca de Calçada" takes a first-person approach to the issue of prostitution . The composition, which was one of the highlights of the project, received critical acclaim.

== Production ==
Nosso Amor Envelheceu was produced by Eduardo Pepato, who had previously worked with Mendonça. The EP was recorded during a live show on 17 October 2020. The performance, at the time, was called Vem Aí.

The EP's graphic design was inspired by artistic paintings. The single "Rosa Embriagada", for example, was inspired by Piet Mondrian's painting Amaryllis. The cover of the single "Troca de Calçada" was inspired by Vincent van Gogh's Café Terrace at Night, while the cover of the project was based on Pierre-Auguste Renoir's Bal du moulin de la Galette.

== Release and reception ==
Four of the five songs from Nosso Amor Envelheceu were released in advance between December 2020 and April 2021. The complete EP was released on 2 July 2021, distributed by the record label Som Livre.

The EP had a short run, with only one live show presented, in Sorocaba, in November 2021. With Mendonça's death, subsequent shows were cancelled.

== Track listing ==
No.	Title	Writer(s)	Length
1.	"Nosso Amor Envelheceu"	Marília Mendonça	3:34
2.	"Troca de Calçada"	Mendonça; Juliano Tchula; Vítor Ferrari	3:23
3.	"Rosa Embriagada"	Mendonça; Tchula	3:22
4.	"Deprê"	Mendonça	3:00
5.	"Foi por Conveniência"	Mendonça	3:25
Total length:			16:46
