= Patroas 35% =

Studio album by Marília Mendonça and Maiara & Maraisa
- Released: 14 October 2021
- Genre: Sertanejo
- Length: 29:51
- Label: Som Livre
- Producer: Eduardo Pepato

Marília Mendonça chronology
Nosso Amor Envelheceu (2021)	Patroas 35% (2021)	Decretos Reais (2023)

Maiara & Maraisa chronology
Incomparável (2021)	Patroas 35% (2021)	Identidade (2023)

Singles from Patroas 35%
- 1. "Motel Afrodite" Released: 21 September 2021; 2. "Não Sei o que Lá" Released: 22 September 2021

Patroas 35%, also called Festa das Patroas 35%, is the second and final collaborative studio album by Marília Mendonça and Maiara & Maraisa released on 14 October 2021 by the record label Som Livre. It was also the last album released by Mendonça during her lifetime.

Patroas 35% was recorded during an online broadcast, and featured unreleased and partly original material. Two singles were released for the album, "Motel Afrodite" and "Não Sei o que Lá", and it was a continuation of the Patroas project, a collaboration between the artists. In 2022, Patroas 35% was nominated for a Latin Grammy Award for Best Sertaneja Music Album.

"Patroas 35%" was defined by Mendonça and Maiara & Maraisa as "the work of their lives," with the goal of leading to a tour in 2022, after the COVID-19 pandemic in Brazil. However, Mendonça died in a plane crash less than a month after the album's release.

== Background and recording ==
In 2020, Marília Mendonça and Maiara & Maraísa released the album Patroas. The work was based on an online broadcast and was a continuation of a partnership between the performers that had lasted for years. With signs that the COVID-19 pandemic was beginning to show signs of improvement in Brazil, Mendonça decided to release the EP Nosso Amor Envelheceu and, at the same time, decided to produce a sequel to Patroas, this time with unreleased material. In 2021, Maiara & Maraisa also released the album Incomparável.

Patroas 35% featured unreleased material and was produced by Eduardo Pepato, a frequent collaborator of Mendonça. During a press conference, Mendonça explained the album title: "the number in the project name is so that our fans understand that we will be back, that this tour will literally be only 35% of the execution of this project that is so big and so eagerly awaited by everyone, because you deserve more, and so do we".

== Release and reception ==
Patroas 35% was divided into three release stages. The album, in its entirety, was released on 14 October 2021. Two singles had already been released, and the last track was "Esqueça-Me Se For Capaz". The work yielded the music video "Esqueça-Me Se For Capaz". The video for the song "Fã Clube" was released on 5 November, hours before Mendonça died.

To promote the album, the duo held a press conference at Allianz Parque in São Paulo. On that occasion, the performers announced that a tour would be held in 2022, with dates already scheduled in several locations in Brazil, such as Rio de Janeiro, Brasília and Belo Horizonte. With Mendonça's death, however, the plans did not come into fruition.

On 17 June 2022, the album was renamed Festa das Patroas 35%, after the courts prohibited the use of the name "Patroas" because it was too similar to the name of the band "A Patroa". Journalist and critic Mauro Ferreira commented on the case, stating that "records should have their titles protected because, ultimately, they are works of art and need to be preserved as such. And this includes, in addition to the title, the cover. Having to change the cover of a record in reissues, as has happened several times due to legal issues, is to tarnish an essential part of the work."

== Track listing ==
No.	Title	Writer(s)	Length
1.	"Esqueça-Me Se For Capaz"	Dê Angelo; Júnior Gomes; Thales Lessa; Matheus Santos; Renno Poeta	2:49
2.	"Todo Mundo Menos Você"	Marília Mendonça; Maiara; Maraisa	3:26
3.	"Motel Afrodite"	Henrique Casttro; Elvis Elan; Douglas Cezar	2:50
4.	"Não Sei o que Lá"	Angelo; Rodrigo Nu12; Lessa; Kaique e Felipe	2:49
5.	"Presepada"	Mendonça; Maraisa	3:16
6.	"Para de Me Chamar pra Trair"	Flavinho Tinto; Douglas Melo; Nando Max; Elcio di Carvalho; Jr. Pepato	3:27
7.	"Fã Clube"	Rafaela Miranda; Kito; Isabella Resende; Gustavo Martins	2:51
8.	"Você não Manda em Mim"	Dom Vittor; Ikaro; João Gustavo Dias; Matheus Araujo; Rodrigo	2:29
9.	"Eu Não Vou Namorar"	Diego Silveira; Heitor Ramos; Pepato; Lari Ferreira	2:51
Total length:			29:51
