= Bebaça =

Song by Marília Mendonça and Maiara & Maraisa

from the album Todos os Cantos Vol. 1
- Language: Portuguese
- Recorded: December 5, 2018
- Genre: Sertanejo
- Length: 2:55.
- Label: Som Livre
- Composers: Gustavo Martins, Murilo Huff, Rafael Augusto, Ricardo Vismarck, Ronael
- Producer: Eduardo Pepato

Todos os Cantos Vol. 1 track listing
- 1. "Ciumeira"; 2. "Sem Sal"; 3. "Bem Pior Que Eu"; 4. "Casa da Mãe Joana (canção)|Casa da Mãe Joana"; 5. "Bye Bye (canção de Marília Mendonça)|Bye Bye"; 6. "Bebi Liguei"; 7. "Passa Mal"; 8. "Amigo Emprestado"; 9. "Sabiá"; 10. "Bebaça"; 11. "Obrigado por Estragar Tudo"; 12. "Love à Queima Roupa"

"Bebaça" is a song by Brazilian singer and songwriter Marília Mendonça featuring Maiara & Maraisa, released in 2019 by Som Livre label as part of the album Todos os Cantos Vol. 1.

== Composition ==
Like other songs from the Todos os Cantos project, "Bebaça" is not a copyrighted song. Its composers are Gustavo Martins, Murilo Huff, Rafael Augusto, Ricardo Vismarck and Ronael. The song is about alcoholism, centered around the story of a drunk woman at a party.

== Recording ==
The song was recorded live on December 5, 2018, at Parque das Águas in Cuiabá, the capital of the state of Mato Grosso. The presentation took place during the night, after the singer delivered flyers around the city center along with Maiara & Maraisa and talked to fans. Despite the fact that the recordings by Marília were already known at the time, the participation of Maiara & Maraisa was a surprise for the live audience.

== Launch and reception ==
"Bebaça" was released online in 2019 as part of the album Todos os Cantos Vol. 1. Despite not being a single, the video version of the song reached over 5 million views in about five days.

In 2020, "Bebaça" received a double diamond record from Pro-Música Brasil.

== Certifications ==
Certifications for "Bebaça"
Region	Certification	Certified units/sales
Brazil (Pro-Música Brasil)	3× Diamond	900,000^{‡}
^{‡} Sales+streaming figures based on certification alone.
