= Ávine Vinny =

Brazilian singer and composer

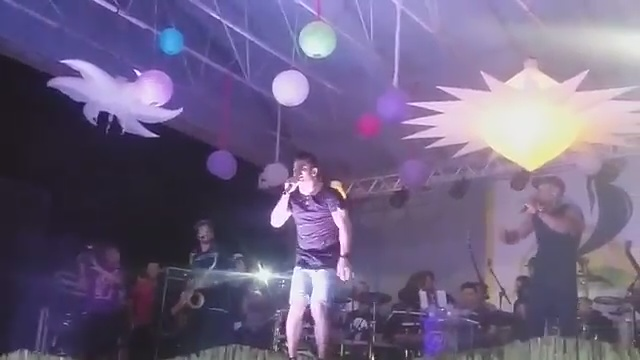
- Vinny at the festival in Paulo Ramos, Maranhão

Background information
- Born: Ávneh Vinny Diniz da Silva Aragão; July 14, 1989 (age 36); Sobral, Ceará, Brazil
- Genres: Forró
- Occupations: Singer, composer
- Instruments: Voice, guitar
- Years active: 2009–present
- Label: Sony Music
- Website: avinevinny.com.br

Ávneh Vinny Diniz da Silva Aragão (Sobral, Ceará, July 14, 1989), known as Ávine Vinny, (Note: The stage name of Vinny has changed over time. He began his career as Ávneh, however, several times was referred to as Avneh, without the acute accent, and even as Avnéh in October 2015. In December of the same year he announced the change to the name Ávine. The same stated in his social network that the change was for "followers and fans to find easily" and joked: “born with a difficult name”. However, several times was written Avine, without accent. In postings from October 2018 the name started to be accentuated again.) is a Brazilian singer and composer. He began his career in 2009 by creating with his friends the band Xé Pop. In 2016, he began his solo career. His last album, Avine Naturalmente, was recorded in October 2018, in Porto de Galinhas.

== Biography ==
Vinny was born on July 14, 1989, in Sobral, Ceará. The same is the son of Maria do Socorro Silva. Its baptismal name, Ávneh, has Jewish origin and was given by its mother. He began singing at the age of 12 in the church, where he remained for six years. Already in majority, began to sing in local bars.

At the age of 20, Vinny and his friends formed the band Xé Pop. The following year they released "Namorar Escondido", which was re-recorded by Wesley Safadão, Babado Novo, among other artists. In six years in the group, the songs "Primeiro Olhar", "Você Aparece", "Segura Coração", "Melhor Que Eu", "Meu Abrigo" and "Vai Novinha" were released. After great repercussion, he moved to Fortaleza.

In 2015, he released a trilogy of video clips. "Você Aparece", "Eu e Você" and "Se Você Quer Saber" were recorded in tourist spots in Rio de Janeiro, such as Christ the Redeemer, Copacabana and Selaron Steps. In 2016, the singer left the band. In an interview with the G1, he said that the group created a "characteristic of its own", that its name "is very strong and we will take advantage to exploit it better and demystify".

With A3 Entretenimento, he released the album O Cara Do Momento in July 2016. "Tô Limpando Você da Minha Vida", in partnership with Solange Almeida, became the fourth most performed music in the northeastern radio stations. In February 2017, he released the album Na Contramão, which contains the presence of Xandy Avião, Márcio Victor and Léo Santana. The album features nine songs.

In the same year he released Acústico and Férias com Avine, in May and August respectively; The first counts with nine tracks, while the next seven. The video for "Acabou, Morreu" reached over one million views on YouTube. In August 2018, he released the album A Queda Foi na Sua Cama which contains four tracks. In September, in partnership with funk singer Ludmilla, released the single "Tô Fechado Com Ela". In October 2018, he recorded the album Avine Naturalmente at Porto de Galinhas, Pernambuco.

The single "Maturidade", in partnership with the duo Matheus & Kauan, reached the 66th position of the top 100 list of Spotify Brazil, besides occupy the 30th position of the list of viral hits, surpassing the singers Madonna and Selena Gomez. On its YouTube channel, the clip, released in November, outnumbers 12 million views.

== Personal life ==
Vinny is an evangelical and declared that he always prays before going on stage. He is the father of Isla Aragão, along with a nurse, Laís Holanda. The same has several tattoos: A microphone cable on the right arm, which binds to another tattoo, heartbeats, on the chest; the phrase "my music, my voice comes from the sky" and a microphone in the left arm; the phrase "turning boredom into melody" on the left side of the thorax; and a microphone, a guitar, a saxophone and a battery in the right calf.

== Controversies ==
In 2017, Sony Music removed from YouTube the video clip of the song "Whisky, Cigarro e Violão". The reason alleged by the record company was the granting of copyright to another singer, Israel Novaes. The composer stated that the song was granted for both, but in different musical genres; Vinny would record it as forró and Novas as sertanejo. Armando Carneiro, Vinny's manager, said that the composer gave "a year of exclusivity under music. In the document itself he says that we can change the rhythm of the phonogram. Nothing prevents us from recording at whatever pace. This gender exclusivity does not exist". The singer Israel Novaes, after being criticized in his social networks, said that "it is very sad to be right, acting right and ill-intentioned and uninformed people criticize".

== Discography ==
Year	Song	Album
2015	"Você Aparece"	Song without album
2015	"Eu e Você"	Song without album
2015	"Se Você Quer Saber"	Song without album
2016	"O Cara do Momento"	O Cara Do Momento
2016	"Que Pena Que Acabou"	O Cara Do Momento
2016	"Quem Quer Fazer Amor"	O Cara Do Momento
2016	"Solteiro de Novo"	O Cara Do Momento
2016	"Tô Limpando Você da Minha Vida"	O Cara Do Momento
2016	"Vida de Playboy"	O Cara Do Momento
2017	"Então Vai"	Na Contramão
2017	"Nasci Pra Ser Puteiro"	Na Contramão
2017	"Acabou, morreu"	Na Contramão
2017	"Whisky Cigarro E Violão"	Na Contramão
2017	"Fala Pro Papai"	Na Contramão
2017	"Isso Vai Até Quando?"	Na Contramão
2017	"Beco Sem Saída"	Na Contramão
2017	"Sem Frescurinha"	Na Contramão
2017	"Tapa na Cara Não Dói"	Férias Com Avine
2017	"Eu Só Quero é Você"	Férias Com Avine
2018	"A Gente Tinha Tudo pra Dar Certo"	A Queda Foi na Sua Cama
2018	"A Queda Foi na Sua Cama"	A Queda Foi na Sua Cama
2018	"Amor de Fachada"	A Queda Foi na Sua Cama
2018	"Onde a Bebida Mora"	A Queda Foi na Sua Cama
2018	"Tô Fechado Com Ela"	Song without album
2018	"Eu Não Presto"	Song without album
2018	"Maturidade"	Avine Naturalmente
2019	"Agarrado ao Travesseiro"	Avine Naturalmente
2019	"Boa Sorte"	Avine Naturalmente
2019	"Bomba Relógio"	Avine Naturalmente
2019	"Chamada De Amor"	Avine Naturalmente
2019	"Bloqueia, Desbloqueia"	Avine Naturalmente
2019	"Me Precipitei"	Avine Naturalmente
2019	"Só Deu Você"	Avine Naturalmente
2019	"Kit Depressão"	Avine Naturalmente
2019	"Amor Fuleragem"	Avine Naturalmente
2019	"Chora Bebê"	Avine Naturalmente
2019	"Volta Vai"	Avine Naturalmente
