= Marília Mendonça =

Brazilian singer and songwriter (1995–2021)

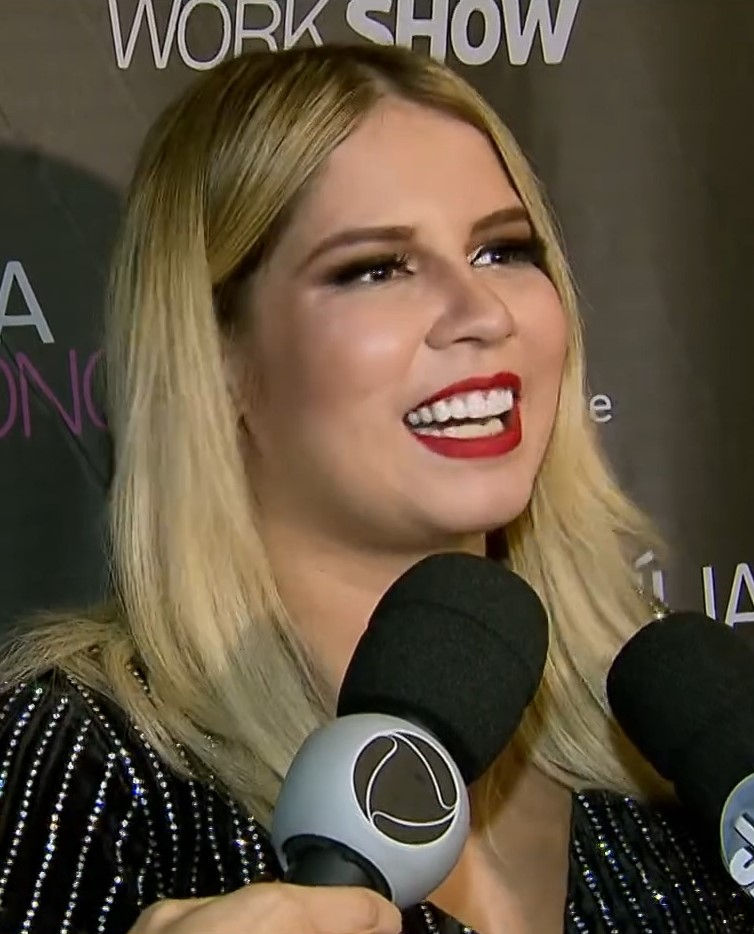
- Mendonça in 2018
- Born: Marília Dias Mendonça; 22 July 1995; Cristianópolis, Goiás, Brazil
- Died: 5 November 2021 (aged 26); Piedade de Caratinga, Minas Gerais, Brazil
- Cause of death: Plane crash
- Resting place: Goiânia Memorial Park Cemetery, Goiânia, Goiás, Brazil
- Other names: Queen of Sertanejo; Queen of Heartbreak
- Occupations: Singer; songwriter; instrumentalist
- Years active: 2011–2021
- Partner(s): Yugnir Ângelo (2015–2017); Murilo Huff (2018–2021)
- Children: 1
- Musical career
- Genres: Sertanejo; bachata; arrocha
- Instruments: Vocals; guitar
- Label: Som Livre

Marília Dias Mendonça (Brazilian Portuguese: [maˈɾiljɐ mẽˈdõsɐ]; 22 July 1995 – 5 November 2021) was a Brazilian singer, songwriter, and instrumentalist. Recognized as one of the defining voices of sertanejo music, her contributions to female empowerment revolutionized the genre throughout the 2010s and 2020s.

In 2015, Mendonça released her self-titled debut EP, but she only rose to prominence after releasing her first self-titled DVD in 2016, which earned triple-platinum certification for sales of 240,000 copies. The song "Infiel", included on the album, became one of the most-played songs in Brazil and received a triple-diamond certification, bringing Mendonça national recognition.

Her second album, Realidade, was released in 2017 and received a Latin Grammy nomination in the Best Sertanejo Music Album category. In 2019, she released Todos os Cantos, a scripted project featuring concerts recorded by the singer in every state capital in Brazil. The album received triple-platinum certification for sales of 240,000 copies and earned the performer her first Latin Grammy Award, which she won in the Best Sertanejo Music Album category.

The single "Leão", from the posthumous album Decretos Reais, received a six-times-diamond certification, equivalent to 360 million streams. Mendonça died on 5 November 2021 in a fatal plane crash in Piedade de Caratinga, Minas Gerais, a town neighbouring Caratinga, where she was due to perform a concert.

== Early life ==
Marília Dias Mendonça was born on 22 July 1995 at the Municipal Hospital of Cristianópolis, in the interior of the state of Goiás. The delivery was marked by severe medical complications resulting from pre-eclampsia suffered by her mother, Ruth Dias, which placed both mother and daughter at high risk of death during the caesarean section. Shortly after her birth, her family moved to the state capital, Goiânia, where she was raised and spent her entire childhood and adolescence.

Mendonça's childhood was marked by severe socioeconomic vulnerability. Her mother had experienced significant hardship, having been raised in an orphanage and boarding school from the age of four to fifteen. To support Mendonça and, later, her younger son, João Gustavo (born in 2001), Ruth worked in a snack bar and at a local bakery. During periods of greater financial hardship, the family's daily food depended on bread provided by the owner of the establishment where Ruth worked.

Mendonça's parents, Mário Mendonça and Ruth Dias, separated when she was still a child. Years later, in 2011, when Mendonça was 16, her father died of cancer after undergoing treatment at Hospital Araújo Jorge in Goiânia.

Her contact with the arts began at an early age: at seven, she wrote a poem for her mother, showing the first signs of her aptitude for writing. Religion played a central role in her musical development, with her first performances taking place during services at the Evangelical Assembly of God Church. Noticing his granddaughter's interest, her paternal grandfather gave her her first guitar and paid for her initial lessons. However, after only two formal lessons, Marília began developing her musical skills as a self-taught musician. At the age of 12, she began composing her own songs, including the track "Minha Herança", which was later recorded and released by the sertanejo duo João Neto & Frederico.

== Career ==
=== 2011–2016: Marília Mendonça ===
Mendonça started her career as a singer in January 2014, with her first eponymous EP. In June 2015, the song "Impasse" was released, Mendonça's first single which featured the duo Henrique & Juliano. In March 2016, Mendonça released her first live album called Marília Mendonça: Ao Vivo featuring singles such as "Sentimento Louco" and "Infiel" with the participation of Henrique & Juliano. Infiel became the fifth most played song on Brazilian radio that year, and Mendonça began to gain national recognition. In October, a live acoustic EP entitled Agora É Que São Elas was released with previous successful tracks and had its only single with the song "Eu Sei de Cor".

=== 2017–2018: Realidade and Agora É Que São Elas ===
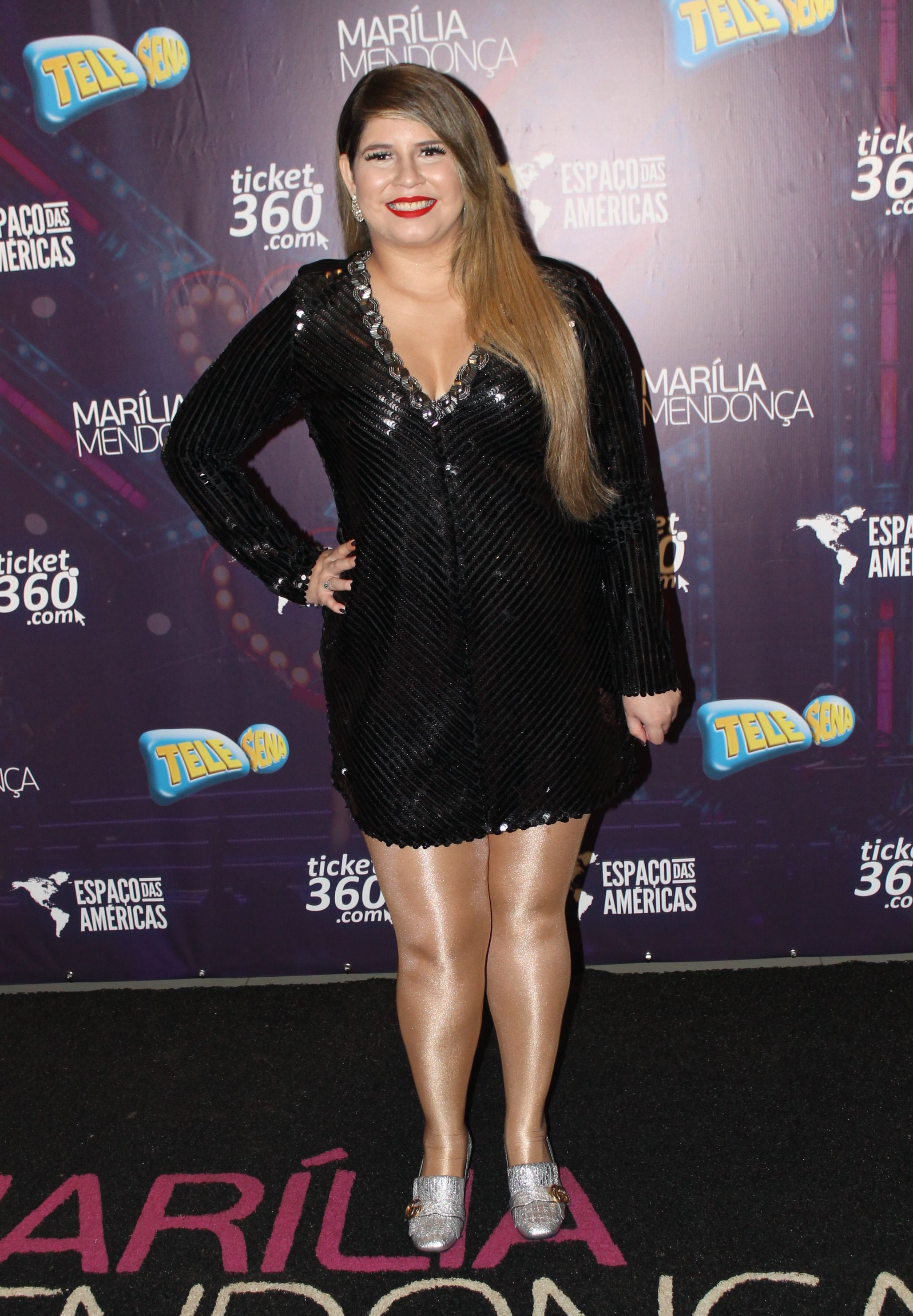
Mendonça in 2018

In January 2017, Mendonça released another eponymous EP with four new tracks. In March, her second album was released entitled Realidade, which had singles such as "Amante Não Tem Lar" and "De Quem É A Culpa" again featuring the duo Henrique & Juliano. In November, she released the single "Transplante" in partnership with duo Bruno & Marrone. In July, Mendonça won the post of the most listened to Brazilian artist on YouTube, ranking 13th in the world ranking.

In April 2018, she released the album entitled Agora É Que São Elas 2, in collaboration with the duo Maiara & Maraisa. The album features the songs "Ausência" and "Estranho", in addition to "A Culpa é Dele".

=== 2019–2021: Patroas e Todos os Cantos ===
In February 2019, the first part of Mendonça's third live album, entitled Todos os Cantos, was released; singles in this album included the songs "Ciumeira", "Bem Pior Que Eu", "Todo Mundo Vai Sofrer" and "Supera". In March, Spotify announced that Mendonça was number one in the Top 10 of the most listened to women in Brazil of the streaming service. In May, the second part of the album Todos os Cantos was released. The third and final part of the live album was released in August. In 2019, Todos os Cantos won the Latin Grammy Award for Best Sertaneja Music Album. In 2019, the streaming service GloboPlay released a four-episode documentary about the album's preparation and tour.

In January 2020, Mendonça released the single "Graveto". In February, she released another single "Tentativas". In May, her third single of the year "Vira Homem" was released. In September, she released the album titled Patroas, in partnership with the duo Maiara & Maraisa. The album features unreleased compositions by the singers and re-recordings of their greatest hits. Their songs included "Quero Você do Jeito Que Quiser", "10 de Setembro" and "Coração Bandido". In 2021, it was nominated for a Latin Grammy Award for Best Sertaneja Music Album. On 22 August 2021, singer Luísa Sonza released a remix of the song "Best Sozinha" featuring Mendonça.

In October 2021, Mendonça released a studio album titled Patroas 35%, another collaboration with the duo Maiara & Maraisa. The album features the songs "Todo Mundo Menos Você", "Esqueça-Me Se For Capaz" and "Motel Afrodite".

== Personal life ==
In March 2015, Mendonça dated businessman Yugnir Ângelo, with whom she became engaged in December 2016. She ended the relationship in August 2017, stating she was too young for such a commitment. After maintaining casual relationships, in May 2019 she revealed she had been in a serious relationship for five months with fellow singer and songwriter Murilo Huff. The couple got engaged and moved in together. In June the same year, she confirmed that she was pregnant, giving birth to her son Léo, born eight weeks premature, on 16 December 2019, in Goiânia. In July 2025, Murilo Huff, father of Leo (Marília Mendonça's son), filed for sole custody of his son. He seeks sole custody of Leo, who lives with his maternal grandmother, Dona Ruth, in shared custody since the singer's death in 2021. The case is being processed under court secrecy, and both Murilo and Dona Ruth request respect and discretion regarding the child's image and privacy.

Murilo Huff, through his law firm, stated that his desire is to fully exercise his role as a father, raising his son with greater closeness, but that this does not mean separating him from his maternal family, according to journalist Leo Dias. He also emphasized that he requested sole custody due to recent "discoveries" that have shaken him, but cannot reveal further details due to court secrecy.

During the break of her Side B live show, on 8 August 2020, Mendonça mentioned a gay nightclub in Goiânia called Diesel, where one of her band's musicians had kissed "the most beautiful woman in his life", according to her. In addition, other members of the band chuckled and made unspoken comments, implying that the boy would have hooked up with a transsexual woman. The singer's comments had a negative impact on social networks and raised the hashtag #MaríliaTransfóbica on Twitter. On 10 August, Mendonça spoke on Twitter and admitted the mistake, where she apologized for the jokes and acknowledged that her mistake was unjustifiable.

== Death ==
On 5 November 2021, Mendonça embarked on an air taxi with four other people on board towards Caratinga, Minas Gerais, Brazil, where she was expected to perform in a local concert. The plane crashed, killing Mendonça, her uncle (who was also her manager), her producer, and two crew members. All five deaths were officially confirmed shortly after on a live coverage by TV Globo. Her death attracted national and international media attention. Several artists mourned her death and paid their respects on social media, including Anitta, Luísa Sonza, Dulce María, Gal Costa, Roberta Miranda, Gilberto Gil, Ivete Sangalo, Pabllo Vittar, and Manuel Abud, CEO of the Latin Recording Academy.

After her death, Mendonça became the most listened-to artist in global streaming with 28.6 million streams; 74 of her songs appeared in Spotify's Top 200 in Brazil.

=== Funeral ===
With the exception of the pilot and co-pilot, the victims' bodies left the funeral home in Caratinga, at dawn on 6 November. In the morning, the bodies of Mendonça and Silveira arrived in Goiânia. An open casket service for them took place at Goiânia Arena in Goiânia later that day. Their private funeral was held at 9:00 am, restricted to family members; it later opened to the public at 1:00 pm, and fans were allowed to pay their respects. It was estimated that more than 100,000 people passed through the arena. The funeral procession began at 5:30 pm, with the bodies being buried at Cemitério Parque Memorial in Goiânia.

== Posthumous releases ==
=== 2022–2025: Decretos Reais ===
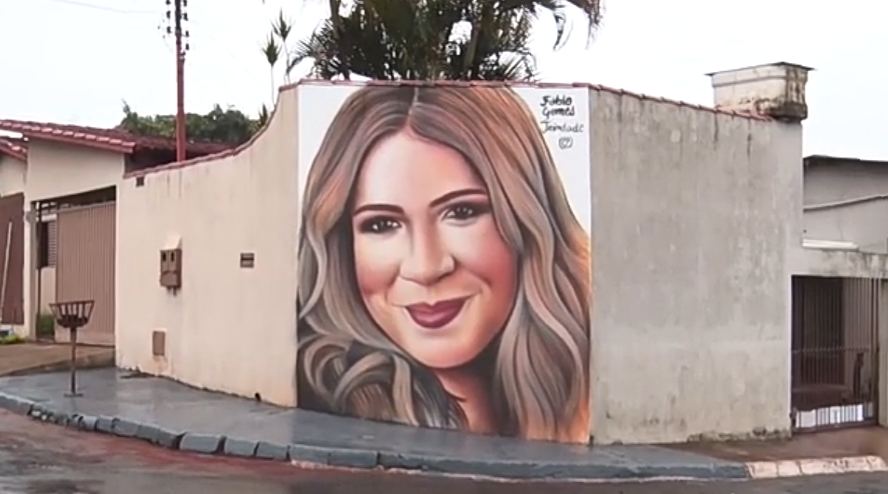
Mendonça's painting drawn on a wall.

After Mendonça's death, songs that she had recorded with other artists were released, such as "Amigos con Derechos" with Mexican singer Dulce María, "50 por Cento" with singer Naiara Azevedo, "Amava Nada" with singer Lucas Lucco, "Calculista" with duo Dom Vittor & Gustavo and "Mal Feito" with duo Hugo & Guilherme.

On 21 July 2022, Mendonça's first posthumous EP titled Decretos Reais, Vol. 1 was released. Mendonça's second posthumous EP, Decretos Reais, Vol. 2, was released on 9 December 2022. Mendonça's team released a third EP titled Decretos Reais, Vol. 3 on 14 March 2023. In May, the album Decretos Reais was released, featuring all the tracks from the EPs plus one more. The song "Leão", which Mendonça re-recorded in her most recent project, became the most played Portuguese-language song in just one day on Spotify.

Through the social media of Mendonça's mother, Dona Ruth, it was announced that the streaming service Amazon Prime Video will make a film about the singer's story. It was also said that the platform could release a sequence of up to three projects.

In December 2025, Mendonça's team released the live album "Decretos Reais-Lado B" with songs takern from her online broadcast Lado B.

=== 2026–present: Manuscritos ===
In October 2025, as part of the "Manuscritos" project, Mendonça's team released the previously released single "Segundo Amor da Sua Vida", composed and recorded by her in 2018. In January 2026, another previously unreleased single was released as part of the aforementioned project "Você Me Fez Odiar o Carnaval", recorded by Mendonça shortly before her death. On 22 July, the date Mendonça would have turned 31, as part of the project, another single was released, using the demo tape she had recorded with the name "Tudo Vai Ficar Bem"

On 22 April 2026, the EP Manuscritos, Capítulo I, was released on digital platforms, featuring six tracks, most of which were previously unreleased in Mendonça's voice. The EP brings together versions recorded by Mendonça originally released by other artists, such as "Cuida Bem Dela" and "Flor e o Beija-Flor", in addition to "Foi por Conveniência", previously released by the singer herself.

In July 2026, the official title of the film, Marília, was revealed, and it was announced that Marina Versos would play the singer.

== Legacy ==
Mendonça is recognized as the leader of the musical subgenre feminejo — sertanejo music that emphasizes women – and her contribution to female empowerment. The singer revolutionized the sertanejo scene between the 2010s and 2020s. She was often called the queen of sofrência, for her soulful, angst-filled ballads.

=== Recognition ===
Mendonça continues to be remembered in numerous tributes and memorials. At the 64th Annual Grammy Awards, she appeared in the Memoriam segment, in which tributes are paid to people related to the music industry who died during the course of the year, appearing in this section of the award a photo of the artist side by side with Taylor Hawkins and Stephen Sondheim.

To immortalize the history of Mendonça, the Mercado da 74 de Goiânia began to carry her name since 21 October 2022, becoming the Mercado Popular Cultural Center of Rua 74 Marília Mendonça. In Caratinga, the city where Mendonça was going to perform at the time of her accident, the singer has been honored annually on the date she died, and is in the process of changing the name of the João da Costa Mafra Exhibition Park to Marília Mendonça and João da Costa Mafra Exhibition Park. Singer Emely Rodrigues also paid homage to Mendonça during the celebrations of São João, in Salvador, Bahia. The sertanejo duo Henrique & Juliano also honored Mendonça on the occasion of their DVD recording in the United States, moving the Times Square audience.

== Discography ==
- Marilia Mendonça (2016)
- Realidade (2017)
- Agora É Que São Elas 2 (with Maiara & Maraisa) (2018)
- Todos os Cantos (2019)
- Patroas (with Maiara & Maraisa (2020)
- Nosso Amor Envelheceu (2021)
- Patroas 35% (with Maiara & Maraisa) (2021)
- Decretos Reais (2023)
- Decretos Reais - Lado B (2025)
- Manuscritos (2026)

== Filmography ==
Year	Title	Role	Notes
2017	A Força do Querer	Herself	Special Participation
2019	Marília Mendonça - Todos os Cantos	Herself	Documentary
2026	Coração Acelerado	Herself	Archive footage
