= Victor & Leo =

Brazilian sertanejo duo

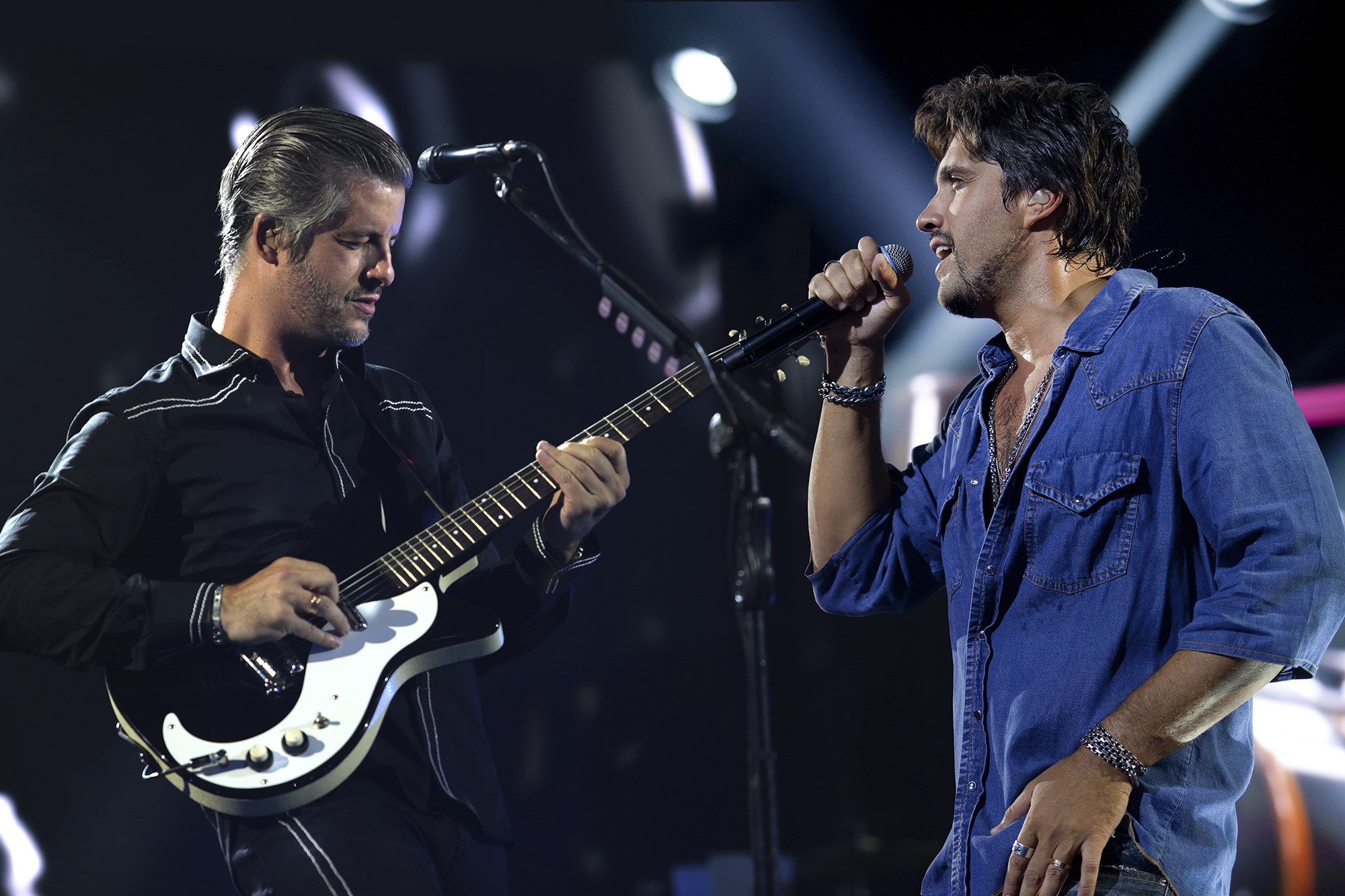
Victor (left) & Leo (right)

Victor & Leo are a Brazilian sertanejo duo made up of the brothers Vitor Chaves Zapalá Pimentel (b. 15 April 1975) and Leonardo Chaves Zapalá Pimentel (b. 4 October 1976).

Both brothers were born in Ponte Nova, but grew up in Uberlândia in the region of Cerrado, Minas Gerais.

Their first live album, entitled Victor & Leo Ao Vivo, was released in 2006, bringing them into the public eye with their first successful singles "Fada", "Vida Boa" and "Amigo Apaixonado". According to the ABPD, the album went double-platinum, meaning that more than 200,000 CDs have been sold in Brazil.

Since then, the duo have enjoyed a successful career, with two of their albums and one of their DVDs winning Diamond certification. In 2013 they won the Latin Grammy Award for Best Sertaneja Music Album with their album Ao Vivo em Floripa, and have received five nominations for a Latin Grammy Award.

Their most successful album is considered to be their third studio album, Borboletas, which attained a Diamond certification, having sold more than 500,000 copies. It contains their number one hit of the same name, as well as "Deus e Eu No Sertão" and "Tem Que Ser Você", which also reached number one.

In 2015, their album Irmãos was nominated for the 16th Latin Grammy Awards in the Best Sertaneja Music Album category.
