= Piedade de Caratinga =

- Municipality
- Motto(s): Cuidando da cidade, Trabalhando pra você
- Location in Brazil
- Coordinates: 19°45′32″S 42°4′33″W
- Country: Brazil
- Region: Southeast
- State: Minas Gerais
- Mesoregion: Vale do Rio Doce

Area
  - Total: 42,218 sq mi (109,345 km^{2})

Population (2020)
  - Total: 8,702
  - Density: 16,840/sq mi (6,502/km^{2})
- Time zone: UTC−3 (BRT)

Piedade de Caratinga is a municipality in the state of Minas Gerais in the Southeast region of Brazil. On November 5th, 2021, Marília Mendonça and four others died when their plane crashed into a rocky area inside the municipality. None of the 5 people on board survived

== See also ==
- List of municipalities in Minas Gerais
