= Paulo Ramos, Maranhão =

Coordinates: 4°13′S 45°11′W

- Municipality
- Flag Coat of arms
- Interactive map of Paulo Ramos, Maranhão
- Country: Brazil
- Region: Nordeste
- State: Maranhão
- Mesoregion: Oeste Maranhense

Population (2020)
  - Total: 21,066
- Time zone: UTC−3 (BRT)

Paulo Ramos, Maranhão is a municipality in the state of Maranhão in the Northeast region of Brazil.

== See also ==
- List of municipalities in Maranhão
