= São José dos Quatro Marcos =

Coordinates: 15.6208°S 58.1758°W

- Municipality
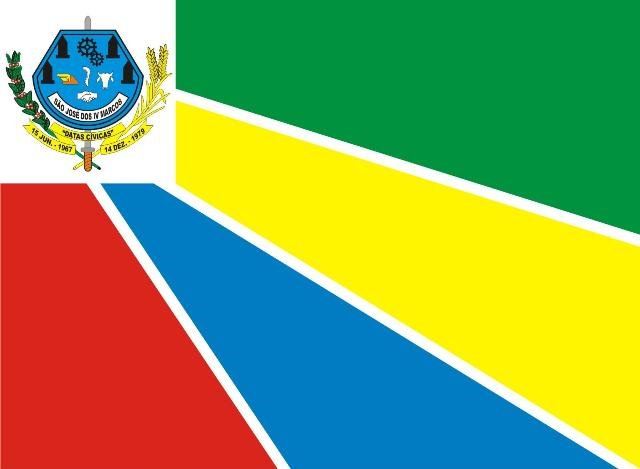
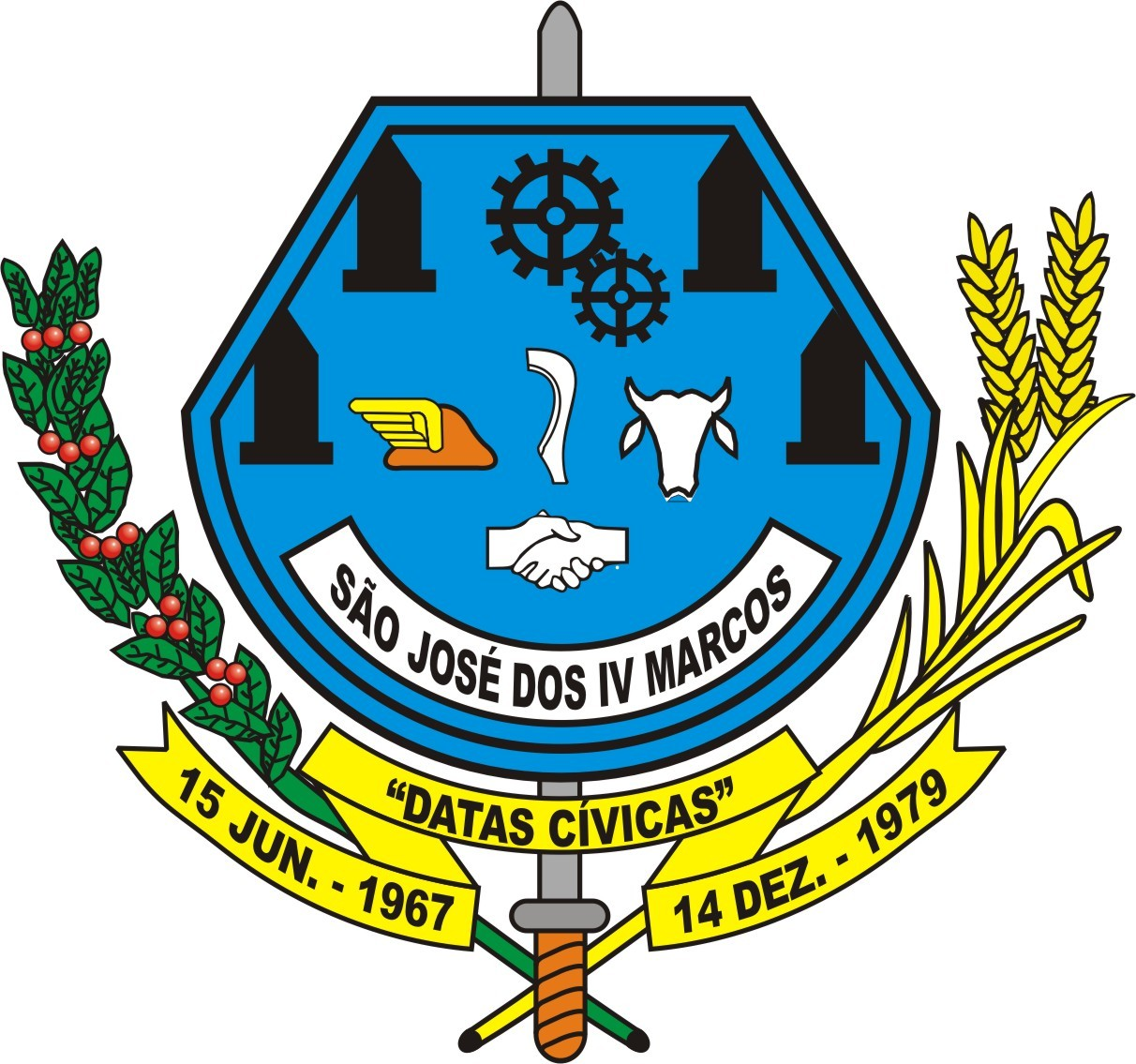
- Flag Coat of arms

- Country: Brazil
- Region: Southeast
- State: Mato Grosso
- Mesoregion: Sudoeste Mato-Grossense

Population (2020)
  - Total: 18,846
- Time zone: UTC−3 (BRT)

São José dos Quatro Marcos is a municipality in the state of Mato Grosso in the Central-West Region of Brazil.

== See also ==
- List of municipalities in Mato Grosso
