= Leão (Marília Mendonça song) =

2020 song by Marília Mendonça

Song by Xamã and Marília Mendonça

from the album Zodíaco
- Released: December 14, 2020
- Genre: Trap-soul
- Length: 3:30
- Label: Bagua Records
- Composer: Xamã
- Producer: Neo Beats

Music video
- "Leão" on YouTube

"Leão"

Single by Marília Mendonça

from the album Decretos Reais
- Released: December 9, 2022
- Recorded: May 9, 2021
- Genre: Brega
- Length: 2:46
- Label: Som Livre
- Composer: Xamã
- Producers: Júnior Campi, Elvis Tcherr

Music video
- "Leão" on YouTube

Leão (Portuguese for "lion") is a song by the Brazilian rapper Xamã with the participation of Marília Mendonça, it was originally released in the album Zodíaco.

== Composition ==
The song is part of the album Zodíaco, whose tracks are based on Zodiac sighs. The most famous song of the album in views is "Leão", whose video with Mendonça now had more than 45 million views on YouTube.

== Re-recording ==
During a live performance, Mendonça presented a new recording of the song, this time with an arrocha arrangement. After the death of the singer, the team decided to put this version on the first posthumous album of the singer, called Decretos Reais. This re-recording was originally released on late 2022 and became a viral hit on social media like TikTok, and was also on the Spotify Global chart.

The re-recording ended up being a commercial success and it was certified twelve-times Diamond by the Pro-Música Brasil in 2026. The music video of this song has also received over 450 million views on YouTube.

== Charts ==
Chart (2023)	Peak position
Brazil (Billboard)	1
Global 200 (Billboard)	51
Portugal (AFP)	29

== Certifications ==
Certifications for "Leão"
Region	Certification	Certified units/sales
Brazil (Pro-Música Brasil)	12× Diamond	3,600,000^{‡}
Portugal (AFP)	Platinum	10,000^{‡}
^{‡} Sales+streaming figures based on certification alone.

== See also ==
- List of best-selling singles in Brazil
