= Roberta Miranda =

Brazilian singer (born 1956)

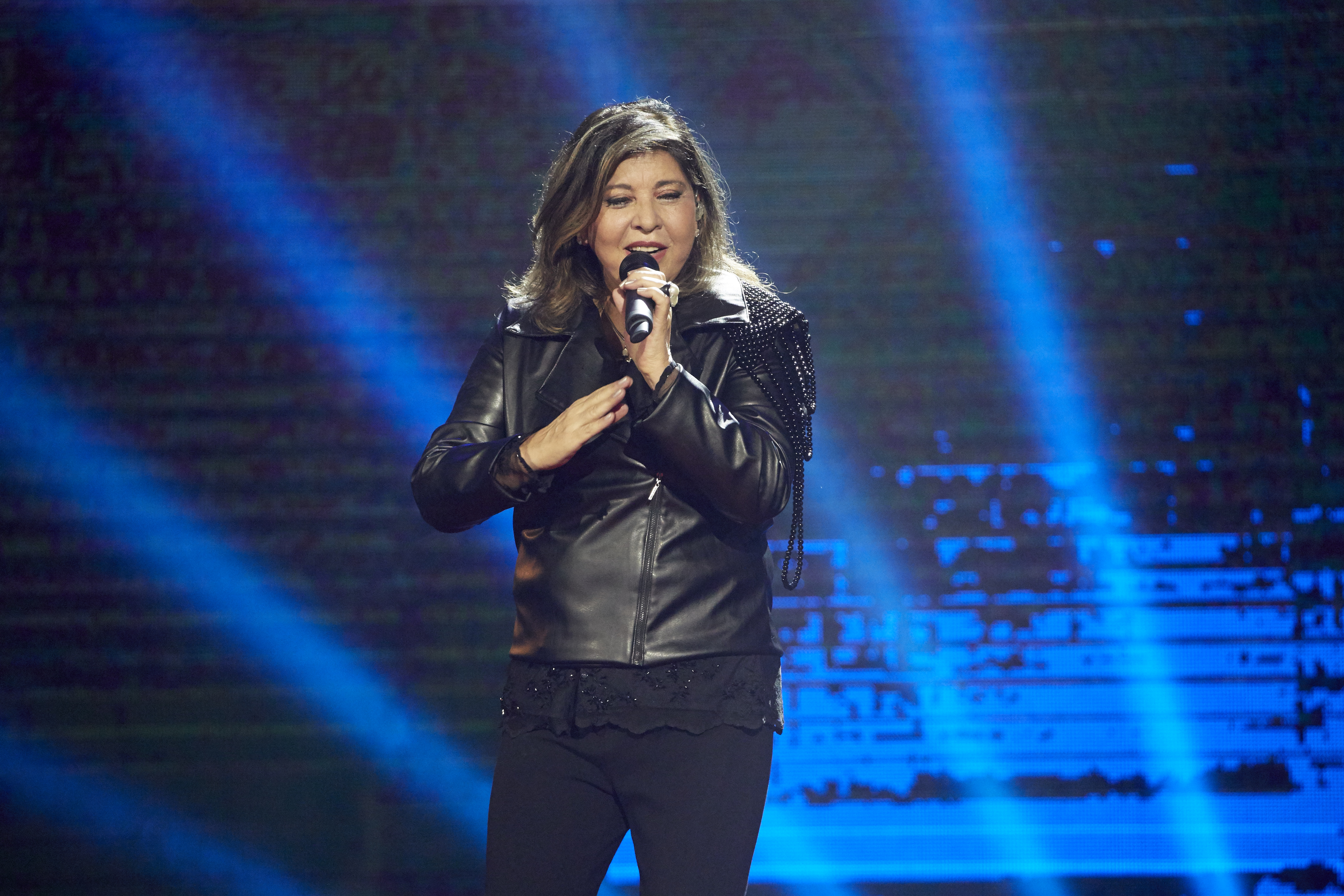

Background information
- Born: Maria Albuquerque Miranda; September 28, 1956 (age 69); João Pessoa, PB, Brazil
- Genres: Sertanejo; Fado
- Occupation: Singer
- Instruments: Vocals, classical guitar
- Years active: 1985–present
- Website: robertamiranda.com.br

Roberta Miranda, artistic name of Maria Albuquerque Miranda, from João Pessoa, Paraíba, Brazil is a Brazilian singer. She is the fourth best-selling female artist in Brazil behind Rita Lee (55 million), Xuxa (33 million) and Maria Bethânia (24.3 million), with 15 million discs sold so far. She got her start in the music industry singing in the clubs of São Paulo, Brazil. Among her greatest successes are A Majestade O Sabiá (The Majesty the Sabiá Bird), Vá Com Deus (Go with God), and Sol da Minha Vida (Sun of My Life) the disc that sold 750,000 copies in the early 1990s.

She has successfully collaborated with other MPB (Musica Popular Brasileira) acts, such as Roberto Carlos, Chitãozinho e Xororó, Fagner, and others. In 2015, she won the 26th Brazilian Music Award in the Best Popular Song Singer category.

== Personal life ==
In an interview with Tatá Werneck in the late-night talk show Lady Night, from 2018, Roberta declared herself as trisexual.

== Discography ==
Title	Details
Roberta Miranda	Released: 1986; Format: LP, CD
Volume 2	Released: 1987; Format: LP, CD
Volume 3	Released: 1989; Format: LP, CD
Volume 4	Released: 1990; Format: LP, CD
Coletâneas	Released: 1990; Format: LP, CD
Sol da Minha Vida	Released: 1992; Format: LP, CD
Volume 6	Released: 1993; Format: CD
Volume 7	Released: 1993; Format: CD
Volume 8	Released: 1995; Format: CD
Volume 9	Released: 1996; Format: CD
Vida	Released: 1997; Format: CD
Paixão	Released: 1998; Format: CD
Caminhos	Released: 1999; Format: CD
A Majestade, O Sabiá Ao Vivo	Released: 2000; Format: CD
Histórias de Amor	Released: 2001; Format: CD
Tudo Isto É Fado	Released: 2001; Format: CD
Pele de Amor	Released: 2002; Format: CD
Alma Sertaneja	Released: 2004; Format: CD
Acústico Ao Vivo	Released: 2005; Format: CD, DVD, digital download
Senhora Raiz	Released: 2008; Format: CD, digital download
Sorrir Faz a Vida Valer	Released: 2010; Format: CD, digital download
Boleros	Released: 2011; Format: CD, digital download
Roberta Miranda: 25 Anos - Ao Vivo em Estúdio	Released: 2013; Format: CD, DVD, digital download
Roberta canta Roberto	Released: 2013; Format: CD, digital download
Os Tempos Mudaram (Ao Vivo)	Released: 2017; Format: CD, DVD, digital download

== See also ==
- List of best-selling Latin music artists
