= Patroas =

Studio album by Marília Mendonça and Maiara & Maraisa
- Released: 4 September 2020
- Recorded: 14 June 2020
- Genre: Sertanejo
- Length: 67:00
- Label: Som Livre
- Producer: Marcinho Hipólito; Junior Campi

Marília Mendonça chronology
Todos os Cantos (2019)	Patroas (2020)	Nosso Amor Envelheceu (2021)

Maiara & Maraisa chronology
Aqui em Casa (2019)	Patroas (2020)	Incomparável (2021)

Patroas, also called Festa das Patroas, is the first collaborative studio album by Marília Mendonça and Maiara & Maraisa released on 4 September 2020 by the record label Som Livre. The album contains many remakes of songs by other artists. The only unreleased track that gained prominence was "Quero Você do Jeito Que Quiser", composed by the three. The project was recorded as a live performance on YouTube on 14 June 2020. Between June and August, the album was released in EPs with 4 songs, the first being released on 10 July 2020. Only on 4 September was the project released as a single album.

The song "Uma Vida A Mais," composed by Marília Mendonça, Maraisa, Juliano Tchula, and Elcio di Carvalho, is a version of the song "Listen to Your Heart" by the Swedish pop-rock duo Roxette.

In 2021, Patroas was nominated for a Latin Grammy Award for Best Sertaneja Music Album.

== Background and recording ==
The partnership between the three artists has occurred previously on several occasions, such as in "Motel", on the album Ao Vivo em Goiânia, by Maiara & Maraisa; "Bebaça", on the album Todos os Cantos, by Marília Mendonça; and in the project Agora É Que São Elas, which was released as an EP in 2016 and 2018, which included the song "A Culpa é Dele", also a collaboration between the artists. The song deals with a woman who is suffering from her boyfriend's infidelity with a friend, which caused the end of the relationship. The betrayal, however, does not interfere in any way with the relationship between the two, who place the blame on the unfaithful boyfriend. "I'm not going to stop being your friend because of some guy / Who doesn't respect a woman ," says the lyrics.

Patroas, which was originally a live stream on YouTube, turned into a record, in which the first EP was released on 10 July 2020 with hits from other artists.

== Release and reception ==
Patroas was released in September 2020 by the Brazilian record label Som Livre.

On 17 June 2022, the album was renamed Festa das Patroas, after the courts prohibited the use of the name "Patroas" because it was too similar to the name of the band "A Patroa". Journalist and critic Mauro Ferreira commented on the case, stating that "records should have their titles protected because, ultimately, they are works of art and need to be preserved as such. And this includes, in addition to the title, the cover. Having to change the cover of a record in reissues, as has happened several times due to legal issues, is to tarnish an essential part of the work."

== Track listing ==
No.	Title	Writer(s)	Length
1.	"Quero Você do Jeito Que Quiser"	Marília Mendonça; Maiara; Maraisa	3:35
2.	"10 de Setembro"	Maraisa; Mendonça; Juliano Tchula; Elcio di Carvalho	3:43
3.	"Uma Vida a Mais (Listen To Your Heart)"	Per Gessle; Mats M.P. Persson; Maraisa; Mendonça; Tchula; di Carvalho	3:50
4.	"Assunto Delicado"	Maraisa; Mendonça; Tchula; di Carvalho	3:39
5.	"Você Nem é Tudo Isso"	Maraisa; Mendonça; Tchula; di Carvalho	3:51
6.	"Coração Bandido"	Rafael Dias; Silas Barcelos	4:07
7.	"A Solidão É Uma Ressaca"	Bruno; Felipe	3:51
8.	"Cheiro de Shampoo"	Cecílio Nena	3:09
9.	"Dez Corações"	Cristian Luz	2:56
10.	"Só Pensando Em Você"	Liah Soares	3:44
11.	"Paixão Goiana"	João da Viola; Romeu Wandscheer	2:30
12.	"No Dia Que Eu Saí de Casa"	Joel Marques	2:58
13.	"Te Quero Pra Mim (It Matters To Me)"	Mark D. Sanders; Ed Hill; Edson Cadorini; Raul; Marquinhos	3:22
14.	"Chora Viola" / "Caminheiro" / "Ladrão de Mulher" / "O Campeão" / "A Vaca Já Foi Pro Brejo"	Tião Carreiro; Lourival dos Santos; Jack; Vieira & Vieirinha; Fátima Leão; Netto; Alexandre Carreiro; Santos; Vicente P. Machado	6:12
15.	"Nuvem de Lágrimas"	Paulo Debétio; Paulinho Rezende	3:20
16.	"Nada Mudou"	Paulino	3:29
17.	"Deixa Eu Te Amar"	Cadorini; Flavinho	3:19
18.	"Não Aprendi a Dizer Adeus"	Marques	2:33
19.	"Cara Ou Coroa (A Cara O Cruz)"	C. Villa De La Torre; A. Monroy Fernandez; Carlos Colla	3:04
Total length:			67:00
