= 2021 Piedade de Caratinga Beechcraft King Air crash =

Plane crash

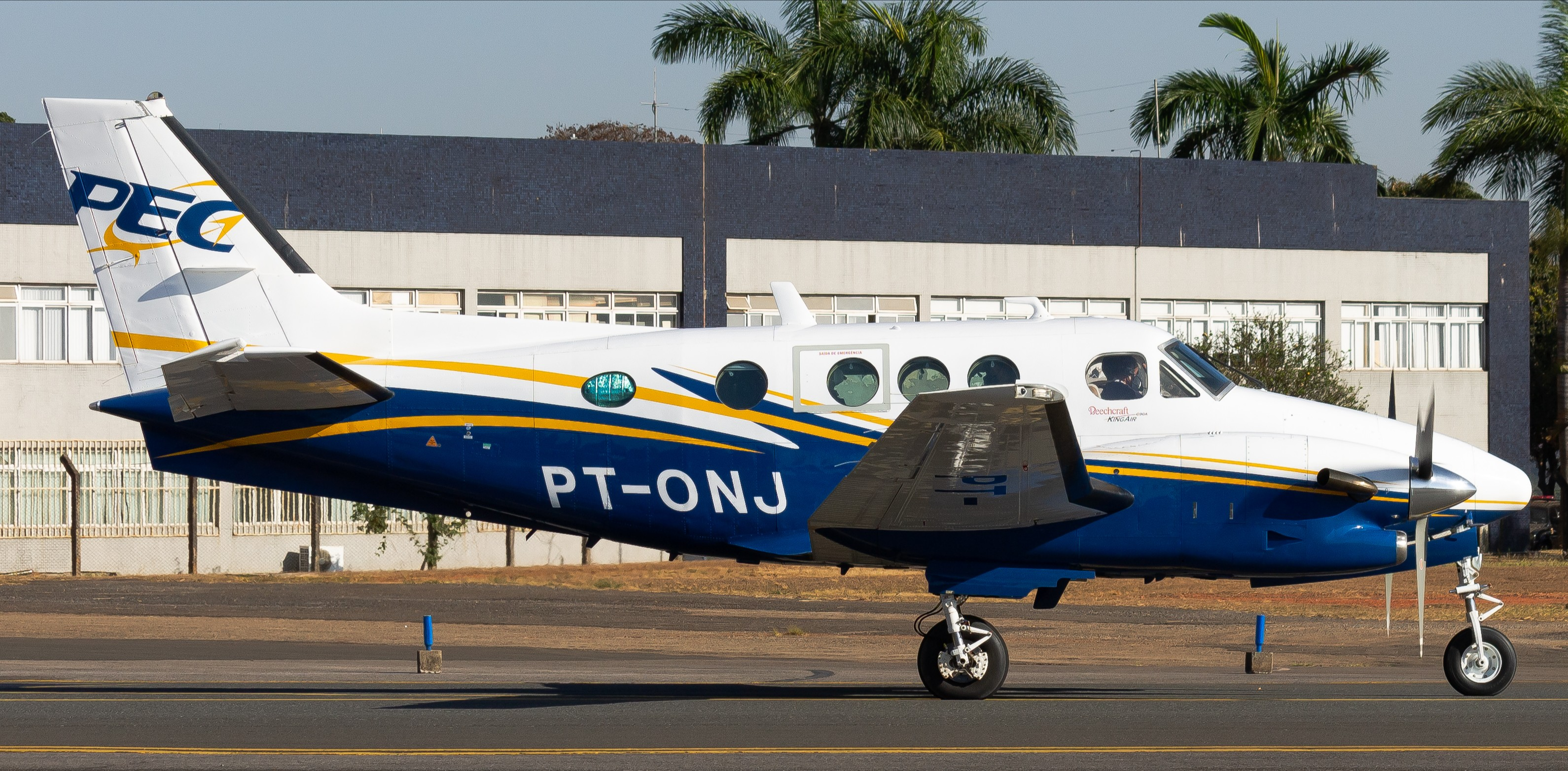
- PT-ONJ, the aircraft involved, photographed in August 2021, less than 3 months before the accident.

Accident
- Date: 5 November 2021
- Summary: Collision with terrain in controlled flight, (Note: According to the National Civil Aviation Agency (ANAC), a Controlled Flight Collision with Terrain (CFIT) is defined as "an aircraft accident that occurs when an aircraft, even with its equipment and systems functioning properly and under the control of a pilot, collides with the ground, water, or an obstacle." In the accident in question, the aircraft, with all its systems functioning, collided with an obstacle and then crashed into the ground.) possible spatial disorientation, failure in flight planning and pilot error.
- Site: Piedade de Caratinga, Minas Gerais, Brazil; 19°46′6″S 42°6′28″W

Aircraft
- Aircraft type: Beechcraft C90A King Air
- Operator: PEC Aviation
- Registration: PT-ONJ
- Flight origin: Goiânia International Airport, Goiânia
- Destination: Caratinga Airport, Ubaporanga, Brazil
- Passengers: 3
- Crew: 2
- Fatalities: 5
- Survivors: 0

On 5 November 2021, a Beechcraft C90A King Air, registered as PT-ONJ and serving as a air taxi, crashed in the Brazilian municipality of Piedade de Caratinga, Minas Gerais state, killing all five occupants, including singer Marília Mendonça. The plane was flying with three passengers and two crew members to neighboring municipality Caratinga, where Mendonça was scheduled to perform.

== Victims ==
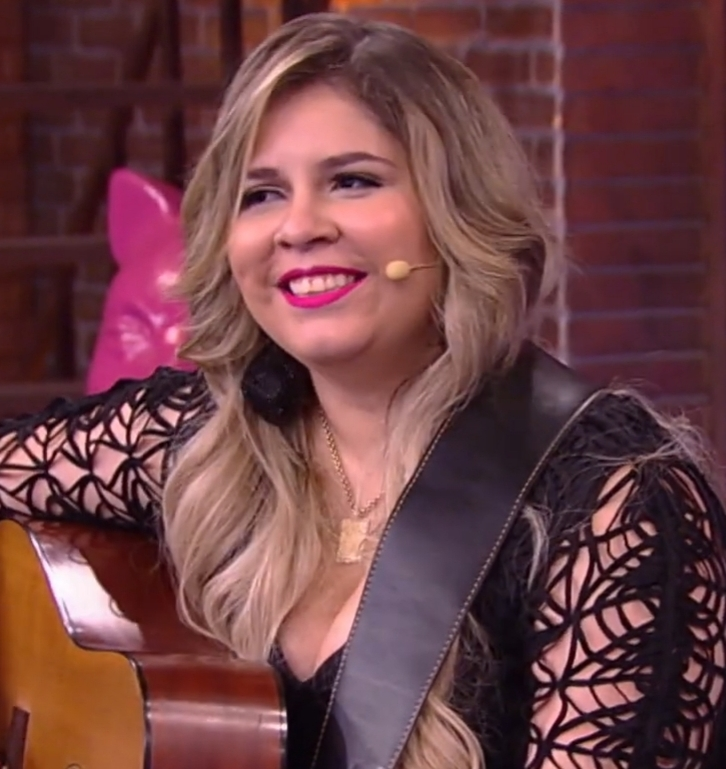
Singer Marília Mendonça, along with 4 other people, were the fatal victims of the crash.

All five occupants on board the aircraft died as a result of the accident. They were:

- Marília Mendonça, singer and songwriter, 26;
- Henrique "Bahia" Ribeiro, Marília's producer, 32;
- Abicieli Silveira Dias Filho, the singer's uncle and publicist, 43;
- Geraldo Martins de Medeiros Júnior, the plane's pilot, 56;
- Tarciso Pessoa Viana, the plane's co-pilot, 37.

== Investigations ==
The investigation was conducted by CENIPA, on preliminary data, the plane with registration number PT-ONJ was up to date and with active registration. The plane and pilot were authorized to perform air taxi service and both pilot and copilot were considered experienced and the flying conditions at the time of the crash were favorable.

At the scene there was a strong smell of fuel but no fire.

On 5 November, the Companhia Energética de Minas Gerais issued a note stating that the aircraft had hit power lines in Caratinga, in the Vale do Rio Doce. Preliminary information from pilots who were flying over the area at the same time of the crash corroborate the statement, having witnessed the moment when the twin-engine turboprop aircraft hit the electric cables.

On 15 May, 2023, Cenipa released the final report regarding the cause of the accident. It found that the pilots had initiated the approach too early and at a significantly greater distance than expected for a Category B aircraft (Note: Category B: 169 km/h (91 kt) or more but less than 224 km/h (121 kt) IAS) and with a very low separation from the ground.

The investigation could not conclusively determine why but four possible contributing factors were identified:

- The pilots inadequately assessed the aircraft's operating parameters since the downwind leg was elongated by a significantly greater distance than that expected for a "Category B" aircraft in landing procedures under VFR.
- It was suspected that during the approach, the flight crew had their attention focused on the runway at the expense of maintaining a proper separation from terrain.
- It was also suspected that the pilot-in-command may have been influenced by his ten-year experience of flying long final approaches, making the actions automated in relation to the profile performed in the accident. (Note: This could've triggered his procedural memory involving cognitive activities and motor skills.)
- And finally, though it couldn't be determined, it is possible that the crew didn't use the available aeronautical charts, which could've further decreased the crew's already low situational awareness regarding the presence of power lines around the airport.

== See also ==
- List of fatalities from aviation accidents
