= Maiara & Maraisa =

Brazilian singing duo

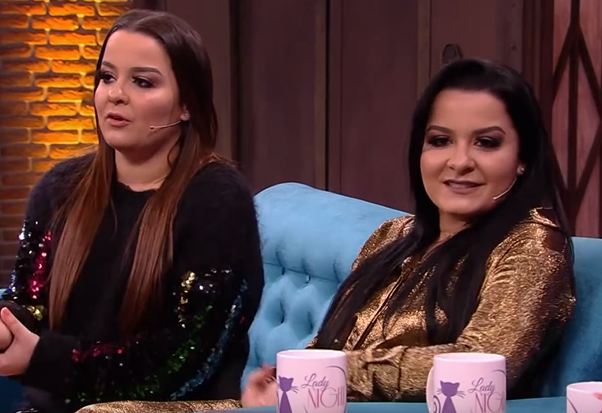

Background information
- Origin: São José dos Quatro Marcos, Mato Grosso, Brazil
- Genres: Sertanejo music
- Years active: 1993 – present
- Label: Som Livre (2016—present)
- Members: Maiara Carla Henrique Pereira; Carla Maraisa Henrique Pereira

Maiara & Maraisa is a sertanejo musical duo consisting of twin sisters Maiara Carla Henrique Pereira and Carla Maraísa Henrique Pereira (born 31 December 1987). Both of them are singers, songwriters, multi-instrumentalists and businesswomen. They rose to prominence with the hits "10%" and "Medo Bobo".

== Biography ==
The daughters of Marco César Rosa Pereira and Almira Henrique, Maiara and Maraisa were born in São José dos Quatro Marcos, Mato Grosso, on 31 December 1987, and spent their childhood and adolescence in several cities across the country. Initially, before fame, they lived in their hometown, and soon after they were born they moved to Juruena. Throughout their childhood and adolescence they also lived in the city of Rondonópolis where their father Marcos César worked as a bank clerk, and in the cities of Araguaína, Montes Claros, Governador Valadares and Belo Horizonte.

Maiara started studying law and music, but only completed music and she stopped studying law in the fifth semester. Maraísa started studying international relations and music, but concluded only the latter, leaving the former in the fifth semester. They began singing at the age of five, and at that time they took the stage for the first time, during the Festival da Canção. In March 2004, they released an album titled Geminis Totalmente Livre.

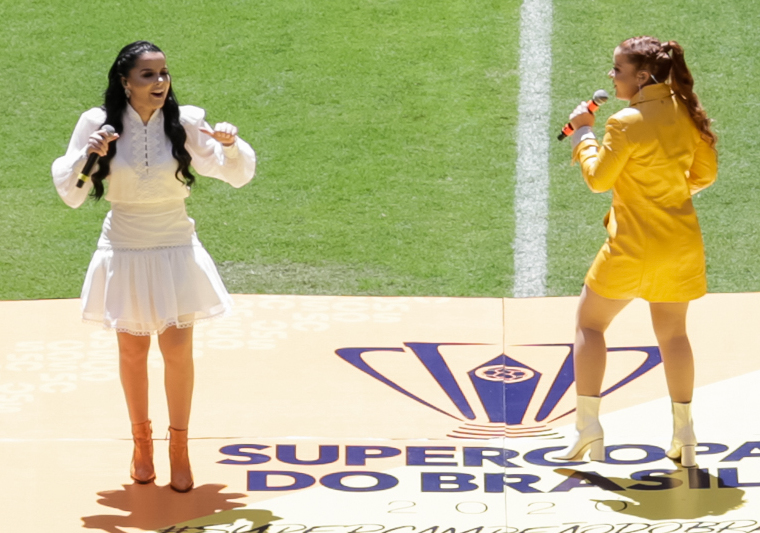
Maiara & Maraisa at the opening show of the 2020 Supercopa do Brasil.

The duo Jorge & Mateus was important for the success of the twins, as they were the ones who always helped them, especially Jorge, called "father" by Maiara and Maraisa.

After the release of No Dia do Seu Casamento, the duo became known as "As Patroas" and also for their songs like "10%", "Se Olha no Espelho", "No Dia do Seu Casamento" and "Medo Bobo", which are present on the album Ao Vivo em Goiânia (2016) and which reached the top of the Brazilian charts. Then they the live album "Ao vivo em Campo Grande" with songs like such as Bengala & Crochê, Sorte Que Cê Beija Bem, Come Que Larga Desse Trem and Combina Demais.

Maiara & Maraisa currently resides in Goiânia. The duo are recognized as icons of the feminejo musical subgenre. The duo participated in a campaign of CAIXA lotteries to promote the drawing of the Mega-Sena on New Year's Eve in 2021. A wise choice, considering that the twins celebrate their birthday on December 31.

== Discography ==
Solo albums

- Totalmente Livre (2004)
- No Dia do Seu Casamento (2014)
- Ao Vivo em Goiânia (2016)
- Ao Vivo em Campo Grande (2017)
- Reflexo (2018)
- Aqui em Casa (2019)
- Incomparável (2021)

Collaboration albums

- Agora É Que São Elas 2 (with Marília Mendonça) (2018)
- Patroas (with Marília Mendonça) (2020)
- Patroas 35% (with Marília Mendonça) (2021)
- Identidade_ (2023)
