= Bruno & Marrone =

Brazilian sertanejo duo

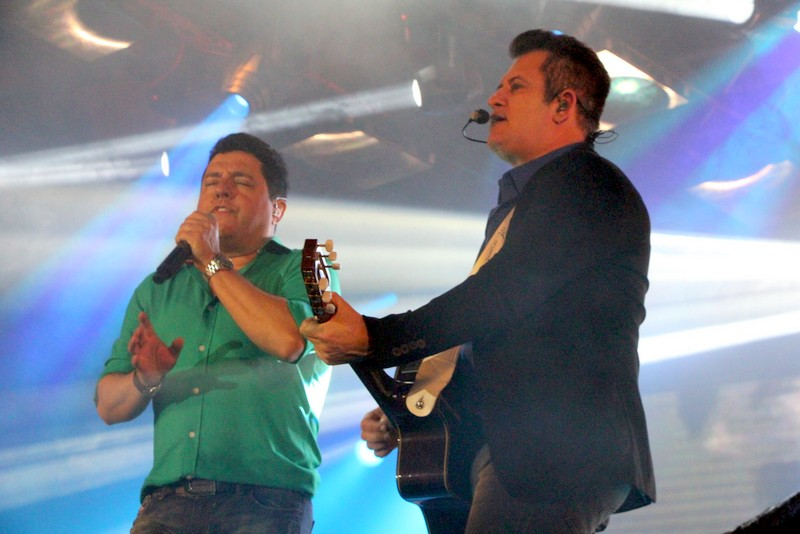

Background information
- Origin: Goiânia, Brazil
- Genres: Sertanejo, pop, country
- Years active: 1986 - present
- Labels: Warner, BMG, Sony BMG, Sony, Universal
- Members: Vinicius Felix de Miranda (Bruno); José Roberto Ferreira (Marrone)
- Website: http://www.brunoemarrone.com.br

Bruno & Marrone are a Brazilian sertanejo/pop/country duo from Goiânia, formed in 1988 by singers Bruno (vocals and guitar) and Marrone (vocals and accordion).

Bruno (b. Vinicius Felix de Miranda, 1969) performed for a decade as a solo musician before approaching Leandro e Leonardo for help finding a partner. They introduced him to Marrone (b. José Roberto Ferreira, 1964), a concertina player. Their debut was released by Warner Records in 1995; they have enjoyed a successful and prolific career since then, releasing more than one album per year. In 2002, they won a Latin Grammy for their DVD release.

== Discography ==
*Also available on DVD

- (1995) Bruno & Marrone
- (1996) Bruno & Marrone - Vol. 2
- (1997) Acorrentado em Você
- (1998) Viagem
- (1999) Cilada de Amor
- (2000) Paixão Demais
- (2000) Acústico
- (2001) Acústico ao Vivo*
- (2002) Minha Vida, Minha Música
- (2002) Sonhos, Planos, Fantasias
- (2003) Inevitável
- (2004) Ao Vivo*
- (2005) Meu Presente é Você
- (2006) Ao Vivo em Goiânia*
- (2007) Acústico II*
- (2009) De Volta aos Bares*
- (2010) Sonhando
- (2011) Juras de Amor
- (2012) Pela Porta da Frente*
- (2014) Agora*
- (2017) Ensaio*
- (2019) Studio Bar*

== See also ==
- List of best-selling Latin music artists
