= Naiara Azevedo =

Brazilian singer-songwriter

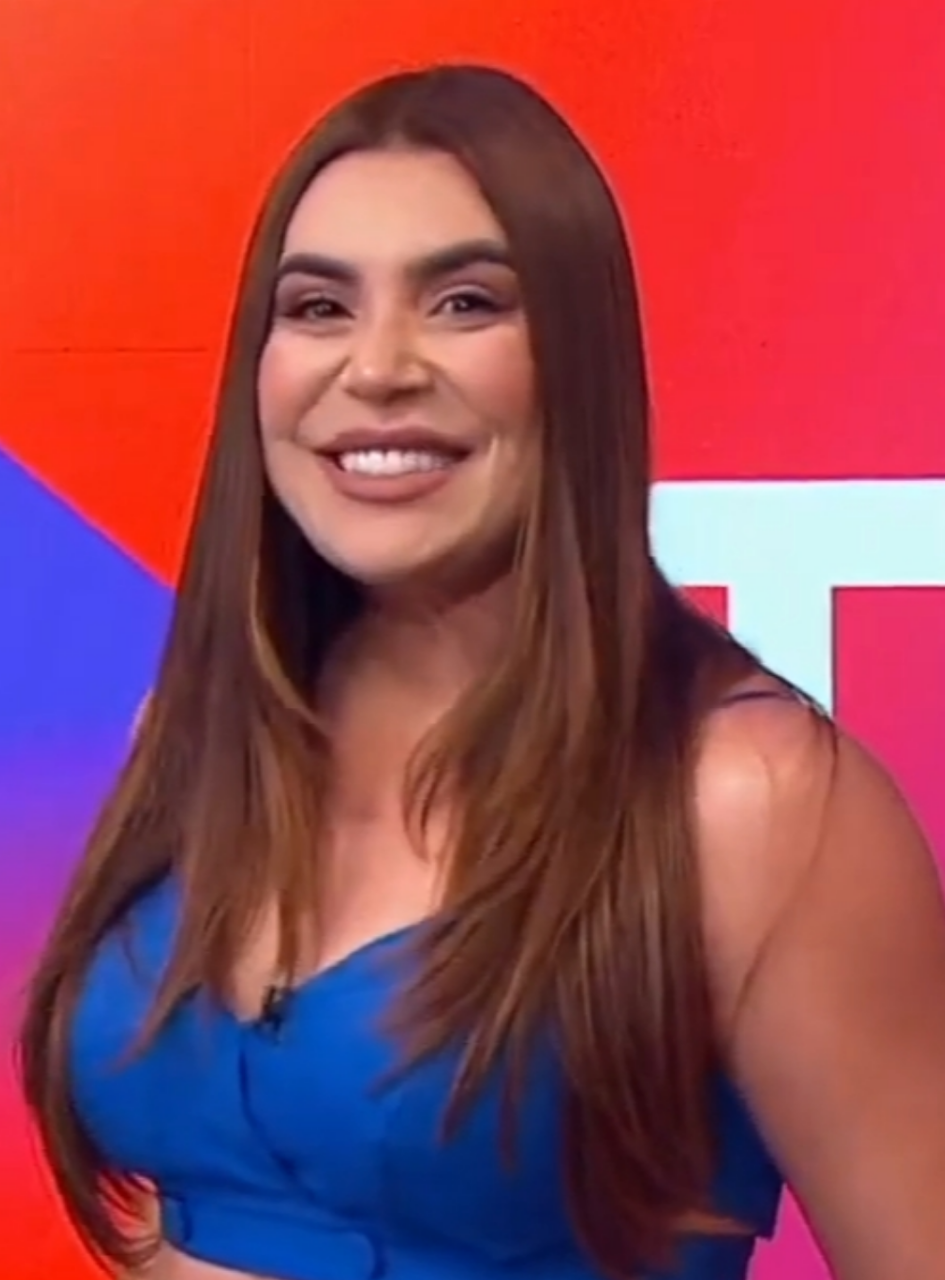
- Azevedo in 2023
- Born: 30 October 1989 (age 36); Campo Mourão (present-day Farol), Paraná, Brazil
- Occupations: Singer; songwriter; instrumentalist
- Spouse: Rafael Cabral (m. 2016; div. 2021)
- Musical career
- Genres: Música sertaneja
- Instruments: Vocals; guitar
- Years active: 2011–present
- Website: http://naiaraazevedo.com/

Naiara de Fátima Azevedo (born 30 October 1989) is a Brazilian singer-songwriter.

== Biography ==
Naiara de Fátima Azevedo was born in the city of Farol, Paraná, Brazil, on October 30, 1989. She is the daughter of Iraci Azevedo and Amarildo Azevedo.

Born in a family of musicians, where her uncles, grandparents, and cousins were musicians, music had a strong influence on her as a child. During her childhood and adolescence she sang in a church choir.

Naiara was raised on her family's farm, where she lived until she was 18. After turning 18 she left home to live alone in the city of Umuarama, where she attended the School of Aesthetics and Cosmetology. During her university studies, she worked during the week as a waitress, and sang in bars on weekends.

In 2012, she moved to Londrina to further her musical career. She made a living singing at birthday parties, weddings, and nightclubs. In 2013, after publishing her work on the internet, she caught the attention of the music industry, and recorded her first DVD. In interviews she said her idols are the duo Chitãozinho & Xororó.

Naiara has performed in every Brazilian state as well as some American states such as Massachusetts, New Jersey, Florida, Georgia, and California.

In January 2022, Naiara joined in Big Brother Brasil 22, as a celebrity. She was the 3rd evicted of the program.

== Personal life ==
Naiara married businessman Rafael Cabral on October 18, 2016. The couple had been dating since 2012.

== Career ==
Naiara's professional career started in 2011, while in Umuarama. After listening to the song "Sou Foda", by the duo Carlos & Jader, which she believed cast a negative view of women, Naiara decided to compose a song in response and post a video of her performance on YouTube. Her song, dubbed "Coitado", which had feminist lyrics, brought Naiara fame.

Naiara typically plays at 20 to 27 shows per month, earning her the slogan which she uses to promote her work: “Naiara Azevedo: defending the ladies”. In 2012, Naiara ended up moving to Londrina, where she recorded her first DVD in 2013. In January 2016, Naiara moved to Goiânia, to record her new album "Totalmente Diferente", which debuted the hit song "50 Reais", which quickly became one of the most played songs on Brazilian radio, in addition to entering the world's top 100 most viewed videos on YouTube.

In April 2017, Naiara announced on social media that she was recording her third DVD and fourth live album, "Constraste". Her debuting performance was held in Rio de Janeiro, on May 9, 2017, featuring special guest appearances from Ivete Sangalo, Gusttavo Lima, Wesley Safadão, and Kevinho. In late 2017, Naiara released a new track entitled "Pegada Que Desograma", quickly reaching the top of the Billboard Hot 100.

In 2018, Naiara released the songs "Buá Buá", composed by Tierry and Matheus Kennedy, and "Chora No Meu Colo".

In February 2019, Naiara recorded the album "Naiara Sunrise", directed by the Goiás music producer Blener Maycom. The album was recorded on the helipad of the Órion Complex, the fourth tallest building in Brazil. In November 2019, Naiara released the single "Manda Audio", with the participation of the pagodeiro Dilsinho. Both were accused of plagiarism for having "stolen" the music of the Brazilian band Di Propposto. Naiara posted a video on her Instagram stating, "The music is not composed by the pagode band. There are other composers. I didn't steal anyone's music. I paid for the song, bought exclusivity, and went to the studio to record the song I received from the composers".
