= Cinema Rio Branco =

Coordinates: 13°01′56″S 39°00′33″W

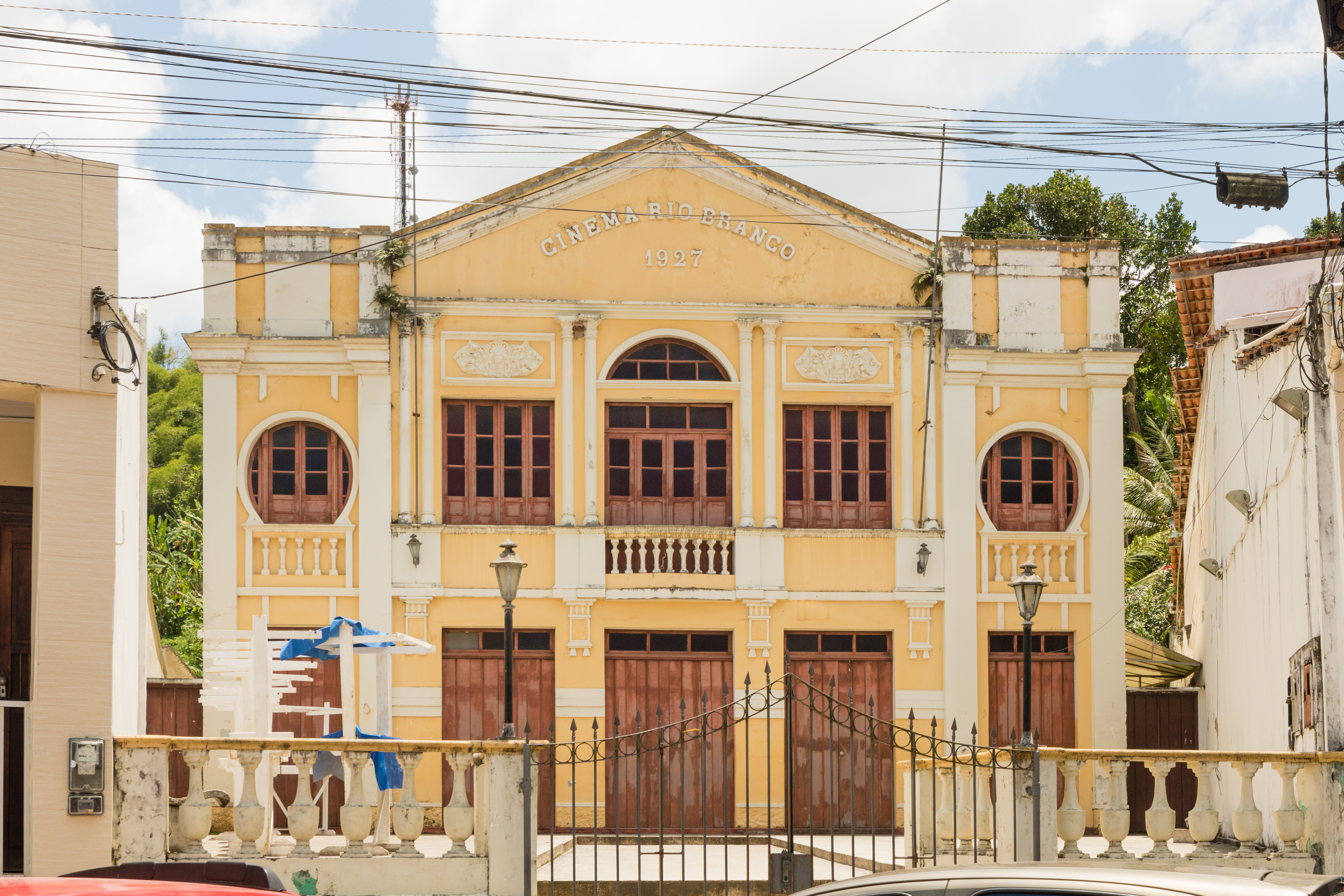
- Interactive map of the Cinema Rio Branco area

General information
- Architectural style: Art Nouveau
- Location: Nazaré, Brazil, Rua Agerson Jorge Sena
- Opened: 1927; 99 years ago
- Owner: Vampeta

Cinema Rio Branco is a cinema founded in 1927 in Nazaré, Bahia, Brazil. Built in an Art Nouveau style, it is one of the oldest still operating cinemas of Brazil.

== History ==
Cinema Rio Branco was founded in 1927, Nazaré, by Felisberto Ribeiro Soares, from the Ribeiro Soares family. The first film to be exhibithed was Uma Noite de Amor. The cinema was also used for shows. Among the artists that have performed in it were Luiz Gonzaga, Waldick Soriano, Raul Seixas and Dalva de Oliveira.

Between the 70s and 90s, the family sold the cinema and its equipment was put out of use for lack of use and structural risks, and it started opening only for public exhibitions.

In 1998, Uriel, one of the restorers, asked soccer player Vampeta to help fix the roof. While talking to Uriel, Vampeta discovered Universal Church of the Kingdom of God wanted to buy the cinema to open a new church, and he decided to help with the restoration efforts to protect the city's heritage.

In 1999, Vampeta posed for G Magazine, the first openly gay magazine of Brazil, for R$ 80 thousand. He used all the money to help with the restoration, and kept donating to the cinema using his own wages. In total, Vampeta estimates he has donated R$100 thousand for the cinema. Uriel and Vampeta's aunties, Beta and Edna, were the ones behind the restoration project.

In 2006, Uriel decided to walk away from the project, and Vampeta bought the cinema to guarantee the restoration would be completed. In 2007 the cinema opened again for students of public schools, but it still lacked sponsors.

== Homages ==
On 8 October 2021, the cinema was honored in the 3ª Mostra Cinemas do Brasil festival.

In 2017, Eudaldo Monção Rocha Júnior together with Memorabilia Filmes and Canal Futura, produced the documentary Cine Rio Branco, about the history of the cinema. The documentary was remade with the name Quando a sala de projeção vira personagem (When the screening room becomes a character) and it was premiered in the cinema on 26 May 2025. It was directed by Eudaldo Monção Rocha Júnior and produced by Memorabilia Filmes.
