= Tchakabum =

Brazilian musical group

- Origin: Rio de Janeiro, Brazil
- Genres: Pagode baiano, Pagode, Axé
- Years active: 1999–2010; 2016–present
- Labels: Universal (1999–2003); Radar (2004–2005)
- Members: Marcelo Menezes; Nem Menezes
- Past members: Gracyanne Barbosa; Elaine Costa; Jaqueline Farias; Mariana Souza

Tchakabum is a Brazilian musical group founded in Rio de Janeiro in 1998, being originally formed with brothers Marcelo and Nem Menezes as vocalists and dancer Gracyanne Barbosa.

== Career ==
In 1999, brothers Marcelo and Nem Menezes, both from Rio de Janeiro, decided to create a musical group that mixed pagode baiano and axé, inspired by the success of groups in these genres from Bahia. They invited dancer Gracyanne Barbosa to be part of the group and named the project Tchakabum. Their success "Tesouro de Pirata" became widely known due to the influence of Kleber Bambam on the first season of Big Brother Brasil in 2002.

In 2005, Marcelo left Tchakabum after various conflicts with his brother and formed a new band, Capitão Pirata. The group continued with just Nem and Barbosa as the dancer, but the group ended up losing their contract with the record label. As a result, they went through a period of financial difficulty.

In 2008, after Capitão Pirata did not bring the success he had hoped to achieve, Marcelo returned to Tchakabum; However, Barbosa would soon after leave the project, due to her dissatisfaction that the group had not released new material in 4 years. She was replaced by Jaqueline Farias and Elaine Costa.

In 2009, Farias left the group and was then replaced by Mariana Souza, who remained until 2010, when she also left the group. The group then disbanded that year.

They officially reunited for Carnaval 2016. That year, they released the hit "Desce Sobe", which reached 500,000 views for their choreography video and 600,000 plays online in the span of a few weeks. In 2019, they released “Passinho do Rá”.

At the beginning of 2022, they released the single "Cavalona", in partnership with the singer Gabily, a song that mixes trap beats with pagode baiano music. In that same year, the hit “Tubarão Te Amo”, by DJ LK, made Tchakabum return to the charts.

== Other appearances ==
On 2 October 2015, Marcelo entered the 5th season of Além do Peso, a reality show on RecordTV, and was one of the finalists for that season.

In April 2019, Marcelo and Costa entered as one of the couples in the 4th season of the reality show Power Couple on RecordTV.

In January 2025, Barbosa entered the 25th season of Big Brother Brasil, initially competing in a duo with her sister Giovanna Jacobina.

== Members ==
=== Vocalists ===
- Marcelo Menezes (1998–2005; 2008–2010; 2016–present)
- Monsueto Menezes (Nem) (1998–2010; 2016–present)

=== Dancers ===
- Gracyanne Barbosa (2000–2008)
- Elaine Costa (2008–2010)
- Jaqueline Farias (2008–2009)
- Mariana Souza (2009–2010)

=== Studio albums ===
| Album | Details |
|---|---|
| Avião | Release: 14 November 1999; Format: CD; Record label: Universal |
| Capitão Tchaka | Release: 28 January 2001; Format: CD; Record label: Universal |
| Explosão | Release: 9 December 2003; Format: CD; Record label: Universal |

=== Live albums ===
| Album | Details |
|---|---|
| Ao Vivo | Release: 16 June 2002; Format: CD; Record label: Universal |
| Ensaio do Tchakabum | Release: 18 August 2003; Format: CD; Record label: Radar |
| Ao Vivo 2 | Release: 7 November 2004; Format: CD; Record label: Radar |

=== Collections ===
| Album | Detail |
|---|---|
| Olha a Onda com Tchakabum | Release: 28 January 2016; Formats: CD, digital download; Record label: Independent |

=== Singles ===
| Title | Year | Album |
|---|---|---|
| "Avião" | 1999 | Avião |
| "Quebra Galho" | 2000 | Avião |
| "Tesouro de Pirata (Onda Onda)" | 2001 | Capitão Tchaka |
| "Aninha na Praia" | 2001 | Capitão Tchaka |
| "Chupeta de Trem" | 2002 | Capitão Tchaka |
| "Dança da Mãozinha" | 2002 | Ao Vivo |
| "Flutua" | 2002 | Ao Vivo |
| "Lá Vai a Bomba" | 2003 | Ensaio do Tchakabum |
| "Explosão" | 2003 | Explosão |
| "Curupaco" | 2004 | Explosão |
| "De Balão" | 2004 | Explosão |
| "Quebra" | 2004 | Ao Vivo 2 |
| "Mão na Cintura" | 2005 | Ao Vivo 2 |
| "Dance Psy" | 2010 | |
| "Não Foge" | 2010 | |
| "Desce Sobe" | 2016 | Olha a Onda com Tchakabum |
| "Tudo Ela Faz de Shortinho" | 2016 | |
| "Ai que Calor" | 2016 | |
| "Lentamente" | 2018 | |
| "Joga Esse Bum" (with Psirico) | 2019 | |
| "Mexe Subindo e Descendo" | 2019 | |
| "Passinho do Rá" (with Dennis DJ) | 2019 | |
