= Lorena Improta =

Brazilian dancer, singer, presenter and businesswoman (born 1993)

Lore Improta
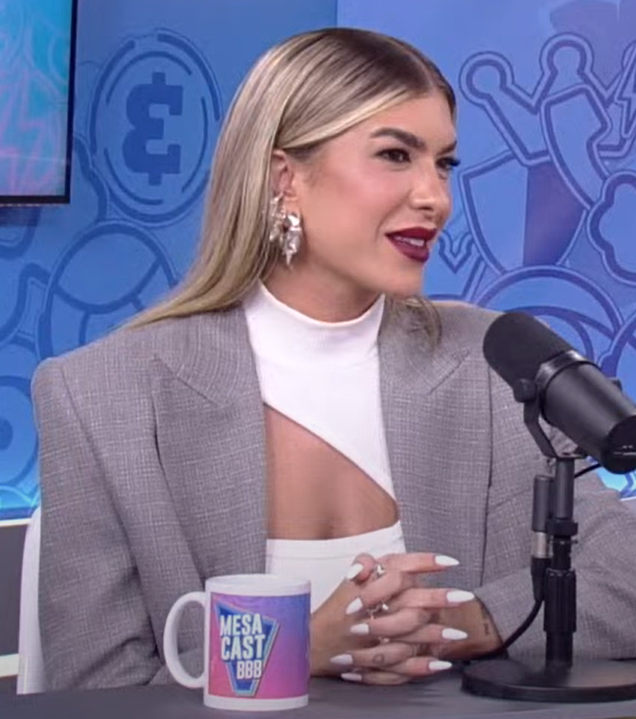
- Improta in 2024
- Born: 1 September 1993 (age 32); Salvador, Bahia, Brazil
- Occupations: Director, writer, journalist
- Years active: Dancer, businesswoman, YouTuber
- Spouse: Leo Santana
- Children: 1

Lorena Improta Nunes Santana, better known as Lore Improta (born 1 September 1993), is a Brazilian dancer, singer, presenter, businesswoman, YouTuber, and advertising professional. She began her artistic career as a child and became known nationally for becoming a dancer on Domingão do Faustão through their competition.

== Career ==
Improta was born on 1 September 1993 in Salvador, and in her youth was enrolled by her mother in ballet classes, but was quickly transferred to karate classes. She practiced the martial art for 10 years and became a two-time champion in the state of Bahia. She began her artistic career at 9 years old, dancing with Bloco Algodão Doce, a children's project by Carla Perez, which she was a part of for 6 years. At 13, she took part in a group that teaches dance at gyms in her city.

At 18, she participated in an exchange program for a year in Canada, where she danced jazz and hip hop. On returning to Brazil, she graduated with a degree in publicity and advertising and helped to establish the group FitDance, of which she was their choreographer until 2016.

In 2015, she was signed up by her mother and a fan of hers in a contest for the program Domingão do Faustão which sought to hire a new dancer for their dance troupe. She competed for the spot along with 12,000 dance professionals, and after various steps disputed live on the program, she won the contest. Improta remained with the show for two years until she announced her departure to dedicate herself to caring for her sick mother and to plan for a new professional phase.

In 2017, she began her own dance project, Show da Lore, where she presents choreographies of popular songs in Brazil in tours around the country. Noting the large number of kids in the audience of her shows, she decided to launch a kid's version of the special, titled O Fantástico Mundo da Lore, the following year. The project also launched its own YouTube channel and original music.

In 2018, she made her debut at the Rio Carnaval, marching with the samba school Unidos do Viradouro, which was elected champion of the Grupo de Acesso. Later on, she was announced as the new presenter for the channel GNT. Her program, Me Deixa Dançar, made its debut in March 2019. Alongside this, Improta recorded weekly videos for her YouTube, teaching the dances presented on her reality show.

In 2020, she returned to Unidos do Viradouro as the muse of the school, which was then the champion of the Grupo Especial.

== Personal life ==
Improta began dating singer Leo Santana in February 2017. In July of that year, they announced their engagement; In December, however, their relationship ended. From that point, they had an on and off relationship, breaking up for the fourth time in 2019. In June 2020, they began to date again, and married on 20 February 2021 in a civil ceremony. They had a private ceremony due to the COVID-19 pandemic, with only their parents and their siblings present. In March 2021, they announced that Lore was pregnant.

After their marriage, they adopted each other's last names.

Their daughter, Liz, was born on 26 September of that year. In September 2022, she showed the public that she got a tattoo done in tribute to her daughter.

== Filmography ==
=== Television ===
Year	Title	Role
2013	O Canto da Sereia	Support cast
2015–2017	Domingão do Faustão	Dancer
2019	Me Deixa Dançar	Presenter/choreographer
2019	São João da Thay	Reporter
2019	Dança dos Famosos	Technical juror

=== Internet ===
Year	Title	Role	Notes
2011–presente	Canal Lore Improta	Herself	
2018–presente	O Fantástico Mundo da Lore	Herself	On channel made for kids
2019	Me Deixa Dançar - A Coreografia	Presenter/choreographer	On GNT's YouTube channels
2019	SóTocaTop	Top Presenter	
2020	BBBXP	Guest	
2020	Festival de Verão Salvador	Presenter	

Year	Song	Artist
2017	"Sonhei Que Tava Me Casando"	Wesley Safadão
2018	"Só Vou Apostando"	Harmonia do Samba (feat. Xand Avião)
2020	"Ela Não Quer Guerra Com Ninguém"	Parangolé

== Songs ==
Year	Song	Video clip	Choreography video
2018	"Aula de Dancinha"	check	check
2018	"Movimenta o Corpo"	check	✗
2018	"E Aí, Galeroca"	check	check
2019	"Festa no Parquinho"	check	check
2019	"Aula de Dancinha (Remix)"	✗	✗
2019	"Forrozinho Bom"	check	check
2019	"Remelexo"	check	check
2019	"Passa Passa"	check	check
2020	"Pipoca"	check	check
2020	"Remelexo (Brega Funk)"	check	check

== Specials ==
Year	Title
2017–present	Show da Lore
2018–present	O Fantástico Mundo da Lore

== Products ==
Lojinha da Lore: Improta has a virual store with children's products, where she sells notebooks, pencil cases, backpacks, shirts, and accessories of her brand.

Aloha Shoes by Lore Improta: She released a collection of sandals in partnership with the Bahian brand Aloha Shoes.

#CarnaLore: Bikini collection created and sold in partnership with Naked Swimwear.

== Awards ==
Year	Organization	Category	Result
2022	Prêmio iBest Award	Bahian Influencer	Top 3
