= Dinei (footballer, born 1983) =

Brazilian footballer

Personal information
- Full name: Telmário de Araújo Sacramento
- Date of birth: November 11, 1983 (age 42)
- Place of birth: São Domingos, Brazil
- Height: 1.86 m (6 ft 1 in)
- Position: Striker

Team information
- Current team: Vitória

Youth career
- 2001–2002: Bragantino

Senior career*
Years	Team	Apps	(Gls)
2003–2011	Atlético Paranaense	22	(5)
2004	→ Ferroviária (loan)		
2006	→ Noroeste (loan)		
2007	→ Guaratinguetá-SP (loan)		
2008	→ Vitória (loan)	14	(8)
2008–2009	→ Celta de Vigo (loan)	37	(11)
2009–2010	→ Tenerife (loan)	23	(0)
2010–2011	→ Palmeiras (loan)	34	(3)
2012–2014	Vitória	130	(44)
2015–2016	Kashima Antlers	13	(2)
2016–2017	Shonan Bellmare	49	(16)
2018	Ventforet Kofu	12	(1)
2018	Matsumoto Yamaga	4	(1)
2020	Água Santa	8	(0)
2020–2021	Jacuipense	23	(7)
2021–2025	Vitória	11	(2)
- * Club domestic league appearances and goals

Telmário de Araújo Sacramento, known by his nickname Dinei (born November 11, 1983 in São Domingos, Bahia), is a Brazilian former football striker.

== Career statistics ==
As of match played 22 September 2022.

Appearances and goals by club, season and competition
Club	Season	League			State League		Cup		League Cup		Continental		Other		Total	
Club	Season	Division	Apps	Goals	Apps	Goals	Apps	Goals	Apps	Goals	Apps	Goals	Apps	Goals	Apps	Goals
Vitória (loan)	2008	Série A	14	8	—		—		—		—		—		14	8
Celta Vigo (loan)	2008–09	Segunda División	37	10	—		3	2	—		—		—		40	13
Tenerife (loan)	2009–10	La Liga	23	0	—		2	0	—		—		—		25	0
Palmeiras (loan)	2010	Série A	10	2	—		—		—		3	0	—		13	2
Palmeiras (loan)	2011	Série A	13	0	7	1	0	0	—		1	0	—		21	1
Palmeiras (loan)	Total		23	2	7	1	0	0	—		4	0	—		34	3
Vitória	2012	Série B	12	2	14	3	5	0	—		—		—		31	5
Vitória	2013	Série A	35	16	10	7	3	2	—		2	0	2	0	52	25
Vitória	2014	Série A	31	9	8	3	2	0	—		2	0	4	2	47	14
Vitória	Total		78	27	32	13	10	2	—		4	0	6	2	130	44
Kashima Antlers	2015	J1 League	4	1	—		0	0	0	0	0	0	—		4	1
Kashima Antlers	2016	J1 League	6	1	—		—		3	0	—		—		9	1
Kashima Antlers	Total		10	2	—		0	0	3	0	0	0	—		13	2
Shonan Bellmare	2016	J1 League	16	3	—		2	2	—		—		—		18	5
Shonan Bellmare	2017	J2 League	33	12	—		0	0	—		—		—		33	12
Shonan Bellmare	Total		49	15	—		2	2	—		—		—		64	19
Ventforet Kofu	2018	J2 League	12	1	—		0	0	0	0	—		—		12	1
Matsumoto Yamaga	2018	J2 League	4	1	—		—		—		—		—		4	1
Água Santa	2020	Paulista	—		8	0	—		—		—		—		8	0
Jacuipense	2020	Série C	14	4	—		—		—		—		—		14	4
Jacuipense	2021	Série C	1	0	8	3	—		—		—		—		9	3
Jacuipense	Total		15	4	8	3	—		—		—		—		23	7
Vitória	2021	Série B	13	2	—		1	0	—		—		—		14	2
Vitória	2022	Série C	13	0	3	0	2	0	—		—		0	0	18	0
Vitória	Total		26	2	3	0	3	0	—		—		0	0	32	2
Career total			291	72	58	17	20	6	3	0	8	0	6	2	386	97
