= Sua Música =

Brazilian free music streaming service

- Founded: 2011
- Headquarters: São Paulo, São Paulo, Brazil
- Country of origin: Brazil
- Owners: Roni Bin, Rodrigo Amar, Alan Trope
- Founder: Éder Rocha Bezerra
- Services: Music streaming
- Website: suamusica.com.br
- Registration: Optional

Sua Música (lit. 'Your Music') is a Brazilian free music streaming service founded in 2011 by Eder Rocha Bezerra, in the city of João Pessoa, Paraíba. It is entirely aimed at artists and audiences from the Northeast Region of Brazil, with a predominance of musical genres such as forró, tecnobrega, swingueira, among others. Sua Música is available on Android and iOS. It receives 1 million unique hits per day and is one of the 60 most downloaded apps in Brazil.

== History ==
Sua Música was founded in João Pessoa, Paraíba, by Eder Rocha Bezerra in 2011, initially as a blog. Its content was provided by previously unknown artists. Without any investment, Bezerra, a native of Paraíba, coordinated the website from his home, with the help of two friends. Initially, it was just a hobby, but in a short time it managed to gather 80 thousand unique users in one day. Over time, Sua Música expanded its business and opened offices in São Paulo, Rio de Janeiro, Recife and Fortaleza.

In 2013, the site was acquired by three investors Roni Bin, Rodrigo Amar and Alan Trope.

On December 20, 2023, Sua Música CEO Roni Maltz Bin announced the expansion of the platform and the creation of Sua Música Digital, a business unit derived from the Sua Música streaming.

On July 17, 2024, Warner Music Group acquired a minority stake in Sua Música, with the three partners — Roni Bin, Rodrigo Amar and Alan Trope — remaining as controlling shareholders. The partnership aims to expand Brazilian regional music globally. Roni Bin announced plans to open new music production studios in Brazil and Latin America.
