= Lucas Oliveira (singer) =

Brazilian singer and songwriter

Lukinhas ba
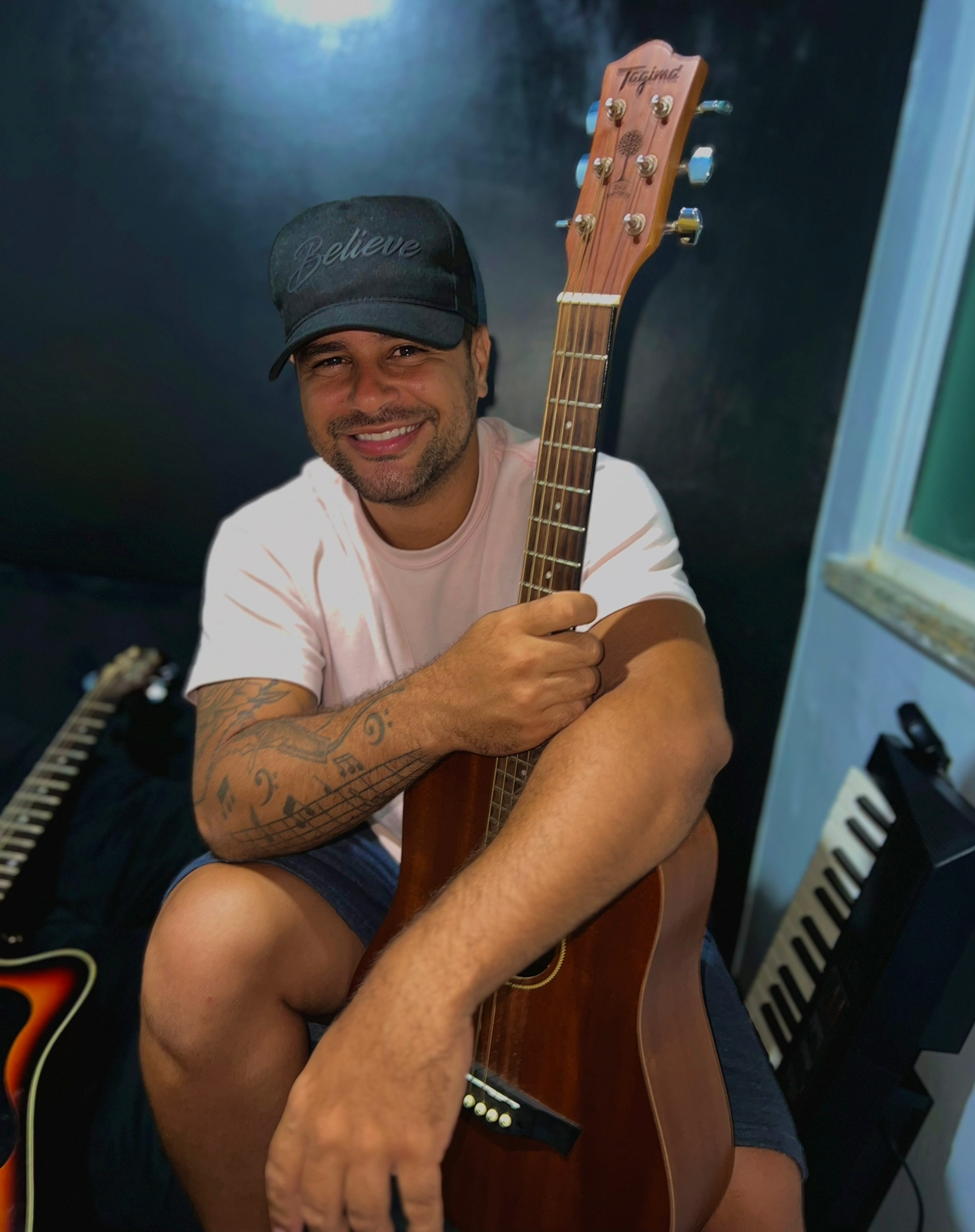
- Born: Lucas Oliveira Borges; April 13, 1990 (age 35); Salvador, Brazil

Lucas Oliveira Borges (born April 13, 1990), better known as Lukinhas ba, is a Brazilian singer and songwriter. He became known after participating in the Axé Music movement along with great artists such as Ivete Sangalo.

== Personal life ==
Lucas was born in Salvador, Bahia region. He started in music in 2012, when he was still 12 years old, at that time he was already singing and scribbling lyrics in his notebook, his mother is called Noemia and his father is Ivanildo.

== Career ==
At age 5, he was already involved with music, always taking part in musicals and plays at school. At the age of 12, he began to follow the path in music by participating in the Axé Music movement with Ivete Sangalo, Saulo Fernandes, Banda Eva, Chiclete com Banana among other big names.

His first show was at an owner-only restaurant, where his first fare was half a pizza and a coke. Years later, the singer began to do shows in bars and picnic areas in Salvador and soon in neighboring cities. With the passing of the years, he began to become known in his region, expanding his shows throughout the interior of Bahia in concert halls and discos and shortly after, breaking the state barrier towards Ceará, Pernambuco, Paraíba, singing his own songs and those of its leading artists such as: Ivete Sangalo, Banda Eva, Chiclete com Banana, among others.

In 2019 he signed a contract with JujubaMusic/SomLivre in which he is currently a part. From there, he recorded signature songs with Léo Santana, Claudia Leitte, Harmonia do Samba, Tarcísio do Acordeon among other names on the national scene that are already scheduled for releases for compositions by Lukinhas ba.

At the beginning of 2020, he released his first single on digital platforms, the song "CÓPIA REDUZIDA".
