= Heltton Matheus =

Brazilian footballer

Personal information
- Full name: Heltton Matheus Cardoso Rodrigues
- Date of birth: 24 March 1994 (age 32)
- Place of birth: Rio de Janeiro, Brazil
- Height: 1.90 m (6 ft 3 in)
- Position: Centre-back

Team information
- Current team: Maricá

Youth career
- 2014–2016: São Gonçalo FC
- 2017: Paulista

Senior career*
| Years | Team | Apps | (Gls) |
| 2017–2020 | Audax-SP | | |
| 2017 | → Vai-Vai (loan) | | |
| 2019 | → Audax-RJ (loan) | | |
| 2021 | Friburguense | | |
| 2021 | Macaé | | |
| 2021 | Maricá | | |
| 2022 | União Frederiquense | | |
| 2022 | Sampaio Corrêa-RJ | | |
| 2022 | 7 de Abril | | |
| 2023 | Pacajus | | |
| 2023 | Maricá | | |
| 2023–2024 | Naft Al-Basra | | |
| 2024– | Maricá | | |
- * Club domestic league appearances and goals as of 22 January 2024

Heltton Matheus Cardoso Rodrigues (born 24 March 1994), better known as Heltton Matheus, is a Brazilian professional footballer who plays as a centre-back for Maricá.

== Career ==
Born in Rio de Janeiro, Heltton began his career in the youth teams São Gonçalo FC

In 2017, he gained national attention when he falsified his identity to play in the Copa São Paulo de Futebol Jr. for Paulista de Jundiaí. Under the name "Brendon", the athlete, who at the time was already 22 years old, competed in the competition claiming to be 19 years old. As Paulista had a great campaign in the competition and ended up qualifying for the final, Heltton was identified by other players who have played with him at São Gonçalo FC, and reported. Paulista was eliminated from the competition and Heltton was severely attacked by the media.

Sports commentator and football director at Grêmio Osasco Audax, former athlete Vampeta committed to giving the player a contract at the club, claiming that even with the mistake made, Heltton was not a criminal. Subsequently, Heltton received the punishment of 1 year away from professional football.

Returning to football in 2019, he was part of the champion squad of the Campeonato Paulista Série A3 with Audax. Afterwards, he played for some clubs in Rio de Janeiro, União Frederiquense-RS and Pacajus. He currently defends Naft Al-Basra SC in Iraq. For the 2024 season, he returned to Maricá FC, where he was part of the squad that won the state A2 and the Copa Rio, remaining for 2025.

== Honours ==
Audax

- Campeonato Paulista Série A3: 2019

Maricá

- Copa Rio: 2024
- Campeonato Carioca Série A2: 2024
