= G Magazine =

Brazilian gay men's magazine

- Cover of the April 2006 issue, featuring Ricardo Villani
- Editor-in-chief: Marcos Brandão
- Categories: Men's
- Frequency: Monthly
- Circulation: 180,000
- Publisher: Editora Fractal
- First issue: October 1997
- Final issue: June 2013
- Country: Brazil
- Language: Portuguese

G Magazine was a Brazilian gay men's magazine from 1997 until 2013 that featured frontal nudity (including erections) and articles for the gay community, created by Ana Fadigas. It was a monthly publication that sold approximately 180,000 issues every month, about half of Playboy. Its online version was G Online.

The magazine featured nude photographs of dozens of Brazilian celebrities as well as foreign celebrities, such as Warren Cuccurullo, guitarist for Duran Duran. Among these Brazilian celebrities are actors Alexandre Frota, Matheus Carrieri and Victor Wagner, model Klaus Hee, DJs, singers Rodrigo Phavanello, Márcio Aguiar and David Cardoso Junior as well as footballers of the national team and other professional teams and contestants of the Brazilian version of Big Brother and other reality shows.

== List of cover models ==
The following is a list of magazine cover models:

=== 1997 ===
Issue	Cover	Month	Note
As Bananaloca Magazine
001	Anderson "Dânder" Di Rizzi	May	Actor
002	Mauro Borges	June	DJ
003	Mauricio Gimenes	July	Model
004	Leandro Seguro	August	Model
005	Régis Molina	September	Model
As G Magazine
001	Vitor Xavier	October	Model
002	Alex Rivera	November	Go-go dancer
003	Marcelo Santos	December	Go-go dancer

=== 1998 ===
Issue	Cover	Month	Note
004	Bismark Corrêa	January	Model
005	Marcos Oliver	February	Pornographic actor
006	Hudson and Hira	March	Dancers for Carrapicho
007	Lucas Palhares	April	Go-go dancer
008	Mauro Borges	May	DJ
009	Tom	June	Dancer for Companhia do Pagode
010	Sandro Zanata	July	Model
011	Mateus Carrieri	August	Mainstream/pornographic actor
012	Gilson Machado	September	Actor on A Praça é Nossa
013	David Cardoso Jr.	October	Actor
014	Alex Sanches	November	Dancer for Gera Samba
015	Sexy Power Man	December	Go-go dancers group

=== 1999 ===
Issue	Cover	Month	Note
016	Vampeta	January	Footballer. The images are widely used by Brazilians for trolling and cancelling, a practice known as vampetaço.
017	Dinei	February	Footballer
018	Victor Wagner	March	Actor
019	David Cardoso	April	Actor
020	You Can Dance	May	Dancers for Planeta Xuxa
021	Rodrigo Pavanello	June	Singer/actor
022	Márcio Duarte	July	Singer
023	Nico Puig	August	Actor
024	Roger Moreira	September	Lead singer of Ultraje a Rigor
025	Roger	October	Goalkeeper
026	Oswaldo Lot (Tiozinho)	November	Model/actor
027	Beto Vasconcelos	December	Model

=== 2000 ===
Issue	Cover	Month	Note
028	Robson Caetano	January	Sprinter
029	Alessander Lenzi	February	Jet ski pilot
030	Rubens Caribé	March	Actor
031	Flávio Maciel	April	Stage assistant on the TV show O+
032	Créo Kellab	May	Actor
033	Marcelo Picchi	June	Actor
034	Latino	July	Singer
035	Esnar Ribeiro	August	Cowboy
036	Mateus Carrieri	September	Mainstream/pornographic actor
037	Márcio Aguiar	October	Dancer
038	Ricardo Feitoza	November	Model
039	Warren Cuccurullo	December	Guitarist for Duran Duran

=== 2001 ===
Issue	Cover	Month	Note
040	Thiago Toqueton	January	No Limite 1 contestant
041	Wander Rodrigues	February	Photographer
042	Rodrigo Pavanello	March	Singer/actor
043	Fábio Borges Mello	April	Singer of Os Travessos
044	Reinaldo	May	Singer of Terra Samba
045	Henrique Alba	June	Model/swimmer
046	Luís Barra	July	Athlete
047	Rafael Vannucci	August	Singer
048	Felipe and Fernando	September	Models
049	Alexandre Frota	October	Mainstream/pornographic actor
050	Théo Becker	November	Actor
051	Wilson Ribeiro	December	Model

=== 2002 ===
Issue	Cover	Month	Note
052	Tadeu Fracari	January	Model
053	Marcelo de Paula	February	Model
054	Conraddo	March	Singer/actor
055	Renato Vianna	April	Model
056	Enrico	May	Singer
057	Marcus Deminco	June	Model
058	Bruno Carvalho	July	Footballer
059	Miguel Kelner	August	Model/actor
060	Rogério Rolim	September	Model
061	Júlio Escaleira	October	Model
062	Cláudio Farias	November	Hairdresser
063	Thales Fracari	December	Model

=== 2003 ===
Issue	Cover	Month	Note
064	Alexandre Frota	January	Mainstream/pornographic actor
065	Márcio Aguiar	February	Dancer
066	Caio Cortez	March	Model
067	Marco Mastronelli	April	Actor
068	Caetano Zonaro	May	Big Brother Brasil 1 contestant
069	Rafael González	June	Acorrentados contestant
070	Julian Righetto	July	O Conquistador do Fim do Mundo contestant
071	Willians	August	Actor
072	Rafael Alencar	September	Gay pornographic actor
073	Marcelo Mathias	October	Casa dos Artistas 3 contestant
074	Aldo Freitas	November	Model
075	Túlio Maravilha	December	Footballer

=== 2004 ===
Issue	Cover	Month	Note
076	Klaus Hee	January	Singer/model
077	Fábio Meirelles	February	No Limite 3 contestant
078	Marcelo Jakybales	March	Model
079	Robinson Rodrigues	April	Baseball player
080	Rogério Dragone	May	Big Brother Brasil 4 contestant
081	Alan Cavalcante	June	Big Brother Brasil 3 contestant
082	Leandro Marinho	July	Model
083	Dimas Caetano	August	Model
084	Alexandre Frota	September	Mainstream/pornographic actor
085	Mateus Carrieri and Kaíke Carrieri	October	Mainstream/pornographic actor and his son
086	Evandro Silveira	November	Former police officer
087	Marcos Baby	December	DJ

=== 2005 ===
Issue	Cover	Month	Note
088	Thiago Lira	January	Big Brother Brasil 4 contestant
089	Alexandre Gaúcho	February	Footballer
090	Walther Verve	March	Actor
091	Júlio Capeletti	April	Model
092	Alê Mañas	May	Casa dos Artistas 4 contestant
093	Alecsandro Massafera	June	Grazi Massafera's brother
094	Daniboy	July	Singer
095	Fabiano Borges	August	Goalkeeper
096	Victor Wagner	September	Actor
097	Bruno Corner	October	Model
098	André Rocha	November	Model
099	Edílson Buba	December	Big Brother Brasil 4 contestant

=== 2006 ===
Issue	Cover	Month	Note
100	Alexandre Frota and Matheus Carrieri	January	Mainstream/pornographic actors
101	Leandro Becker	February	DJ
102	Diogo Paris	March	Scheila Carvalho's nephew
103	Ricardo Villani	April	Model
104	Gustavo Russi	May	Dancer for Tchakabum
105	Carlos Issa	June	Big Brother Brasil 6 contestant
106	Rogério Miranda	July	Model
107	Gustavo Moraes	August	Dancer
108	Daniel "Dan Dan" Costa	September	Big Brother Brasil 6 contestant
109	Bruno Canaan	October	Jogo da Sedução contestant
110	Eric Lobão	November	Former Varig purser
111	Klaus Hee	December	Singer/model

=== 2007 ===
Issue	Cover	Month	Note
112	Kléber Bambam	January	Big Brother Brasil 1 winner
113	Iran Gomes	February	Big Brother Brasil 6 contestant
114	Bira and Caio	March	Models
115	David Cardoso Jr.	April	Actor
116	Rodrigo Carvalho	May	Model
117	Emílio, Ricardo and Leandro Spezze	June	Models
118	Matheus Ohana	July	Paparazzo
119	Coy Cosendey	August	Stunt double
120	Rafael Córdova	September	Goalkeeper
121	Filipe Iecker	October	Model
122	Alexandre Albertoni	November	Singer/model
123	Wagner Limeira	December	Footballer

=== 2008 ===
Issue	Cover	Month	Note
124	Lucas Pugliessa	January	Model/footballer
125	Cláudio Andrade	February	Actor
126	Daniel Coelho	March	Model
127	André Morais	April	Pornographic actor
128	Donato Spigariol	May	Go-go dancer
129	Dan Smith	June	Model
130	Raphael Silva	July	Model
131	Gustavo Moretto	August	Model
132	Ismael Furtado and Rodrigo Carvalho	September	Models
133	Maicon Araújo	October	2008 Mister Gay Florianópolis
134	Richardson Ferreira	November	Actor on Zorra Total
135	Márcio Blade, Kayo Felipe, Ricardo Studenroth and Vinícius de Oliveira	December	Go-go dancers

=== 2009 ===
Issue	Cover	Month	Note
136	Felipe Sacilotti	January	Model
137	Raga Junior	February	Model
138	Samuel Finkler	March	Model
139	Ricardo Villani	April	Model
140	Toni Sales	May	Singer
141	Bruno Canaan	June	Model
142	Rafael Caumo	July	Model
143	Dorian, Reginaldo and Dennis	August	Dancers for Calcinha Preta
144	Fernando Balcevicz	September	Model
145	Anderson Soares	October	2009 Mister Gay Rio de Janeiro
146	Marcos Seya	November	Go-go dancer/model
147	Adriano Morais	December	Go-go dancer/model

=== 2010 ===
Issue	Cover	Month	Note
148	Kayo Felipe	January	Go-go dancer/model (Special: Twilight/New Moon)
149	Marcelo Brandão, Will and Igor Chafim	April	Go-go dancers (Superheroes: Captain America, Batman and Spider-Man)
150	Diego and Dirceu Duarte	May	Twin models
151	Marcelo, Carlos, Paulo Henrique and Niccolas	July	Models (Soccer Boys – Special: 2010 FIFA World Cup)
152	Marcelo Racanely	September	Model (Charm Boy on Silvio Santos's show)
153	Lucas Barreto	October	Model (former Fusiliers Marins)
154	Rafael Cardoso	November	Model (Fitness Boy)
155	Thiago Queiroz	Dezember	Model

=== 2011 ===
Issue	Cover	Month	Note
156	Bruno de Cursino	January	Model
157	Rodrigo Carvalho	February	Model/Big Brother Brasil 11 contestant
158	André Vidal	March	Model
159	Alan Esteves	April	Stripper
160	Evandro Belucco	June	Model
161	Eduardo Correa, Marlon Salles and Everton Gaeta	July	Go-go dancers (Trilogy of Pleasure)
162	Junior Moreno	August	Model
163	Maik Martins	October	Go-go dancer
164	Thiago Zanini	November	Go-go dancer
165	Kaue Castro	Dezember	Model

=== 2012 ===
Issue	Cover	Month	Note
166	Niccolas de Lucca	February	Model
167	Matheus Mazzafera	March	Personal stylist
168	Diego Veiga, Peter Petry, Lukas Rodrigues and Marlon Santana	April	Models (Special: The Week)
169	Lucas Rodrigues	May	Model
170	Vini Guervich, Paulo Fragoso, Patrick Miller, Fábio Dias and Kaká Rocha	July	Go-go dancers (Haus of Gogos – Special: Victoria Haus)
171	Victor, Sergi and Germán	September	Models (Special: ES Collection)
172	Bruno Camargo	November	Stripper
173	Den Wok	December	Model

=== 2013 ===
Issue	Cover	Month	Note
174	Rodrigo Mendonça	February	Model
175	Stephane Haffner	April	Model
176	Serge Henir	June	Model
