= Kleber Bambam =

Brazilian bodybuilder (born 1978)

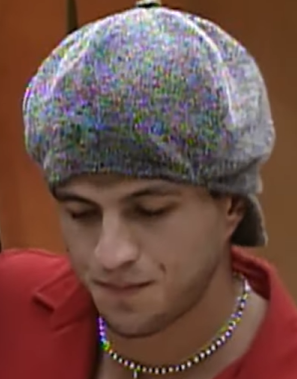
- Bambam in 2002
- Born: Kleber de Paula Pedra; February 14, 1978 (age 48); Campinas, São Paulo, Brazil
- Occupation: Bodybuilder
- Years active: 2002–2017, 2018–present
- Television: Big Brother Brasil
- Height: 1.85 m (6 ft 1 in)

Kleber de Paula Pedra (born 14 February 1978), known mostly as Kleber Bambam, is a Brazilian bodybuilder, actor and influencer. He is best known for winning the first edition of the program, Big Brother Brasil.

== Personal life ==
Born in Campinas, Kleber Bambam gained national notoriety after participating in the first season of the reality show Big Brother Brasil, where he was champion with 68% of the votes. After leaving the reality show, he worked as an actor on TV Globo, participating in the series A Turma de Didi. He also posed nude for G Magazine in January 2007. In 2013, he was invited to participate in that year's BBB, but withdrew and left the house after five days.

In May 2018, he decided to move to the United States to pursue a career as a bodybuilder. Three months later, he won the bodybuilding championship held in Las Vegas. Representing Brazil, Bambam lifted a weight of more than 100 kg, competed with athletes from several countries, came out on top in the Master category (over 35 years old) and also came third in the Senior category.

On February 25, 2024, Bambam was knocked out by boxer Popó after 36 seconds of fighting in the fourth edition of the Fight Music Show, in São Paulo.

== Filmography ==
=== Television ===
Year	Title	Role	Notes
2002	Big Brother Brasil	Himself	Season 1
2003–2005	A Turma do Didi	Bambam	Season 5–6–7–8
2005	Show do Tom	Bambam	Episode: "O Infeliz 2"
2008	B.O.F.E. de Elite	Himself	Special appearance
2012	Cante se Puder	Participant	Season 2
2013	Big Brother Brasil	Participant	Season 13
2017	Tá no Ar: a TV na TV	Himself	Episode: "Te Prendi Na TV"
2025	BBB: O Documentário	Himself	

=== Movies ===
Year	Title	Role
2003	Didi, o Cupido Trapalhão	Bambam
