= Vampetaço =

Brazilian form of trolling

Vampetaço is a form of trolling and cancelling perpetrated by Brazilians, where erotic pictures of the ex-footballer Vampeta for the G Magazine are posted on social media profiles. Sometimes, pictures of the porn actor Kid Bengala are posted instead.

== Background ==
Marcos André Batista Santos (Nazaré, 13 March 1974), better known as Vampeta, is a former Brazilian footballer that played for prominent soccer clubs, such as Corinthians, Flamengo, Fluminense, PSV Eindhoven, Internazionale and Paris Saint-Germain. Vampeta was also a part of the Brazil national football team squad that won the 2002 FIFA World Cup. In January 1999, reportedly after drinking 8 caipirinhas, Vampeta agreed to pose for G Magazine, the first Brazilian magazine openly targeted for the gay public. According to Vampeta, the main reason for the agreement was to obtain money for the restoration of Cinema Rio Branco in Nazaré, as the conditions of the cinema were precarious. The initiative came from the G Magazine journalist Ana Fadigas, and Vampeta received R$ 80 thousand as payment (around R$ 370 thousand in 2024). The pictures were published on 3 January and became the best-selling edition from G Magazine. The pictures were the first erection shown in the magazine and broke a taboo in soccer: the presence of homosexuals inside the teams started to be discussed.

On 30 September 2025, Vampeta announced he was going to publish another erotic photo session in two days and published a shirtless picture of himself recreating one of his photos from G-Magazine. The announcement turned out to be a publicity stunt for an online gambling website.

== Cancelling ==
Vampetaço (with the addition of the augmentative suffix -aço) is a form of trolling and cancelling used as protest against public people that post something considered unpleasant in their social media, especially Twitter. It uses humor to call for attention and viralize. Vampetaços are usually organized by social media profiles such as Jairme Arrependi. Vampeta said that he did not mind vampetaço, praising it in an interview.

According to Meteoro Brasil, vampetaço is a way internet users protect themselves from critiques against Brazil. According to Correio Braziliense, vampetaços popularized on Brazilian culture because Vampeta was known for his charisma and irreverence, and his nudes on G-Magazine challenged the status-quo and surprised the public. The outlet also brings that vampetaços are an evolution of the use of memes amongst soccer fans. But the sociologist Rodrigo França opined that the phenomenon is a "objectification or dehumanization of the black person", valued only for their physique or sex.

== Notable incidents ==
According to Vampeta, the first vampetaço was against an international singer that criticized Brazil for incidents in the Amazon rainforest.

=== 2020 ===
André Honorato, lead singer from Ossos Cruzados, created a political cartoon about Varg Vikernes exit from Twitter that was reposted by João Gordo, lead singer from Ratos de Porão.

During Big Brother Brasil 20, Manu Gavassi formed a group known as "Reasonable Fairies" to attack Babu Santana. The group was attacked by vampetaços by Santana fans as they understood he was being persecuted.

In July, the federal deputy Douglas Garcia (PSL) suffered a vampetaço for asking his followers to leak data from antifascists in his e-mail from the Legislative Assembly of São Paulo.

In July, Benfica's social media profile suffered a vampetaço for hiring Jorge Jesus, ex-Flamengo coach.

In August, Varg Vikernes, the neonazi lead singer from the black metal band Burzum, posted a list on Twitter of countries he hates the most. He classified Brazil in 4th and declared he wanted to see the country depopulated. He suffered a vampetaço and as an answer called Brazilians Untermenschen. He received so many pictures of Vampeta that his profile was put on private afterwards.

=== 2021 ===
In December, the Valorant gamer Jared "zombs" Gitlin suffered a vampetaço after writing on his social media that "[I] can't wait to beat your shit region again" as an answer to the Brazilian narrator Gustavo Melão.

=== 2023 ===
In July, the Instagram profile from São Paulo Zoo was hacked and the profile picture was changed to a naked picture from Vampeta. The image was deleted after a few minutes.

In October, Valencia fans suffered a vampetaço after calling Vini Jr. a "monkey".

=== 2024 ===
On 21 February, the Israel government suffered a vampetaço. The Twitter profile World of Statistics posted the Brazilian flag asking "what comes to mind when you think of Brazil?", and the Israel government replied "before or after Lula went full on Holocaust denier?" A few days prior, the President of Brazil Luiz Inácio Lula da Silva was classified as persona non grata by Israel for comparing the Gaza war with the Holocaust. The profile of the Ministry of Foreign Affairs Israel Katz also suffered a vampetaço for posting an AI generated image of Brazilians and Israelis hugging each other written "no one can sepparate [sic] our people – not even you, @LulaOficial". Vampeta's penis was censored with phrases such as "ceasefire" and "Israel is not a legitimate state", and calling Prime Minister of Israel Benjamin Netanyahu a war criminal.

On 25 February, a poster of a vampetaço was glued in a wall near FIESP during a protest supporting the ex-president of Brazil Jair Bolsonaro at Paulista Avenue, São Paulo. On the next day, Israel Katz received another vampetaço for divulgating pictures of the supporters carrying Israel flags to attack President Lula.

On 1 March, the conservative journalist Tucker Carlson suffered a vampetaço for interviewing the federal deputy Eduardo Bolsonaro (PL). Carlson spread several false stories during the interview, including that the CIA forged the 2022 Brazilian elections and the Lula government is pro-China.

In March, Wizards of the Coast suffered a vampetaço after the announcement that Magic: The Gathering and Dungeons & Dragons would not be localized to Portuguese and Simple Chinese anymore. The company blocked most people who engaged in the vampetaço, and Brazilians began sharing pictures of the Magic card "Greed".

On 31 March, during the 60 years anniversary of the beginning of the Military Dictatorship, the senator Hamilton Mourão (Republicanos – RS) exalted the authoritarian regime in his social media. As a response, profiles such as Felipe Neto and Marcelo Adnet organized a "herzogaço" against Mourão, where instead of posting Vampeta pictures, they posted pictures from the journalist Vladimir Herzog, killed by DOI-CODI in 1975.

On 7 April, Elon Musk suffered a vampetaço after criticizing supposed censorship from the Supreme Federal Court Ministry Alexandre de Moraes against Twitter, and asked for his impeachment.

In August, NFL player Marlon Humphrey suffered a vampetaço for answering a tweet from Simone Biles with "this is literally disgusting." Biles was revering Rebeca Andrade for conquering the gold medal during the 2024 Olympic Games in Paris.

On 28 October, a vampetaço against Ballon D'Or was organized for the supposed absence of Vini Jr. from the Bola de Ouro award.

=== 2025 ===
On 11 February, the satirical journal Sensacionalista wrote an article affirming that the Brazilian steel bars exported to the United States would contain a vampetaço after the Donald Trump administration announced 25% taxes on Brazilian steel and aluminium.

On 10 July, after U.S. president Donald Trump announced the imposition of high tariffs ("tarifaço") of 50% on imports from Brazil, Brazilians protested with a vampetaço, memes, AI-generated media, and replies both nationalistic and defending BRICS, on X (formerly Twitter) and on Instagram, leading the profile on the latter to restrict comments. Amongst the phrases censoring Vampeta's penis were references to Donald Trump being on Jeffrey Epstein client list; Trumpist actor Rob Schneider was also targeted by vampetaços for defending the American president, and the White House was also flooded with e-mails with memes and pictures of Vampeta. The satirical news outlet Sensacionalista published an article stating that "vampetaço" was chosen as the word of the year by the Oxford Dictionary. Over the following week, the Office of the United States Trade Representative (USTR) then opened an investigation against a number of Brazil's commercial practices, in particular the electronic payment system Pix (among other topics), which culminated in more waves of similar protests starting on July 16, including yet more vampetaços. The US Embassy in Brazil was also targeted with vampetaços for the statement of their interest on Brazil's rare-earth elements and that Brazilian Supreme Federal Court Minister Alexandre de Moraes has been persecuting Jair Bolsonaro and censoring the American freedom of speech. On 30 July, the Secretary of State Marco Rubio suffered a vampetaço for including Alexandre de Moraes on the Magnitsky Law.

On August, Haleon created an advertisement campaign where Vampeta and Craque Neto asked viewers to send a vampetaço with edited versions of the pictures containing the anti-inflammatory medicine CataflamPRO to supporters of relegated soccer teams to "ease" their pain.

On 30 August, the United States men's national basketball team social media was flooded with memes, including vampetaços, after losing for the Brazil men's national basketball team on the semifinals of FIBA AmeriCup.

On 17 November, German prime-minister Friedrich Merz suffered a vampetaço after comparing Brazil with Germany in the end of COP 30 with terms that were perceived as pejorative. He has said that everyone in his delegation was happy to leave Belém.

=== 2026 ===
On 9 August, Carlos A. Gimenez was targeted by vampetaços after posting on Twitter an AI-generated image implying President Lula would be kidnapped in a near future, similarly to what happened to Nicolás Maduro.

On 11 August, the United States Department of State suffered a vampetaço after endorsing the Monroe Doctrine on Twitter.

On 25 August, Wilker Leão, a federal deputy candidate for the New Party in Brasília, went to University of Brasília (UnB) as part of his political campaign. He was fingered during the act and one day later he asked his followers to identify the perpetrator. Wilker was already expelled in 2025 from UnB for exposing professors and students on YouTube videos, and the request for identifying another student made him target of a vampetaço.
