= Leo Santana (singer) =

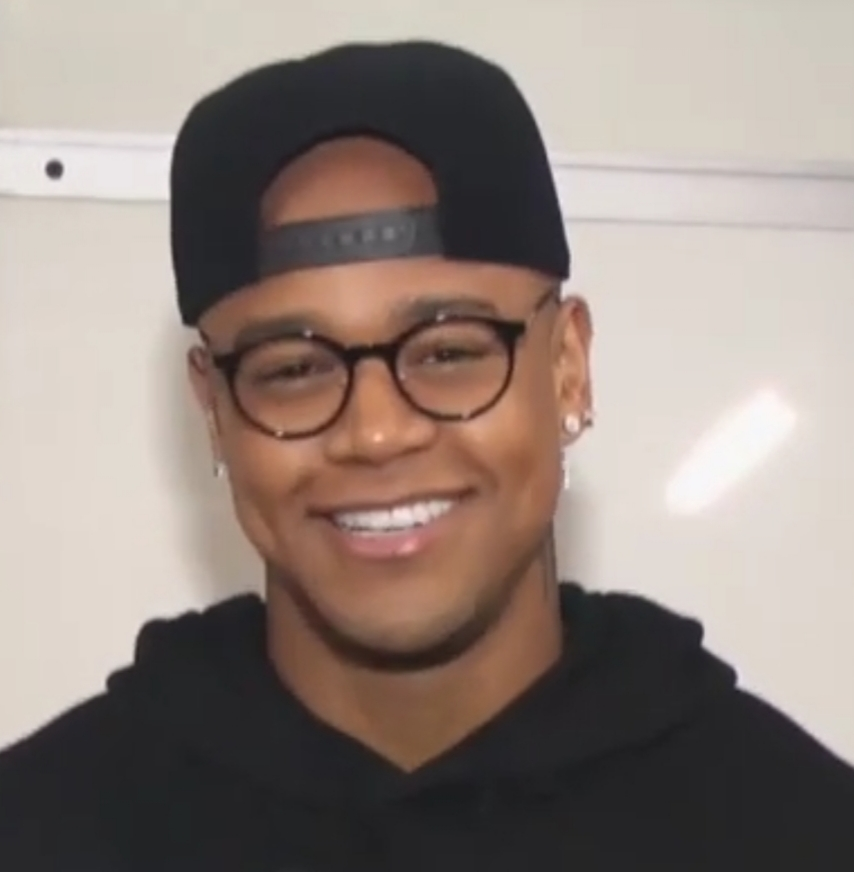
- Santana in 2019

Background information
- Born: Leandro Silva de Santana; 22 April 1988 (age 38); Salvador, Bahia, Brazil
- Genre: Pagode baiano
- Occupations: Singer, composer, multi-instrumentalist
- Years active: 2001—present
- Label: Universal Music

Leandro Silva de Santana Improta (born 22 April 1988), better known by his artistic name Leo Santana, is a Brazilian singer, composer, and percussionist. He first achieved success as a member of the band Parangolé, and would afterwards have a successful solo career, releasing hit singles throughout the 2010s and 2020s.

== Biography ==
The son of Lourival and Marinalva Santana, Léo was born on 22 April 1988 in Salvador. He was raised in the Boa Vista do Lobato neighborhood, in the Bahian capital's periphery, where, since he was an adolescent, had dreamed of working in music. While his family had reunited at their grandparent's house in São Domingos, in Bahia's interior, he had the custom of dancing and singing with his friends. Before starting his artistic career, however, he worked selling baked chickens on the beach and making cocktails in bars, but did not make much money doing so. After sometime working as an assistant for a barber, and with much effort he opened his own barbershop and as such helped to pay for the expenses at home.

== Artistic career ==
=== 2001–13: Parangolé ===
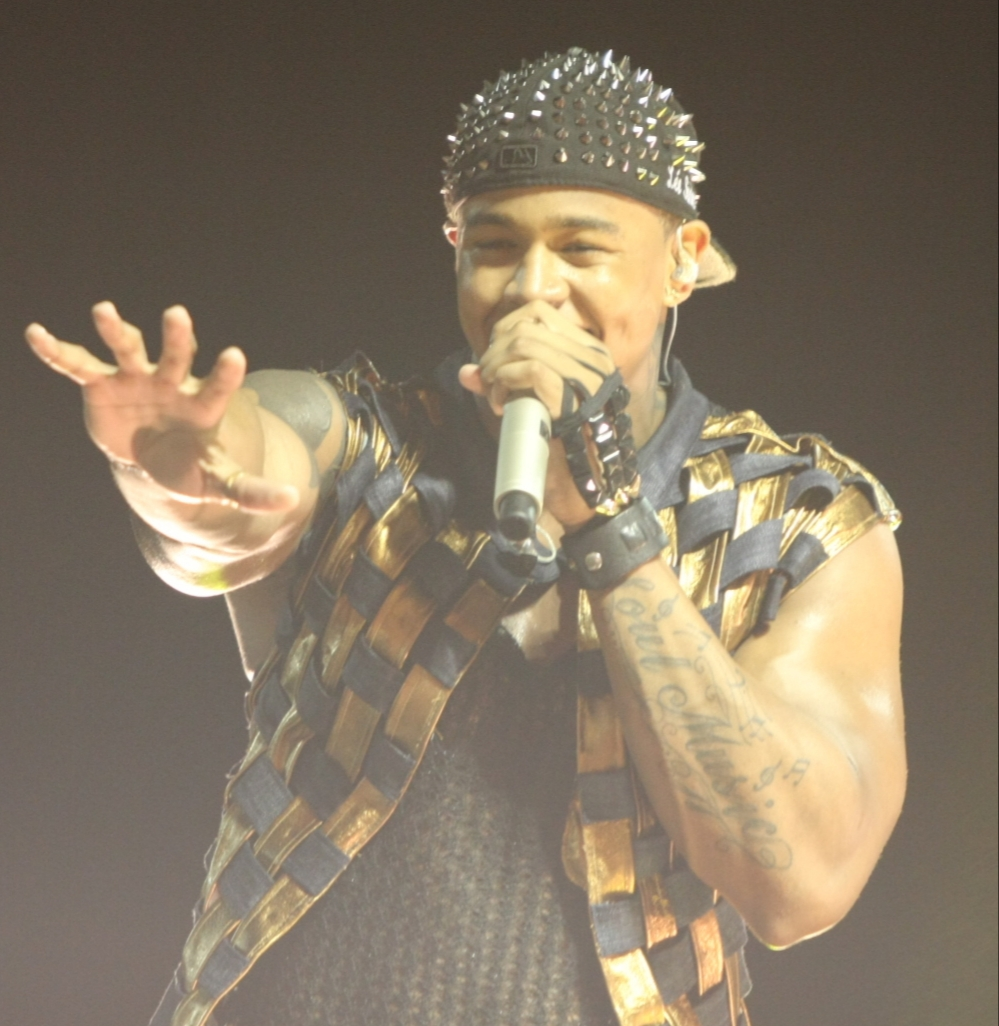
Santana during a show, 2013.

Santana began his career under the artistic name Leo Silva, and went on to play percussion for Som Bahia. His first instrument while with the group was an old cavaquinho given to him by his mother, and afterwards began to play the pandeiro in a samba band in his community called Simplicidade Maior. However, due to him wanting to follow a career as a vocalist, he decided to leave the band. He afterwards joined the band Zairê, which later came to be called Garotos de Programa. Soon afterwards, Santana was invited to join the band Pegadha de Guettho, with which he was a member of for a year. He went on to join with his friends Apert Play, all of them without great success. However, with this last band, his friend Jean Nanico, a member of Parangolé, which had recently fired their main vocalist Bambam, decided to show a demo CD to the bands producer, and Santana was invited to become part of the group.

Now going as Leo Santana, the singer suffered prejudice, as with the constant change in band vocalists, they did not believe that he would remain with the band for that long. However, after his arrival, the band changed their style and their shows would go on to have a diversified lineup with the structure of the last generation. They had their first success at the time with their song "Sou Favela". In 2009, Leo wrote together with lNenel, the founder of Parangolé, the song "Rebolation", their contribution to 2010's Carnaval celebrations. The song became a summer hit, and with it the group went on to have international success, beating records at the charts in Angola and Portugal. With this feat, Leo and the band earned a Guinness Book record for having the most played song in the world in 2010. Along with being a commercial success, it was also a critical success, receiving the Troféu Dodô e Osmar in the Best Song category. In December 2013, after five years as the band's vocalist, Santana announced that, in March 2014, he would leave the band, as he felt that his name recognition was strong enough to start a solo career.

=== 2014–present: Solo career ===
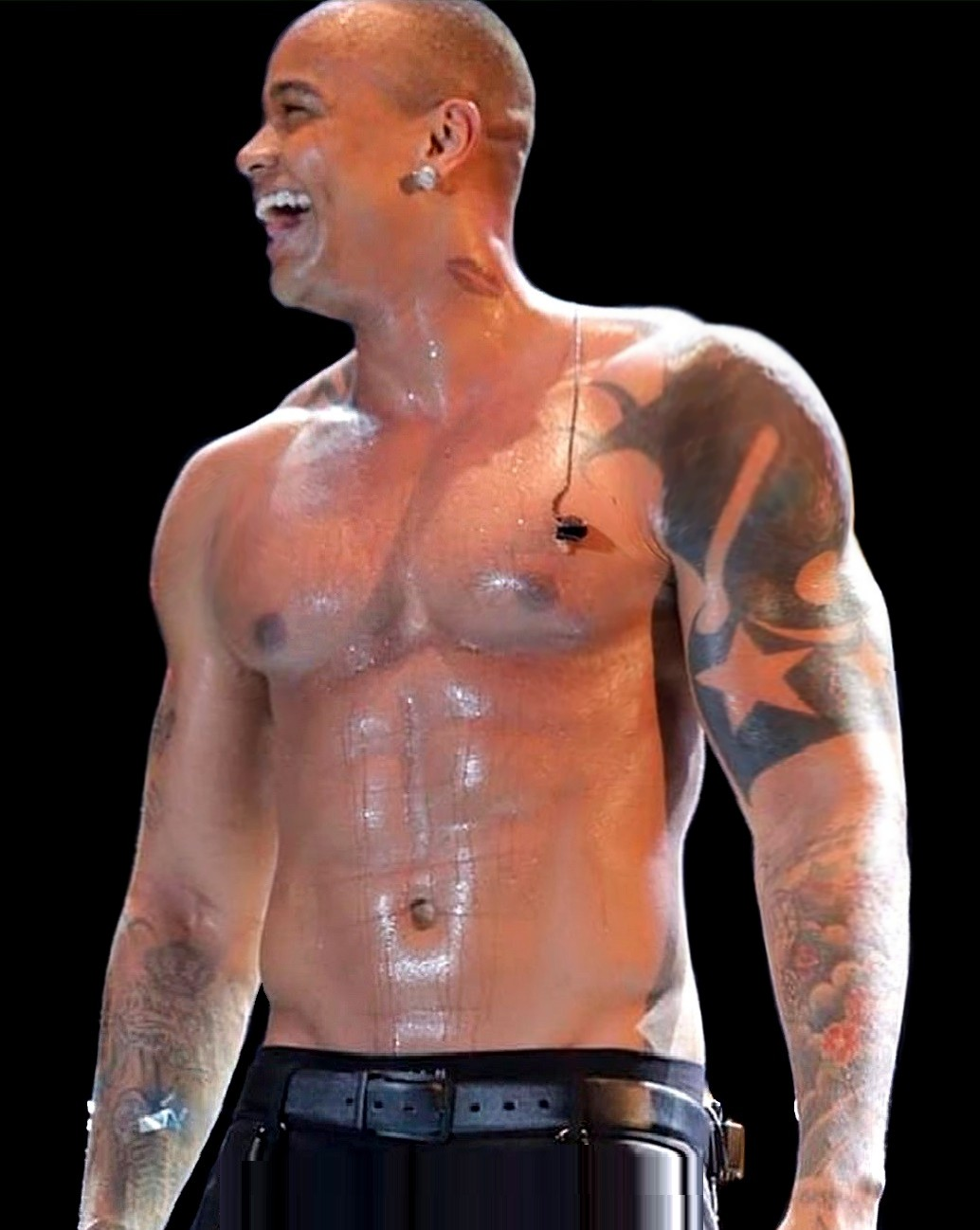
Santana during a performance in 2020

After Carnaval, he started on his solo career with a launch show for his tour, titled #LSTour2014, on 28 March with a crowd of 60,000 people in Cajazeiras. In April, he released his first solo song released titled "Fenômeno". The song, which has influences from Angolan swing, was composed by himself and Rodriguinho, and which includes a guest appearance from Angolan singer Anselmo Ralph. On 11 April, he released his first promotional solo CD, Uma Nova História, with many tracks going on to major success in the following years. On 9 December 2015, he released his first DVD, titled #Deboche, which included singles such as: "Abana", "Se Eu Te Trair a Culpa É Sua", and "Deboche". This would be followed up by his second studio album, Super Ensaio, on 27 January 2016, with the participation of singers such as Wesley Safadão and Saulo Fernandes. On 25 November, he would release his first DVD, #Bailedasantinha, which included performances by Marília Mendonça and included singles such as "Santinha", "Vidro Fumê", and "Um Tal de Toma".

On 25 May 2018, Santana released his first EP, Inovando, which included as participants Maiara & Maraisa and had "10 Beijos de Ruas" and "Uma Lá, Duas Cá" as singles. This would be followed by the 8 November 2018 release of his album No Seu Paredão. On 30 November 2018, he would release his second DVD, Ao Vivo em Goiânia, with unreleased songs and some of his prior successes. In May, he released the single "Pretinho Tipo A", with the participation of Thiaguinho. 8 June 2019 saw the release of the EP O De Sempre No Mesmo Padrão, which had the lone single "Olha Como Está a Minha Mesa". In November, he launched the first part of his DVD Levada do Gigante, including the single "Contatinho", in a partnership with Anitta.

== Personal life ==
In 2011, Santana had a brief relationship with model and presenter Nicole Bahls. In February 2017, he began dating dancer Lore Improta, with whom he became engaged to after 6 months of dating. They broke up in December 2017, and again in March and July 2018, but they would get together again in October that same year. The relationship would end for the 4th time at the end of May 2019, but by June 2020, they were together again. In February 2021, they married at his house in Salvador, in a family only attended by close family members due to the COVID-19 pandemic. Soon after, they announced that they would have their first child. After they got married, Leo and Lore adopted each other's surnames.

Their first child, Liz, was born at the Portuguese Hospital in Salvador, on 26 September 2021.

=== Controversies ===
In April 2020, Santana was criticized on social media, accused of making donations to gain visibility. This occurred after a fundraising livestream that he hosted during the course of the COVID-19 pandemic, which donated ten basic packages to every 10,000 people that watched the show. In response to the criticisms, Santana said that it was wrongly interpreted and that he would make the donations regardless of the amount of people. He also said that "no human being has an obligation to help anyone".

== Discography ==
=== Studio albums ===
- Uma Nova História (2014)
- Super Ensaio (2016)

=== Live albums ===
- #Deboche (2015)
- #Bailedasantinha (2016)
- No Seu Paredão (2018)
- Ao Vivo em Goiânia (2018)
- Levada do Gigante (2019)

== Awards and nominations ==
Year	Award	Category	Nominated	Result	Ref.
2009	Troféu Dodô e Osmar	Singer Revelation	Leo Santana	Won	
2010	Troféu Band Folia	Singer Revelation	Leo Santana	Won	
2010	Troféu Dodô e Osmar	Best Singer	Leo Santana	Won	
2011	Troféu Dodô e Osmar	Best Singer	Leo Santana	Won	
2017	Troféu Band Folia	Carnaval Music	"Santinha"	Won	
2017	Prêmio Contigo! Online	Best Singer	Leo Santana	Nominated	
2017	Prêmio Contigo! Online	Carnaval Hit	"Santinha"	Won	
2018	Prêmio Jovem Brasileiro	Best Singer	Leo Santana	Nominated	
2018	Prêmio Contigoǃ Online	Carnaval Hit	"Várias Novinhas"	Won	
2018	Multishow Brazilian Music Awards	Best Singer	Leo Santana	Nominated	
2019	Troféu Internet	Best Singer	Leo Santana	Nominated	
2019	Troféu Band Folia	Carnaval Music	"Crush Blogueirinha"	Nominated	
2019	Prêmio Jovem Brasileiro	Hit of the Year	"Crush Blogueirinha"	Nominated	
2019	MTV Millennial Awards	Crush of the Year	Leo Santana	Nominated	
2020	Troféu Internet	Best Singer	Leo Santana	Pending	
2024	Prêmio Potências	Artist of the Year	Leo Santana	Nominated	
