= Gracyanne Barbosa =

Brazilian fitness model and Carnaval dancer

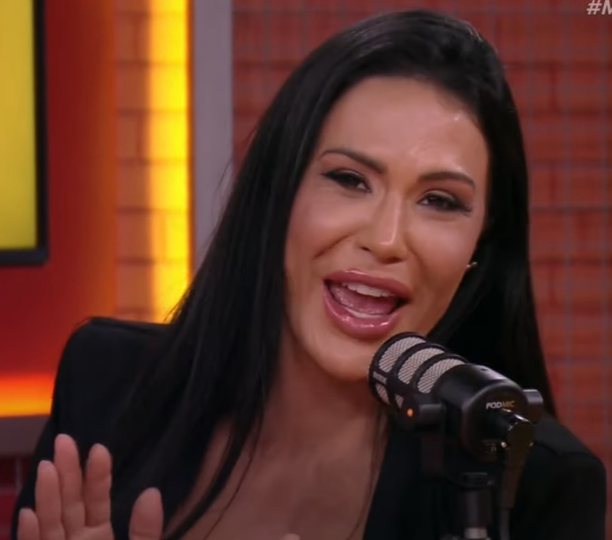
- Barbosa in 2025
- Born: Gracyanne Jacobina Barbosa Vieira; September 20, 1982 (age 43); Campo Grande, Mato Grosso do Sul, Brazil
- Education: Allegedly the Federal University of Rio de Janeiro (UFRJ), however the university itself has denied this claim.
- Occupations: Model, Dancer
- Height: 1.74 m (5 ft 9 in)
- Spouse: Marcelo Pires Vieira ("Belo")
- Website: http://gracyanneoficial.blogspot.com/

Gracyanne Jacobina Barbosa Vieira (born 20 September 1982) is a Brazilian fitness model and Carnaval dancer.

== Early life ==
Barbosa moved from her native town Campo Grande to Rio de Janeiro at the age of 16 to attend law school at the Federal University of Rio de Janeiro. She wanted to become a judge to overcome the financial difficulties her family faced in Mato Grosso do Sul. She lived in a hostel and worked odd jobs.

== Career ==
However, she faced financial difficulties and started to work as a dancer, soon joining the axé band Tchakabum in 1999. In January 2007, she was featured on the cover of Playboy. She left Tchakabum at the end of 2008 and launched a modeling career.

=== Rainha de bateria ===
Barbosa has been foremost known to the Brazilian public as a rainha de bateria for various samba schools at the Rio Carnival and São Paulo Carnival.

- 2007: Acadêmicos do Salgueiro
- 2008-2009: Estação Primeira de Mangueira - Império de Casa Verde
- 2010: Unidos de Vila Isabel - Império de Casa Verde
- 2011: Paraíso do Tuiuti - Império de Casa Verde - Unidos de Manguinhos
- 2012: Unidos da Tijuca - Unidos de Manguinhos
- 2013: Estação Primeira de Mangueira / Unidos do Jacarezinho (madrinha)
- 2014-2016: X-9 Paulistana
- 2018-: União da Ilha do Governador

=== Modeling ===
Barbosa posed for the cover of Revista Sexy December 2011 issue.

== Personal life ==
On 18 May 2012, Barbosa married pagode and samba singer Belo who was formerly married to Viviane Araújo, another famous rainha de bateria. The ceremony was held at Candelária Church in Rio de Janeiro.

Alongside her sister Giovanna, she entered Big Brother Brasil as a contestant in its 25th season.

=== Social media controversy ===
In 2012, photos of Barbosa squatting were uploaded to social media, followed by a workout video. Barbosa's ostensible squat weight (around 495 lbs) caused "an uproar on the bodybuilding forums for months", leading to debates at popular websites such as Bodybuilding.com on the authenticity of the weight plates used by her.
