= Parangolé =

Brazilian pagode baiano band

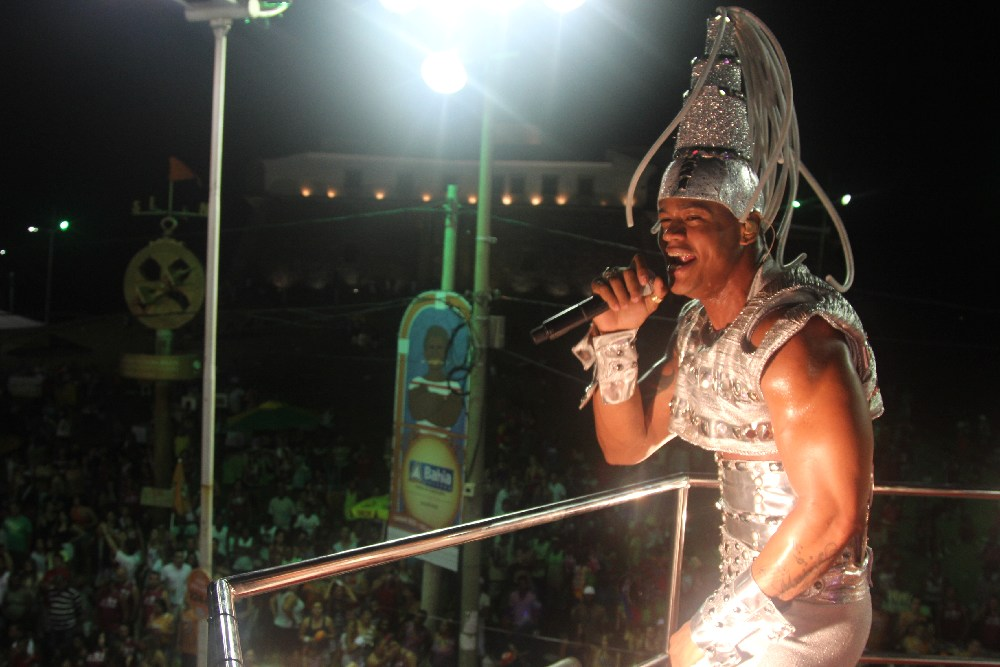
- Parangolé at Carnaval 2012 in Salvador (with lead singer Leo Santana pictured)

Background information
- Origin: Salvador, Bahia, Brazil
- Genre: Pagode baiano
- Years active: 1997–present
- Members: Lincoln Senna; Diego Soares; Biriba; Everton Soares; Big Big; David Lelê; Amaral Percussa; Mascote; Juninho City; Andre Merenda
- Past members: see Former Members section

Parangolé is a Brazilian pagode baiano band. Formed in 1997, the group has become one of the foremost names of the genre.

Currently led by Lincoln Senna, the band is known for hits such as "Balacobaco", "Rebolation", and "Abaixa Que é Tiro".

== History ==
=== Beginnings ===
Parangolé began in 1997 in the Federação neighborhood of Salvador, at a bar called "Bar de Dona Maria". Every evening, Adriano Nenel and Nailton Alves would meet to play cards and would always, at the end of their time together, would play pagode, mixing samba, salsa, axé, and percussions. The sound was well received by those who passed by the place, and the movement spread throughout the city. After some time, they heard someone comment: "what parangolé (useless speech) is happening with those in Federação?" This gave rise to the group's name, Parangolé.

=== Rise ===
In 2000, as he became a pastor, Nailton began a career in gospel music and left the band. The band would be led between 2000 and 2002 by Mucinho and had successes such as "Na chapa" and "Chamadinha". The group was afterwards led by Paulinho, who recorded songs such as "Swing do Cavaco", "Timanamanô", and "Colé Véio", launching the group to success in their home state of Bahia. A double live album was released in 2002, but did not achieve the same success. The band also was led by Klebinho, who rerecorded the double CD and had a major role in the growth of Parangolé.

Later on, in 2004, the group was led by Eddye (Edcity, currently pursuing a solo career and who was the former vocalist for the band Fantasmão), with the cavaquinho player Nenel singing in a duo with him, recording the hits "Delícia" and "Baculejo". They later released an homonymous album in 2005 that did not garner much success.

In 2006, after becoming a very popular band, Bambam started to work alongside Nenel, who stopped playing the cavaco, gaining more space in the band. Having hits such as "Só as Cabeças", and "Problemática", their album, A Verdade da Cidade, was released later that year. The album became a major success in Salvador, and along with this, the song "Fera Ferida" came along with it the band's first music video, also recorded in Salvador. The clip showed the members of the band coming together, playing their instruments and singing on a roof, with the people of the community going through their daily routine.

=== Bambam and Nenel's exit ===
Not viewed as a positive influence on the band by the other members, Bambam became involved with another fight with the band's managers, which culminated in his leaving the band in December 2007. According to sources, in their last show with them, which took place in Salvador, Bambam did not want to adhere to the rules of the event and began to disagee with the band's producer. After he was dismissed from the group, Nenel decided to leave Parangolé to become part of the band LevaNóiz. An album that took its name from their song “Sou Parangoleiro”, announced by Nenel in their last DVD, was never released.

After they both left, a partner of the band showed a CD demo to the then-vocalist of the band Apert Play to Salvador Produções, the company that oversaw Parangolé. Afterwards, around the time of the 2008 Carnaval celebrations, Léo Santana assumed the role as vocalist.

=== Restart, death of Rogério Abreu and Dinastia Parangoleira ===
With Santana’s entrance to the band, the band assumed a new “face” and definitively established itself as one of the most powerful names in the music scene in Bahia. Their performances began to have varied productions, such as a diversified set of scenarios and figures, which opened their event producers eyes to the group.

Making the new face official, Parangolé released their 2007 album Dinastia Parangoleira: 10 Anos. This album contained 20 tracks, among them "Sou Favela" - their biggest success so far in the "Léo Santana era", with guest participation by the bands LevaNóiz and Nenel, and “Desce a Madeira”, songs that were widely requested on radio at the time.

On 17 April 2008, bassist Rogério Abreu and his friend Márcio Oliveira Gomes were killed during an assault attempt near Condomínio Pararela Park where he lived. According to testimonies, they were approached by two men in a motorcycle while they left for university. At reacting to the situation, the two were shot multiple times. The musician was taken to São Rafael hospital, but succumbed to his injuries. The following day, he was buried in the city of Pojuca, where he was born.

On 12 July of that year, their DVD Dinastia Parangoleira: Ao Vivo was released. It was a super production that brought the band to prominence nationally. They relied on the equipment of the last generation of members: a mega-structure on stage, sound, lighting, and effects. The live music video was recorded with 25,000 people in attendance, and also "Fera Ferida", and brought together what the band did best throughout their existence. They paid tribute to Abreu in the song "Anjo Parangoleiro".

=== "Rebolation" ===
Launched as their working song for the 2010 Carnaval season, “Revolution”, composed by Santana and Nenel, and was an absolute success at Carnaval in Salvador. The song won them awards including theTroféu Dodô e Osmar for best music. It went on to be performed throughout Brazil and became a major part of their repertoire on tour. Dinastia Parangoleira: Ao Vivo gained a new edition with clips for Rebolation and Sou Favela, which was rereleased nationwide. The hit entered the national charts, reaching number 5 on the Billboard Brasil chart and number 5 on Brasil Hot 100 Airplay, in April 2010. Parangolé, at that point, became not just a success in Bahia but throughout Brazil.

The band had already participated in the biggest festivals and micaretas throughout the company, such as the Festival de Verão de Salvador, where they performed 3 times and gained further visibility in the media and on stage. They performed with major names in both the music scene in Bahia and the national music scene.

=== Negro Lindo and Todo Mundo Gosta ===
Following the success of "Rebolation", Parangolé released in 2010 the album Negro Lindo, which included 13 unreleased songs, most of which were authored or co-authored by Santana. The album included hits such as "Negro Lindo", the titular song from the album, and "Tchubirabirom". The latter was used as their song for Salvador's 2011 Carnaval.

Just three months after the release of Negro Lindo, the band already began to prepare for the recording of another live CD/DVD. Recorded on 17 April 2011 as the main attraction at Samba Salvador, Todo Mundo Gosta, it included various unreleased tracks among the successes. The principal hits include "Madeira de Lei" (their song for Carnaval 2012), and "Leite Condensado", recorded with a special appearance from Rodriguinho. Another invite to the recording was Thiaguinho, who appeared on "Negro Lindo". The DVD was released on 6 November 2011.

=== Change to brand and Diferenciado ===
Starting in 2013, the group began to be called "Léo Santana & Parangolé". The change in their name was already seen as in fact the first steps towards Santana's departure from the group. According to the group's advisor, the change in their brand was just a reflection of the growth of Santana's popularity as part of the band. Along with this, the singer announced the launch of a new album, titled Diferenciado, which mixes various rhythms from inspirations such as funk carioca, samba, pop, zouk, and axé, with a guest appearance by Saulo Fernandes on "Sossego". The album was released on 9 July 2013, being distributed together with the magazine Correio.

=== Santana's departure ===
On the Vip column on Jornal Correio, it was announced that Santana would leave Parangolé after Carnaval 2014, and would announce his departure again with the trio. Santana's advisor denied that there was a marked date and place, but that there would be the possibility of Santana's leaving, and that he would have already mentioned this. Beyond that, there would already be singers chosen to replace Santana, such as André Ramon, at that point the lead singer of LevaNóiz, Tony Salles, the leader of Raghatoni at the time, and Biel Rios of Banda Pagodão. The business manager of LevaNóiz, Luis Cláudio, confirmed that Ramon was chosen to replace Santana, but that the decision would depend on him. Meanwhile, Júnior Santana, the business manager of Banda Pagodão, and Tony Salles, through his press secretary, denied that there had been a proposal for the singers to become part of the group. On 25 October, the band performed on Universo Axé on TV Aratu, an affiliate of SBT in Bahia, where Santana assumed he would continue his solo career, but this was still being planned with their business managers and the other musicians. Afterwards, on Domingo Espetacular, Santana, Nenel, and their manager Marcelo Brito, would officially confirm that Santana would leave Parangolé after Carnaval. They also announced that the group would go on hiatus and would choose the new lead singer after coming back from hiatus.

Santana bid farewell and performed his last show with Parangolé at a show in Porto Seguro on 6 March.

=== Reformation and Baianidade Total ===
On 10 March, Salvador Produções announced in a note released to the press that Tony Salles is the new vocalist of the group, and that soon that would go to the studio to record a new album, later releasing the title, "Baianidade Total". The album was released on 22 April 2014, presenting the new lineup of the band and the return of Nenel to be the second vocalist and the cavaco player. The album included 9 unreleased songs, including "Tchuco no Tchaco", a new song, as well as rerecordings of popular songs by Parangolé, Raghatoni, Shake Style and Timbalada, along with the participations of Igor Kannário on "Bala e Fogo", Junior Lord on "Série Limitada", and guitarrist Bruno Michel on "Panhadinha". Santana's dancers at the time were replaced by Adriel Torres and Dam Fernandes, whom mixed steps from pagode baiano with break dance.

=== Salles' departure and Lincoln Senna's arrival ===
On 19 July 2024, Salles announced that he would leave Parangolé to pursue a solo career. He completed the show schedule for the band until the beginning of November of that year. He mentioned that he wanted to change his musical style in his new phase.

In October 2024, the company responsible for their management announced that singer Lincoln Senna, former vocalist of the band Duas Medidas, replaced Salles.

== Carnaval ==
Parangolé is one of the four main bands of the Salvador Carnaval, alongside Psirico, Léo Santana, and Harmonia do Samba. Over the last few years, the group became an attraction among various blocos, not just those who played pagode, but also among those who divided time with axé bands, very notable among the pagode bands in Carnaval.

=== Awards and nominations: Troféu Dodô e Osmar ===
- 2009 - Léo Santana won the "Revelation Singer" from Carnaval for "Sou Favela", unseating the favorite Eddye, a former vocalist with Parangolé and then lead singer of pagode band Fantasmão.
- 2010 - This year, they won 3 awards: Santana for Best Singer, Parangolé as Best Pagode Group, and "Rebolation" for Best Song, the most contested category.
- 2011 - Parangolé took the award for Best Pagode Group for the 2nd year running. The group was also nominated for the categories for Best Singer with Santana and Best Music for "Tchubirabirom".

== Members ==
=== Current line-up ===
- Lincoln Senna - vocal
- Diego Soares - backing vocals
- Andre Merenda - guitar
- Biriba - bass
- Everton Soares - keyboard
- Big Big - drums
- David Lelê- torpedos
- Amaral Percussa - timbau, congas
- O Mascote - surdo
- Junninho City - bacurinha, timbau, congas, box

=== Former members ===
- Nailton Alves - voice
- Nenel Capinan - Cavaquinho, voice
- Mucinho - voice
- Paulinho - voice
- Klebinho - voice
- Eddye - voice
- Bambam - voice
- Leo Santana - voice
- Júlio César - backing vocal
- C'Du Guedes - backing vocal
- Wandy Matheus - backing vocal
- André Merenda - guitar
- Luiz Carlos "Pica-Pau" - guitar
- Igor "Salsicha" - guitar
- Rogério Abreu - double bass
- Victor Leony - double bass
- Bruno "Zum Zum" - keyboard
- Tito Vinícius - keyboard
- Ricardo - keyboard
- Pé de Pato - keyboard
- Sandrinho - keyboard
- Cavaduras - drums
- Fabrício Batera - drums
- Bola Batera - drums
- Paulo Nick - drums
- Gilmar DJ Jilmar
- Leandro
- Deilton - timbau, congas, repinique, snare drum, pandeiro, surdo
- Rafael Silva - timbal, torpedo, pandeiro
- Luciano Piu - timbal, congas, atabaque
- Binho Brasil - caixa, effects
- Jadson - repinique
- Emerson Timbal - repinique
- Thor Cruz - surdo, electronics
- Selva Rodrigues - alto saxophone
- Hugo Sanbone - trombone, baritone horn
- Everaldo Pequeno - trumpet
- Tony Salles - voice

== Discography ==
=== Studio albums ===
- 2005 - Studio Com Eddy
- 2006 - Fera Ferida
- 2007 - A Verdade da Cidade
- 2008 - Dinastia Parangoleira
- 2010 - Negro Lindo
- 2013 - Diferenciado
- 2014 - Baianidade Total
- 2017 - O Novo

=== Live albums ===
- 2002 - Parangolé Ao Vivo CD DUPLO
- 2007 - Parangolé Ao Vivo no Muquiverão
- 2008 - Dinastia Parangoleira: Ao Vivo 10 ANOS
- 2011 - Todo Mundo Gosta
- 2016 - Ao Vivo no Salvador Fest
- 2017 - #SoltaOParango

=== DVDs ===
- 2008 - Dinastia Parangoleira: Ao Vivo
- 2011 - Todo Mundo Gosta
- 2016 - Ao Vivo no Salvador Fest
- 2017 - SoltaOParango
- 2019 - O Som Que Vem da Rua

=== Singles ===
| Year | Single | Peak chart positions | | | Album |
| Year | Single | BRA | BRA Bill. | POR | Album |
|---|---|---|---|---|---|
| 2005 | "Delícia" | — | — | — | Parangolé |
| 2006 | "A Santa" | — | — | — | A Verdade da Cidade |
| 2006 | "Fera Ferida" | — | — | — | A Verdade da Cidade |
| 2007 | "Só as Cabeças" | — | — | — | A Verdade da Cidade |
| 2007 | "Bonde de Deus" | — | — | — | Dinastia Parangoleira: 10 Anos |
| 2008 | "Mamoeiro" | — | — | — | Dinastia Parangoleira: Ao Vivo |
| 2008 | "Balacubaco" | — | — | — | Dinastia Parangoleira: Ao Vivo |
| 2009 | "Sou Favela" | — | — | — | Dinastia Parangoleira: Ao Vivo |
| 2009 | "Rebolation" | 1 | 5 | 2 | Dinastia Parangoleira: Ao Vivo |
| 2009 | "Só as Cadeiras" | — | — | — | Dinastia Parangoleira: Ao Vivo |
| 2010 | "Negro Lindo" | — | — | — | Negro Lindo |
| 2011 | "Tchubirabirom" | 21 | — | — | Negro Lindo |
| 2011 | "Leite Condensado" | 21 | — | — | Todo Mundo Gosta |
| 2012 | "Madeira de Lei" | 45 | — | — | Todo Mundo Gosta |
| 2012 | "A Dança do Arrocha" | 87 | — | — | |
| 2013 | "Me Domina" | 51 | — | — | Diferenciado |
| 2013 | "Sossego" | — | — | — | Diferenciado |
| 2014 | "Nossa Cor" | — | — | — | |
| 2014 | "Traição Trocada" | — | — | — | |
| 2014 | "Dança Legal" | — | — | — | |
| 2016 | "Sarra na Pista Novinha" | | | | |

=== Videography ===
- 2006 - Fera Ferida
- 2009 - Rebolation
- 2009 - Sou Favela
- 2010 - Negro Lindo
- 2010 - Tchubirabirom
- 2012 - A Dança do Arrocha
- 2013 - Me Domina
- 2014 - Nossa Cor
- 2019 - Abaixa que é tiro
