= Pagode baiano =

Brazilian musical genre

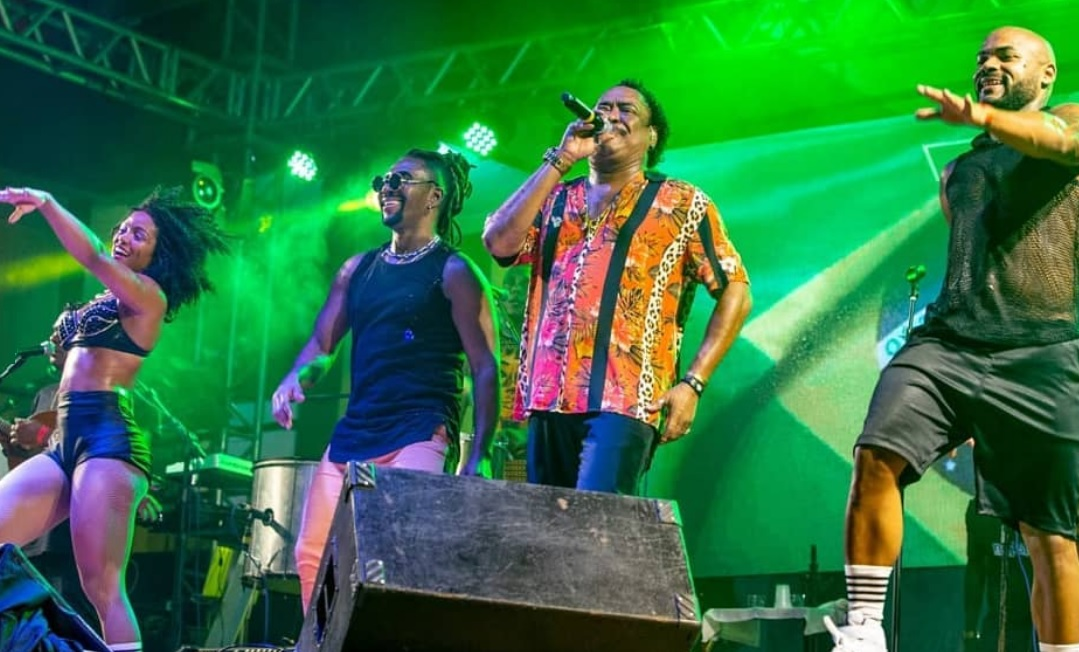
- É o Tchan! in 2020
- Stylistic origins: Samba reggae; samba de roda; pagode; samba duro
- Cultural origins: 1990s and 2000s in Salvador, Bahia, Brazil

Subgenres
- Arrochadeira

Pagode baiano (also called pagodão, swingueira and quebradeira) is a Brazilian musical genre created in Salvador, Bahia, originating from the mixture of samba-reggae and pagode, with the main difference being the inclusion of percussion, a faster rhythm and generally accompanied by choreography. Because it is a musical genre that emerged in Bahia, it is wrongly confused with axé music, mainly because both styles were fashionable in Brazil between the 1990s and 2000s.

== History ==
The genre gained momentum around 1994, influenced by Bahia samba duro and Rio de Janeiro pagode. The genre's first success was Dança do Tchaco, by Tonho Matéria. At that time, the group Gera Samba was also emerging, releasing an independently recorded CD that sold well.

From 1995 onwards, with the phenomenon of É o Tchan!, the genre gained national prominence. Other groups emerged, such as Harmonia do Samba, Terra Samba, Raça Pura, Patrulha do Samba, Companhia do Pagode and Gang do Samba. In the late 1990s, despite the name pagode "baiano" (from Bahia), groups focused on the style emerged in other parts of the country, such as Tchakabum from Rio de Janeiro and Axé Blond from São Paulo, which were also very successful. In the 2000s, other notable groups emerged, such as Psirico, Parangolé, Pagod'art, LevaNóiz, Guig Guetho, Oz Bambaz, Saiddy Bamba, Fantasmão, Swing do P, Black Style and A Bronkka, Leo Santana.

== Characteristics and style ==
It is a rhythm from Bahia, derived from samba-reggae, from samba de roda from Recôncavo Baiano (and its variations), from samba duro and rhythms from Candomblé, characterized by striking melodic lines and percussion, with emphasis on the repique, which plays in the characteristic accent of the music. Pagode baiano also often uses samba instruments such as pandeiro and cavaquinho. It differs from axé, which is usually played with guitar, drums and wind instruments.

Pagodão is characterized by double entendre lyrics with simple choruses, and is more popular among peripheral areas. The genre is often criticized for moral reasons, since its lyrics have strong sexual connotations or sexualization of bodies. In the late 2000s and subsequent years there was a cultural incorporation of other popular rhythms such as funk carioca within pagode baiano, notably popularized by the band Black Style (with singer Robyssão and his later solo career) in what became known as "pagofunk".
