= Big Brother Brasil 1 =

- Season 1
- Presented by: Pedro Bial; Marisa Orth
- No. of days: 64
- No. of housemates: 12
- Winner: Kleber Bambam
- Runner-up: Vanessa Pascale
- No. of episodes: 64

Release
- Original network: Globo
- Original release: January 29 – April 2, 2002

Season chronology
- Next → Big Brother Brasil 2

Big Brother Brasil 1, known at the time only as Big Brother Brasil was the debut season of Big Brother Brasil, the Brazilian version of the international reality show Big Brother, which premiered on January 29, 2002 on Rede Globo.

The show was produced by Endemol Globo and originally presented by journalist Pedro Bial and actress Marisa Orth. However, Orth left her hosting duties early in the series but continued making appearances in pre-taped segments.

The prize award was R$500.000 without tax allowances, plus a R$30.000 prize offered to the runner-up and a R$20.000 prize offered to the housemate in third place.

The winner was 24-year-old dancer Kleber de Paula, from Campinas, São Paulo.

== Overview ==
There were twelve housemates competing for the grand prize. The season lasted 64 days nearly a two-three weeks shorter than most seasons, making this the shortest season of the Brazilian series of Big Brother.

=== Reunion show ===
The reunion was hosted by Pedro Bial and aired on April 7, 2002. All the former housemates attended.

== Housemates ==
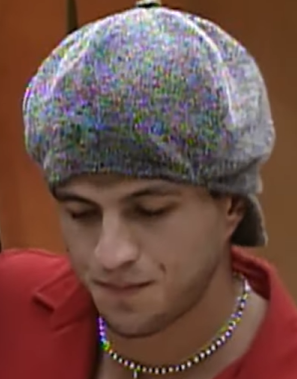
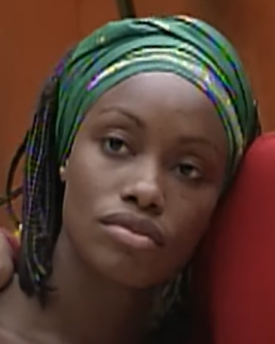
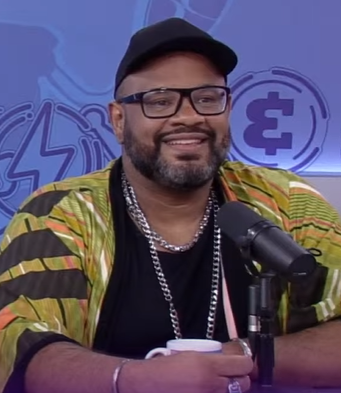
Kleber de Paula (Winner), Vanessa Pascale (Runner-up) and André Gabeh (Third place), the finalists of Big Brother Brasil 1.

(ages stated at time of contest)

| Name | Age | Occupation | Hometown | Day entered | Day exited | Result |
|---|---|---|---|---|---|---|
| Kleber de Paula | 24 | Dancer | Campinas | 1 | 64 | Winner |
| Vanessa Pascale | 28 | Model | Rio de Janeiro | 1 | 64 | Runner-up |
| André Gabeh | 28 | Singing teacher | Rio de Janeiro | 1 | 64 | Third place |
| Sergio Tavares | 30 | Hairdresser | Angola | 1 | 62 | 9th Evicted |
| Alessandra Begliomini | 27 | Businesswoman | São Paulo | 1 | 57 | 8th Evicted |
| Estela Padilha | 24 | Videographer | São Paulo | 1 | 50 | 7th Evicted |
| Adriano de Castro | 34 | Artist | Salvador | 1 | 43 | 6th Evicted |
| Helena Louro | 25 | Actress | Maringá | 1 | 36 | 5th Evicted |
| Cristiana Mota | 28 | Singer | Rio de Janeiro | 1 | 29 | 4th Evicted |
| Bruno Saladini | 25 | Model | Rio de Janeiro | 1 | 22 | 3rd Evicted |
| Xaiane Dantas | 28 | Barwoman | Rio de Janeiro | 1 | 15 | 2nd Evicted |
| Caetano Zonaro | 40 | Model | São Paulo | 1 | 8 | 1st Evicted |

== Future appearances ==
| Housemate | Year | Future Appearance | Placements |
|---|---|---|---|
| Kleber Bambam | 2013 | Big Brother Brasil 13 | 17th place Walked |

In 2025, Kleber Bambam, appeared at the BBB: The Documentary as one of the interviewed housemates.

== Voting history ==
| | Week 1 | Week 2 | Week 3 | Week 4 | Week 5 | Week 6 | Week 7 | Week 8 | Week 9 | |
| | Week 1 | Week 2 | Week 3 | Week 4 | Week 5 | Week 6 | Week 7 | Week 8 | Day 61 | Finale |
|---|---|---|---|---|---|---|---|---|---|---|
| Head of Household | Sergio | Adriano | Cristiana | Alessandra | Kleber | André | Vanessa | Sergio | André | (none) |
| Nomination (HoH) | Caetano | Helena | Bruno | Cristiana | Helena | Adriano | Estela | Alessandra | Sergio | (none) |
| Nomination (Housemates) | Helena | Xaiane | Kleber | Estela | Alessandra | Vanessa | Kleber | Kleber | Kleber | (none) |
| Kleber | Helena | Alessandra | Helena | Estela | Head of Household | Vanessa | André | André | Not eligible | Winner (Day 64) |
| Vanessa | Alessandra | Cristiana | Kleber | Estela | Alessandra | Kleber | Head of Household | Kleber | Not eligible | Runner-up (Day 64) |
| André | Bruno | Kleber | Kleber | Kleber | Adriano | Head of Household | Kleber | Kleber | Head of Household | Third place (Day 64) |
| Sergio | Head of Household | Xaiane | Kleber | Estela | Alessandra | Kleber | Kleber | Head of Household | Kleber | Evicted (Day 62) |
| Alessandra | Helena | Xaiane | Kleber | Estela | Adriano | Vanessa | Kleber | Kleber | Evicted (Day 57) | |
| Estela | Helena | Bruno | Kleber | Kleber | Alessandra | Vanessa | Kleber | Evicted (Day 50) | | |
| Adriano | Helena | Head of Household | Kleber | Kleber | Alessandra | Vanessa | Evicted (Day 43) | | | |
| Helena | Alessandra | Xaiane | Kleber | Kleber | Adriano | Evicted (Day 36) | | | | |
| Cristiana | Bruno | Xaiane | Head of Household | Estela | Evicted (Day 29) | | | | | |
| Bruno | Helena | Xaiane | Helena | Evicted; Day 22) | | | | | | |
| Xaiane | Bruno | Alessandra | Evicted (Day 15) | | | | | | | |
| Caetano | Helena | Evicted (Day 8) | | | | | | | | |
| Notes | (none) | | | 1, 2 | (none) | 3 | (none) | | 4 | 5 |
| Nominated for eviction | Caetano; Helena | Helena; Xaiane | Bruno; Kleber | Cristiana; Estela | Alessandra; Helena | Adriano; Vanessa | Estela; Kleber | Alessandra; Kleber | Kleber; Sergio | André; Kleber; Vanessa |
| Evicted | Caetano; 55% to evict | Xaiane; 77% to evict | Bruno; 53% to evict | Cristiana; 70% to evict | Helena; 51% to evict | Adriano; 74% to evict | Estela; 85% to evict | Alessandra; 73% to evict | Sergio; 52% to evict | André; 11% to win |
| Evicted | Caetano; 55% to evict | Xaiane; 77% to evict | Bruno; 53% to evict | Cristiana; 70% to evict | Helena; 51% to evict | Adriano; 74% to evict | Estela; 85% to evict | Alessandra; 73% to evict | Sergio; 52% to evict | Vanessa; 21% to win |
| Evicted | Caetano; 55% to evict | Xaiane; 77% to evict | Bruno; 53% to evict | Cristiana; 70% to evict | Helena; 51% to evict | Adriano; 74% to evict | Estela; 85% to evict | Alessandra; 73% to evict | Sergio; 52% to evict | Kleber; 68% to win |

=== Notes ===
- ^Note 1: Estela and Kleber received the most nominations with 4 each. Alessandra, the Head of Household, had the casting vote and chose Estela to be the second nominee.
- ^Note 2: Adriano won immunity on week four, and he won it the day of house vote, so he was immune only for the house vote but not for the HoH vote.
- ^Note 3: Estela won immunity on week 6, but she won it before the HoH vote, so she was immune to all the nominations.
- ^Note 4: Already nominated by the Head of Household, Sergio was the only person to vote, since André had immunity and Kleber and Vanessa's votes would cancel each other out.
- ^Note 5: For the finale, the public voted for the finalist they want to win Big Brother Brasil.
