= São Domingos, Bahia =

São Domingos
- Municipality
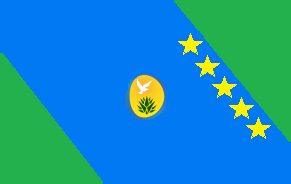
- Flag Coat of arms

- Location in Brazil
- Coordinates: 11°30′10″S 39°32′31″W
- Country: Brazil
- Region: Nordeste
- State: Bahia

Population (2020)
  - Total: 9,072
- Time zone: UTC−3 (BRT)

São Domingos is a municipality in the state of Bahia in the North-East region of Brazil.

== See also ==
- List of municipalities in Bahia
