= Vampeta =

Brazilian footballer (born 1974)

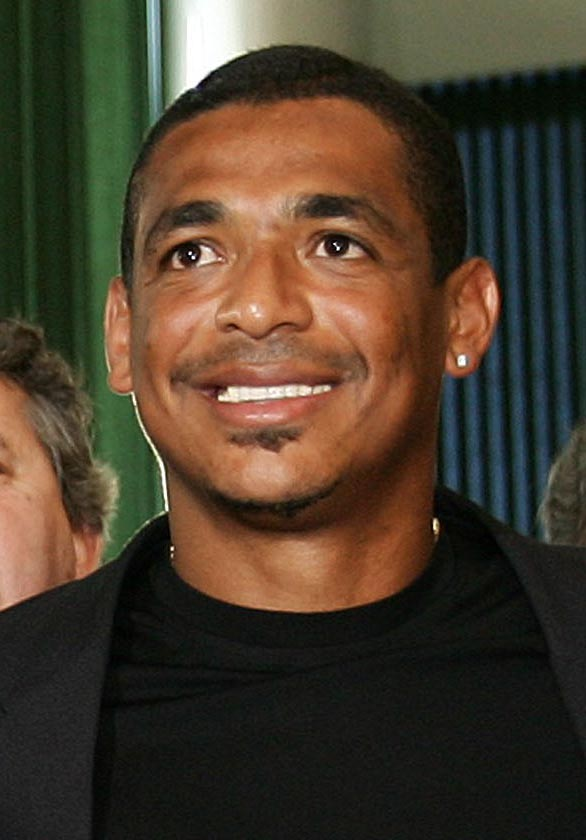
- Vampeta in 2005

Personal information
- Full name: Marcos André Batista dos Santos
- Date of birth: 13 March 1974 (age 52)
- Place of birth: Nazaré, Bahia, Brazil
- Height: 1.82 m (6 ft 0 in)
- Position: Midfielder

Team information
- Current team: Grêmio Osasco (manager)

Youth career
- 1990–1993: Vitória

Senior career*
Years	Team	Apps	(Gls)
1993–1994	Vitória	8	(0)
1994–1998	PSV Eindhoven	34	(2)
1995	→ VVV (loan)	7	(3)
1995–1996	→ Fluminense (loan)	23	(2)
1998–2000	Corinthians	53	(4)
2000	Inter Milan	8	(1)
2001	Paris Saint-Germain	7	(0)
2001	Flamengo	16	(1)
2002–2003	Corinthians	29	(0)
2004	Vitória	6	(0)
2004–2005	Kuwait SC	0	(0)
2005	Brasiliense	37	(0)
2006	Goiás	1	(0)
2007	Corinthians	19	(0)
2008	Juventus da Mooca		
Total		241	(12)

International career
1998–2002	Brazil	39	(2)

Managerial career
- 2010: Nacional
- 2011: Grêmio Osasco
Medal record
Men's Football
Representing Brazil
FIFA World Cup
Winner	2002 Korea/Japan
- * Club domestic league appearances and goals

Marcos André Batista dos Santos, best known as Vampeta (Portuguese pronunciation: [vɐ̃ˈpetɐ]; born 13 March 1974) is a Brazilian football pundit and retired footballer. A former midfielder, he represented Brazil national team from 1998 until 2002, winning the 1999 Copa América and the 2002 FIFA World Cup.

Vampeta, his nickname, is a fusion of the words "vampiro" (Portuguese for vampire) and "capeta" (Portuguese slang for devil), because his childhood friends thought he was ugly and toothless.

== Playing career ==
=== Club ===
Vampeta started his career in Salvador, with team Vitória, and later went to Europe with Dutch team PSV Eindhoven, who signed him alongside Ronaldo in the summer of 1994. After a difficult first season, PSV released him on loan to Fluminense, before he returned to the Netherlands as regular of the team that won the first Dutch title in five years in 1997.

His good performance in Eindhoven led him back to Brazil, where at Corinthians he went on to become a member of the Brazil national team. Vampeta then joined Internazionale in the summer of 2000, being reunited with Ronaldo. He scored in the 2000 Supercoppa Italiana, but failed to hold down a first-team place however, he stated that he wanted to leave and went to Rio de Janeiro in December for a vacation. In January 2001, Vampeta went to PSG for €12.2 million as part exchange for Stéphane Dalmat, which Inter retained 50% registration rights on Vampeta .

He was involved in the Adriano (€13.2 million to Inter) and Reinaldo (to PSG) transfer in August 2001, who both played in Flamengo, in exchange for Vampeta who was joint-owned by Inter and PSG. Another half of Vampeta was sold for €9.8 million,

In 2007, he returned to Corinthians, signed a contract until the end of season.

After being released by Corinthians, he signed a contract until mid-2008 with Juventus da Mooca for 2008 Campeonato Paulista.

=== International ===
Vampeta made his international debut for Brazil in a friendly match against FR Yugoslavia on 23 September 1998. He then became a regular player for Brazil, being called up for the 1999 Copa América, 1999 FIFA Confederations Cup and 2001 FIFA Confederations Cup. He was also on Brazil's World Cup winning team in 2002, although he only made one substitute appearance during the competition. In total, he made 39 appearances for Brazil between 1998 and 2002, scoring two goals.

== Coaching career ==
In February 2010, Vampeta was named as the new head coach of Nacional.

== Career statistics ==
=== International goals ===
Score and result list Brazil's goal tally first, score column indicates score after Vampeta goal.

International goal scored by Vampeta
No.	Date	Venue	Opponent	Score	Result	Competition
1	26 July 2000	São Paulo, Brazil	Argentina	2–0	3–1	2002 FIFA World Cup Qual.
2	26 July 2000	São Paulo, Brazil	Argentina	3–1	3–1	2002 FIFA World Cup Qual.

== Honours ==
PSV Eindhoven

- Johan Cruijff-schaal: 1996, 1997
- Eredivisie: 1997

Corinthians

- Campeonato Brasileiro Série A, 1998, 1999
- Campeonato Paulista: 1999, 2003
- FIFA Club World Championship: 2000
- Torneio Rio-São Paulo: 2002
- Copa do Brasil: 2002

Goiás

- Goiás State League: 2006

Brazil

- FIFA World Cup: 2002
- Copa América: 1999

Individual

- Bola de Prata (Placar): 1998, 1999
- South American Team of The Year: 1999

== See also ==
- Vampetaço
