= List of Hot 100 number-one singles of 2025 (Brazil) =

The Brasil Hot 100 is a record chart that ranks the best-performing songs in Brazil. Its data is compiled by Luminate and published by music magazines Billboard Brasil and Billboard. The chart is based on each song's weekly audio and video streams on online digital music platforms.

== Chart history ==
No.	Issue date (Note: The issue date is not from Billboard Brasil, but from the American Billboard.)	Song	Artist(s)	Ref.
28	4 January	"Última Noite"	Léo Foguete	
28	11 January	"Última Noite"	Léo Foguete	
29	18 January	"Oh Garota Eu Quero Você Só Pra Mim"	Oruam, Zé Felipe and MC Tuto featuring DJ LC da Roca, MC K9, MC Rodrigo do CN and MC Pl Alves	
29	25 January	"Oh Garota Eu Quero Você Só Pra Mim"	Oruam, Zé Felipe and MC Tuto featuring DJ LC da Roca, MC K9, MC Rodrigo do CN and MC Pl Alves	
re	1 February	"Última Noite"	Léo Foguete	
re	8 February	"Última Noite"	Léo Foguete	
re	15 February	"Oh Garota Eu Quero Você Só Pra Mim"	Oruam, Zé Felipe and MC Tuto featuring DJ LC da Roca, MC K9, MC Rodrigo do CN and MC Pl Alves	
re	22 February	"Oh Garota Eu Quero Você Só Pra Mim"	Oruam, Zé Felipe and MC Tuto featuring DJ LC da Roca, MC K9, MC Rodrigo do CN and MC Pl Alves	
re	1 March	"Oh Garota Eu Quero Você Só Pra Mim"	Oruam, Zé Felipe and MC Tuto featuring DJ LC da Roca, MC K9, MC Rodrigo do CN and MC Pl Alves	
re	8 March	"Oh Garota Eu Quero Você Só Pra Mim"	Oruam, Zé Felipe and MC Tuto featuring DJ LC da Roca, MC K9, MC Rodrigo do CN and MC Pl Alves	
30	15 March	"Resenha do Arrocha"	J. Eskine	
31	22 March	"Mãe Solteira"	DG e Batidão Stronda, MC Davi, J. Eskine and MC G15	
31	29 March	"Mãe Solteira"	DG e Batidão Stronda, MC Davi, J. Eskine and MC G15	
31	5 April	"Mãe Solteira"	DG e Batidão Stronda, MC Davi, J. Eskine and MC G15	
31	12 April	"Mãe Solteira"	DG e Batidão Stronda, MC Davi, J. Eskine and MC G15	
32	19 April	"Tubarões"	Diego & Victor Hugo	
32	26 April	"Tubarões"	Diego & Victor Hugo	
32	3 May	"Tubarões"	Diego & Victor Hugo	
32	10 May	"Tubarões"	Diego & Victor Hugo	
32	17 May	"Tubarões"	Diego & Victor Hugo	
32	24 May	"Tubarões"	Diego & Victor Hugo	
33	31 May	"P do Pecado"	Menos é Mais and Simone Mendes	
33	7 June	"P do Pecado"	Menos é Mais and Simone Mendes	
re	14 June	"Tubarões"	Diego & Victor Hugo	
re	21 June	"Tubarões"	Diego & Victor Hugo	
re	28 June	"Tubarões"	Diego & Victor Hugo	
re	5 July	"P do Pecado"	Menos é Mais and Simone Mendes	
re	12 July	"P do Pecado"	Menos é Mais and Simone Mendes	
re	19 July	"P do Pecado"	Menos é Mais and Simone Mendes	
re	26 July	"P do Pecado"	Menos é Mais and Simone Mendes	
re	2 August	"P do Pecado"	Menos é Mais and Simone Mendes	
re	9 August	"P do Pecado"	Menos é Mais and Simone Mendes	
re	16 August	"P do Pecado"	Menos é Mais and Simone Mendes	
re	23 August	"P do Pecado"	Menos é Mais and Simone Mendes	
re	30 August	"P do Pecado"	Menos é Mais and Simone Mendes	
re	6 September	"P do Pecado"	Menos é Mais and Simone Mendes	
re	13 September	"P do Pecado"	Menos é Mais and Simone Mendes	
re	20 September	"P do Pecado"	Menos é Mais and Simone Mendes	
re	27 September	"P do Pecado"	Menos é Mais and Simone Mendes	
re	4 October	"P do Pecado"	Menos é Mais and Simone Mendes	
re	11 October	"P do Pecado"	Menos é Mais and Simone Mendes	
re	18 October	"P do Pecado"	Menos é Mais and Simone Mendes	
re	25 October	"P do Pecado"	Menos é Mais and Simone Mendes	
34	1 November	"Posso Até Não Te Dar Flores"	DJ Japa NK, MC Jacaré, MC Meno K, MC Ryan SP and DJ Davi DogDog	
34	8 November	"Posso Até Não Te Dar Flores"	DJ Japa NK, MC Jacaré, MC Meno K, MC Ryan SP and DJ Davi DogDog	
34	15 November	"Posso Até Não Te Dar Flores"	DJ Japa NK, MC Jacaré, MC Meno K, MC Ryan SP and DJ Davi DogDog	
34	22 November	"Posso Até Não Te Dar Flores"	DJ Japa NK, MC Jacaré, MC Meno K, MC Ryan SP and DJ Davi DogDog	
34	29 November	"Posso Até Não Te Dar Flores"	DJ Japa NK, MC Jacaré, MC Meno K, MC Ryan SP and DJ Davi DogDog	
34	6 December	"Posso Até Não Te Dar Flores"	DJ Japa NK, MC Jacaré, MC Meno K, MC Ryan SP and DJ Davi DogDog	
34	13 December	"Posso Até Não Te Dar Flores"	DJ Japa NK, MC Jacaré, MC Meno K, MC Ryan SP and DJ Davi DogDog	
34	20 December	"Posso Até Não Te Dar Flores"	DJ Japa NK, MC Jacaré, MC Meno K, MC Ryan SP and DJ Davi DogDog	
34	27 December	"Posso Até Não Te Dar Flores"	DJ Japa NK, MC Jacaré, MC Meno K, MC Ryan SP and DJ Davi DogDog	

== Number-one artists ==
List of number-one artists by total weeks at number one
Artist	Weeks at No. 1
Menos é Mais	19
Simone Mendes	19
Diego & Victor Hugo	9
DJ Japa NK	9
MC Jacaré	9
MC Meno K	9
MC Ryan SP	9
DJ Davi DogDog	9
Oruam	6
Zé Felipe	6
MC Tuto	6
DJ LC da Roca	6
MC K9	6
MC Rodrigo do CN	6
MC Pl Alves	6
J. Eskine	5
Léo Foguete	4
DG e Batidão Stronda	4
MC Davi	4
MC G15	4
