= Multishow Brazilian Music Award for Arrocha of the Year =

Brazilian music for arrocha songs

- Awarded for: Arrocha songs
- Country: Brazil
- Presented by: Multishow
- First award: 2024
- Most recent winner: "Resenha do Arrocha" – J. Eskine and Alef Donk (2025)

Highlights
- Most nominations: Grelo and Natanzinho Lima (2 each)
- Website: Official website

The Multishow Brazilian Music Award for Arrocha of the Year is an award presented at the Multishow Brazilian Music Awards, to artists for arrocha genre songs. The genre was first recognized at the 2023 Multishow Brazilian Music Awards with the introduction of the Brega/Arrocha of the Year category, which also recognized brega music. The following year, the category was discontinued and split into two: Brega of the Year and Arrocha of the Year.

The Arrocha of the Year award was first presented to Grelo for the song "Só Fé" in 2024. Grelo and Natanzinho Lima holds the record for most nominations, with two each.

== Recipients ==
=== 2020s ===
Recipients
| Year | Winner(s) | Nominees | Ref. |
|---|---|---|---|
| 2024 | Grelo – "Só Fé" | Natanzinho Lima – "5 da Manhã"; Heitor Costa – "Arrasada"; Grelo – "De Graça ou Pagando"; Natanzinho Lima – "Mentira Estampada na Cara"; Nadson o Ferinha – "Oração" | |
| 2025 | J. Eskine and Alef Donk – "Resenha do Arrocha" | DG e Batidão Stronda, MC Davi, J. Eskine and MC G15 – "Mãe Solteira"; Luan Pereira, Grelo and MC Tuto – "Não Era Love"; Natanzinho Lima, MC Tato and Gabb MC – "Me Apaixonei Nessa Morena"; Theuzinho and Nadson o Ferinha – "Vou Começar a Não Prestar"; Unha Pintada – "Saudade Top 1" | |

== Artists with multiple nominations ==
2 nominations

- Grelo
- Natanzinho Lima

== See also ==
- Multishow Brazilian Music Award for Brega/Arrocha of the Year
- Multishow Brazilian Music Award for Brega of the Year
