= Multishow Brazilian Music Award for Brega of the Year =

Brazilian music award for brega songs

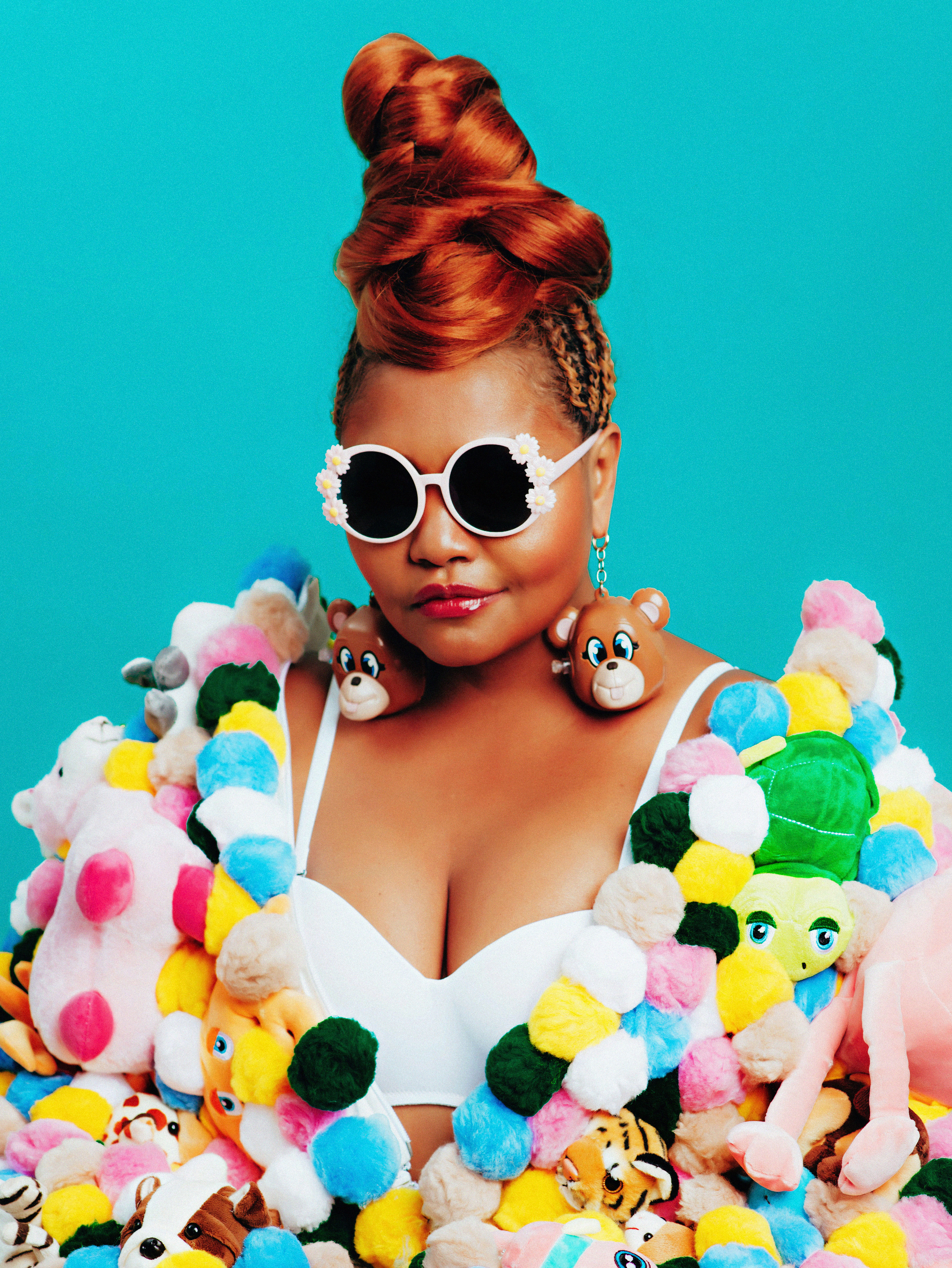
- Gaby Amarantos is the most recent recipient
- Awarded for: Brega songs
- Country: Brazil
- Presented by: Multishow
- First award: 2024
- Most recent winner: "Foguinho" – Gaby Amarantos (2025)

Highlights
- Most nominations: Gaby Amarantos and Pabllo Vittar (2 each)
- Website: Official website

The Multishow Brazilian Music Award for Brega of the Year is an award presented at the Multishow Brazilian Music Awards, to artists for brega genre songs. The genre was first recognized at the 2023 Multishow Brazilian Music Awards with the introduction of the Brega/Arrocha of the Year category, which also recognized arrocha. The following year, the category was discontinued and split into two: Brega of the Year and Arrocha of the Year.

The Brega of the Year award was first presented to Manu Bahtidão and Simone Mendes for the song "Daqui pra Sempre" in 2024. Gaby Amarantos and Pabllo Vittar holds the record for most nominations, with two each.

== Recipients ==
=== 2020s ===
Recipients
Year	Winner(s)	Nominees	Ref.
2024	Manu Bahtidão and Simone Mendes – "Daqui pra Sempre"	Gaby Amarantos (featuring Banda Uó) – "Me Libera"; Gaby Amarantos and Pabllo Vittar – "Não Vou Te Deixar"; Raidol and Viviane Batidão – "Outra Vez"; Zaynara (featuring Pabllo Vittar) – "Quem Manda em Mim"; AQNO – "Sobrou pra Você"	
2025	Gaby Amarantos – "Foguinho"	Luan Pereira, Zé Felipe and MC Tuto – "Apostar em Você"; Zé Felipe and Grelo – "Bailão"; Grelo – "Desabafo de Um Jovem Adulto"; Raphaela Santos and Wesley Safadão – "Pense o Que Quiser de Mim"; Natanzinho Lima – "Sonho de Amor"	

== Artists with multiple nominations ==
2 nominations

- Gaby Amarantos
- Pabllo Vittar

== See also ==
- Multishow Brazilian Music Award for Brega/Arrocha of the Year
- Multishow Brazilian Music Award for Arrocha of the Year
