= List of Hot 100 number-one singles of 2026 (Brazil) =

The Brasil Hot 100 is a record chart that ranks the best-performing songs in Brazil. Its data is compiled by Luminate and published by music magazines Billboard Brasil and Billboard. The chart is based on each song's weekly audio and video streams on online digital music platforms.

== Chart history ==
No.	Issue date (Note: The issue date is not from Billboard Brasil, but from the American Billboard.)	Song	Artist(s)	Ref.
34	3 January	"Posso Até Não Te Dar Flores"	DJ Japa NK, MC Jacaré, MC Meno K, MC Ryan SP and DJ Davi DogDog	
34	10 January	"Posso Até Não Te Dar Flores"	DJ Japa NK, MC Jacaré, MC Meno K, MC Ryan SP and DJ Davi DogDog	
34	17 January	"Posso Até Não Te Dar Flores"	DJ Japa NK, MC Jacaré, MC Meno K, MC Ryan SP and DJ Davi DogDog	
34	24 January	"Posso Até Não Te Dar Flores"	DJ Japa NK, MC Jacaré, MC Meno K, MC Ryan SP and DJ Davi DogDog	
34	31 January	"Posso Até Não Te Dar Flores"	DJ Japa NK, MC Jacaré, MC Meno K, MC Ryan SP and DJ Davi DogDog	
34	7 February	"Posso Até Não Te Dar Flores"	DJ Japa NK, MC Jacaré, MC Meno K, MC Ryan SP and DJ Davi DogDog	
34	14 February	"Posso Até Não Te Dar Flores"	DJ Japa NK, MC Jacaré, MC Meno K, MC Ryan SP and DJ Davi DogDog	
34	21 February	"Posso Até Não Te Dar Flores"	DJ Japa NK, MC Jacaré, MC Meno K, MC Ryan SP and DJ Davi DogDog	
35	28 February	"Jetski"	Pedro Sampaio, MC Meno K and Melody	
35	7 March	"Jetski"	Pedro Sampaio, MC Meno K and Melody	
re	14 March	"Posso Até Não Te Dar Flores"	DJ Japa NK, MC Jacaré, MC Meno K, MC Ryan SP and DJ Davi DogDog	
re	21 March	"Jetski"	Pedro Sampaio, MC Meno K and Melody	
36	28 March	"Eu Te Seguro"	Panda	
37	4 April	"Swim"	BTS	
37	11 April	"Swim"	BTS	
37	18 April	"Swim"	BTS	
38	25 April	"Reliquia do 2T"	MC Tuto, MC Vine7, MC Joãozinho VT, MC Dkziin, DJ Gu and MC Fr da Norte	
38	2 May	"Reliquia do 2T"	MC Tuto, MC Vine7, MC Joãozinho VT, MC Dkziin, DJ Gu and MC Fr da Norte	

== Number-one artists ==
List of number-one artists by total weeks at number one
Artist	Weeks at No. 1
MC Meno K	12
DJ Japa NK	9
MC Jacaré	9
MC Ryan SP	9
DJ Davi DogDog	9
Pedro Sampaio	3
Melody	3
BTS	3
MC Tuto	2
MC Vine7	2
MC Joãozinho VT	2
MC Dkziin	2
DJ Gu	2
MC Fr da Norte	2
Panda	1
