= Halo (Beyoncé song) =

2009 single by Beyoncé

Single by Beyoncé

from the album I Am... Sasha Fierce
- B-side: "Diva"
- Released: January 20, 2009
- Recorded: 2008
- Studio: Manfield (Los Angeles); Germano; Roc the Mic (New York City)
- Genre: Pop; R&B
- Length: 4:21 (album version); 3:44 (radio edit)
- Label: Columbia
- Songwriters: Ryan Tedder; Evan Bogart; Beyoncé Knowles
- Producers: Ryan Tedder; Beyoncé Knowles

Beyoncé singles chronology
"At Last" (2008)	"Diva" / "Halo" (2009)	"Ego" (2009)

Music video
- "Halo" on YouTube

"Halo" is a song recorded by American singer Beyoncé for her third studio album, I Am... Sasha Fierce (2008). Included on the I Am... disc, it was intended to give a behind-the-scenes glimpse of Beyoncé's life, stripped of her make-up and celebrity trappings. Columbia Records released the song, the album's fourth single, to mainstream radio in the United States on January 20, 2009, and to international markets from February 20. Inspired by Ray LaMontagne's 2004 song "Shelter", "Halo" was written by Ryan Tedder and Evan Bogart, with the former producing it alongside Beyoncé, who handled the vocal production. It was originally conceived by Tedder and Bogart specifically for Beyoncé, although there was media speculation that it had been intended for Leona Lewis.

"Halo" is a pop and R&B power ballad, whose lyrics describe a sublime love. It features drum, piano, keyboard, string, synthesizer, and percussion instrumentation. The song faced a controversy when Kelly Clarkson claimed that Tedder had reused the musical arrangement in her own 2009 song "Already Gone". "Halo" received acclaim from music critics, who made comparisons with Lewis's 2007 song "Bleeding Love", also written by Tedder. Its production and Beyoncé's vocals also received critical praise. "Halo" was nominated for Record of the Year and won Best Female Pop Vocal Performance at the 52nd Annual Grammy Awards. It won Best Song at the 2009 MTV Europe Music Awards.

"Halo" topped the singles charts of Brazil, Portugal, Norway, and Slovakia, and reached the top five on the singles chart of Australia, Germany, Ireland, Italy, New Zealand, Switzerland, the United Kingdom, and the United States. It was the most-played song of the 2000s decade on Brazilian radio, despite being released in 2009. The song has received numerous certifications, including a thirteen-times platinum certification from Australia, making it one of the highest-certified songs in the country, an elevenfold-platinum certification from the US, a ninefold-platinum certification from Canada, a quintuple-platinum certification from the United Kingdom, a triple-platinum certification from Italy, a triple-gold certification from Germany and a double-platinum award from Spain and Denmark.

Philip Andelman directed the accompanying music video, which features American actor Michael Ealy. It portrays a romantic relationship between characters played by Beyoncé and Ealy. Critics complimented Beyoncé's looks in the clip, and it became her first YouTube video to surpass one billion views. An alternative music video, which shows Ealy's character being chased by police officers through a forest at night, was posted on the Internet in May 2010. The lyrics to "Halo" were changed for three of Beyoncé's special live performances: a tribute to Michael Jackson following his death, a tribute to the victims of the 2010 Haiti earthquake, and for Kobe and Gianna Bryant's memorial in 2020. The song has been covered by many artists, including Florence and the Machine, Harper Blynn, LP, and Westlife. It was also performed on the television show Glee, and was added to the soundtrack of the Brazilian telenovela Caminho das Índias.

== Writing and production ==
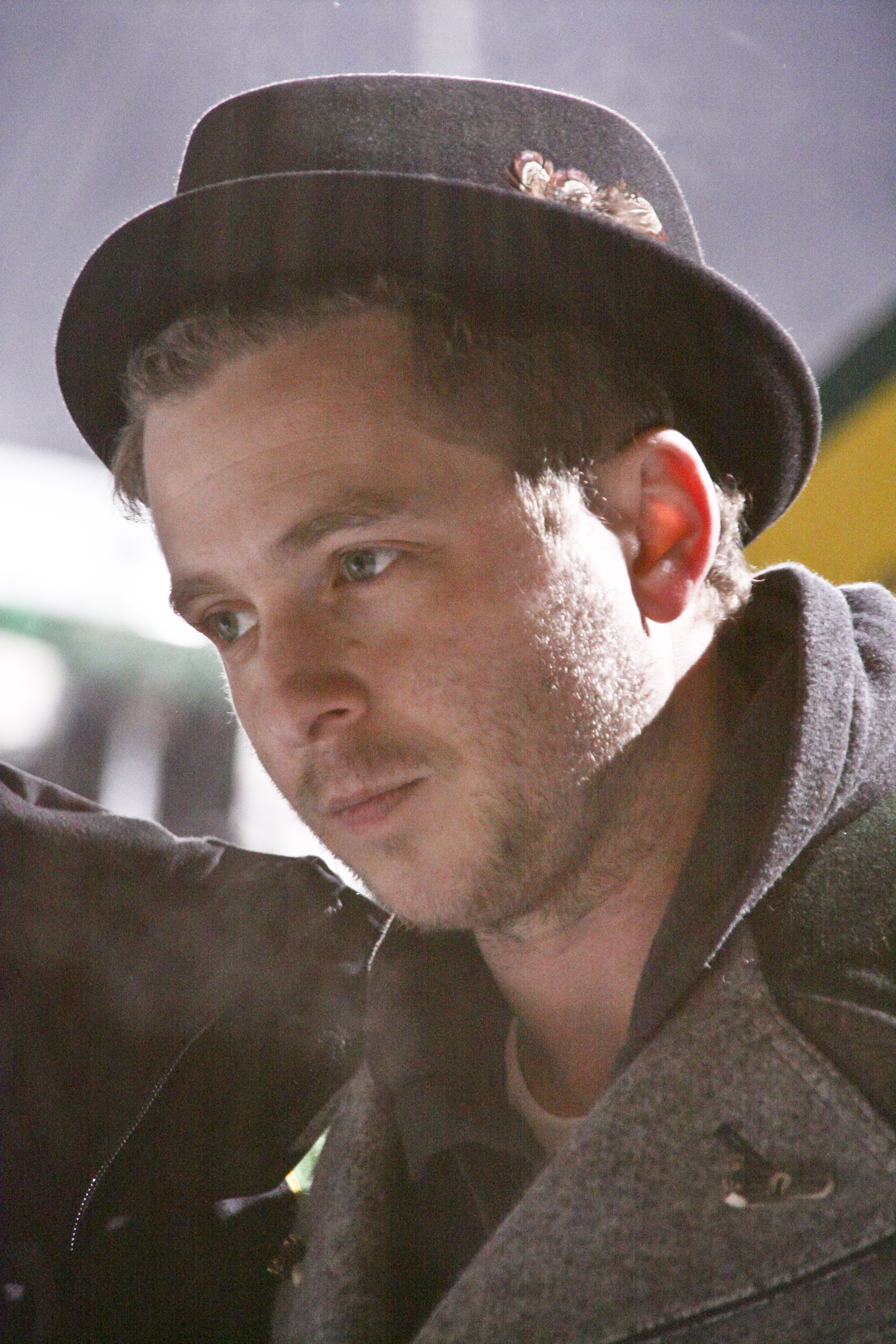
Beyoncé, Bogart, and Tedder (pictured) composed "Halo" in Tedder's music studio in California.

"Halo" was initially composed by Ryan Tedder, lead vocalist of OneRepublic, together with Evan "Kidd" Bogart. In an interview for HitQuarters, Kidd narrated the events that led to writing the song. OneRepublic canceled their tour after Tedder had torn his Achilles tendon and had undergone surgery. The following day, the band sent Tedder to Los Angeles. There, he and Kidd were socializing when Tedder expressed his desire to write a song. Initially, Kidd opposed the idea because Tedder was supposed to be recuperating, but the pair went to Tedder's studio. During the writing sessions, singer Ray LaMontagne was the primary inspiration for "Halo". Kidd suggested they create a song in the style of LaMontagne's "Shelter" for Beyoncé and her husband Jay-Z, and proposed the title "Halo" after hearing Tedder play "angelic" chords. They wrote the song in three hours. In 2009, the original demo leaked on the Internet, and its production was similar to the published recording, for which Beyoncé received a writing credit. Tedder explained that she vocally edited the song's bridge and consequently earned the credit.

According to Simon Cowell, owner of the music production company Syco Entertainment, Bogart and Tedder intended "Halo" for his client, singer Leona Lewis, who was unable to record it due to scheduling conflicts. Cowell was upset that Beyoncé chose to record the song. David Balls, editor of the British media website Digital Spy, asked Tedder during an interview whether "Halo" had initially been written for Lewis. Tedder answered that he had only tentatively offered the track to Lewis because Beyoncé delayed recording it. He commented:

There was this huge scandal that originally "Halo" was meant to go to Leona. That was never the case ... That song was written for Beyoncé. What happened was that Beyoncé waited long enough to record that song ... I thought this would be a brilliant first single for Leona, which it would have ... What I did was foolishly say to Leona's camp, "I have it on hold for another A-list artist and I'm pretty sure they'll take it, but if they don't, I just want to know if you like it enough to consider it". I sent it to them and they flipped on it. They loved it and instantly said they wanted to do it. I was like, "Wait, wait, wait, no, it's not free yet!"

Tedder and Beyoncé produced "Halo" in 2008 at Los Angeles' Manfield Studios, and at New York City's Germano and Roc The Mic Studios. During the production, Beyoncé edited and composed a new bridge for the song. Tedder did the musical arrangements and played the instruments, while Christian Baker assisted in recording the music. Mark "Spike" Stent mixed the track with assistance from Matt Green, and Jim Caruana recorded Beyoncé's vocals; both tasks were done at Roc the Mic Studios. "Halo" is present on the I Am... disc of the double album I Am... Sasha Fierce, as it is a ballad that shows Beyoncé's insecurities about love, and the person she is "underneath all the makeup, underneath the lights and underneath all the exciting star drama". Beyoncé has said that she loves singing ballads because, "the music and the emotion in the story is told [sic] so much better. It's a better connection because you can hear it and it's not all these other distractions. I really wanted people to hear my voice and hear what I had to say".

== Composition and lyrical interpretation ==
"Halo"
A 26-second sample of the third and final pre-chorus and chorus of "Halo", which include R&B undertones, sweeping strings, and percussive step sounds. Towards the end, Beyoncé echoes, "Ha-lo, ha-lo, ha-lo", which is similar to the way Rihanna ricochets, "eh eh eh", on the chorus of "Umbrella".

"Halo" is a contemporary downtempo R&B power ballad that features a pop production. It has elements of gospel and soul music. Instrumentation is provided by a piano, a keyboard, big drums, a synthesizer, strings, and percussion instruments. The cascading piano work is accompanied by percussive beats that alternate between handclaps and foot stomps. "Halo" was composed using common time in the key of A major, with a tempo of 84 beats per minute. It is built on the chord progression A–Bm–F♯m–D, and is written in the common verse–chorus form. Beyoncé's vocals span from C♯_{3} to the head voice note of G_{5}, incorporate melisma, and are supported by backing vocals. She ornaments her singing with vibrato yelps and trills—rapid alternations between two adjacent notes, usually a semitone or tone apart. The arrangement also consists of symphonic crescendos and electronic accents.

In "Halo", Beyoncé professes her all-encompassing fondness to her lover with open-hearted emotion. She said, "['Halo'] is angelic ... like you see [angels'] faces instantly when you hear it. [Its lyrics] are basically saying that I had these walls built up about love; you completely tore them down and when I look at you I see your halo, it's really beautiful". Backed by a piano, claps and step stomps that set a spiritualized atmosphere, Beyoncé opens the song with the lines: "Remember those walls I built? / Well, baby, they're tumbling down". She sings the introduction in a low register, and the power of her voice gradually increases as the song progresses. In the pre-chorus, she chants, "Everywhere I'm looking now, I'm surrounded by your embrace / baby I can see your halo, you know you're my saving grace / you're everything I need and more, it's written all over your face". Beyoncé then echoes the word "halo" in the chorus; the third and final one is preceded by a 1980s drum breakdown, and is complemented by sweeping strings and percussion.

== Release ==
"Halo" and "Ego" were initially planned for simultaneous release in the US, following the 2008 dual lead singles "If I Were a Boy" and "Single Ladies (Put a Ring on It)". The release of "Ego" was canceled and replaced with "Diva". "Halo" was placed on a different disc of I Am... Sasha Fierce to "Diva"; the intention was to demonstrate the concept that Beyoncé has conflicting personalities—the central theme of the album. The motif was demonstrated by placing the album's ballads and uptempo tracks on separate discs. "Halo" was sent by Music World Entertainment and Columbia Records to contemporary hit radio playlists on January 20, 2009, while "Diva" was targeted to rhythmic contemporary and urban contemporary radio playlists. A digital extended play (EP) containing a radio edit and four remixes of "Halo" was later released on April 14, 2009.

On February 20, 2009, "Halo" was released as a two-track digital download, including a remix of "Single Ladies (Put a Ring on It)" in Australia and New Zealand. On March 20, 2009, "Halo" was serviced digitally alongside the album version of "Diva" in mainland Europe, including Germany, where it was also made available as a CD single on April 3 and a vinyl single on April 12, 2009. In the United Kingdom, a digital EP containing the album version and three remixes of "Halo" was released on April 13, 2009. The following day, the song was made available on a digital EP, as a maxi single and a vinyl single in Canada.

=== Controversy ===
Soon after composing "Halo", Tedder worked with Kelly Clarkson on her fourth studio album, All I Ever Wanted (2009), for which they wrote "Already Gone" together. When the song came out, critics noted a resemblance to Beyoncé's "Halo". Clarkson, however, initially stated that she was unaware of any similarities between the two songs. She eventually realized their resemblance when she listened to both recordings closely; the similarities are most notable in the backing tracks, which in both cases feature a melancholy piano, loud drums, and handclaps. She then alleged Tedder used the same arrangement on both "Already Gone" and "Halo", and complained that people would, incorrectly, assume she was stealing it from Beyoncé. Clarkson tried to prevent "Already Gone" from being included on All I Ever Wanted, but it was impossible to make last-minute changes, as her album was already being printed when I Am... Sasha Fierce was released.

Clarkson was furious and confronted Tedder on the phone. In response, Tedder commented that he would never give two artists the same musical arrangement, and that her criticism was "hurtful and absurd". He asserted that the concept, melodies, and lyrics of "Already Gone" and "Halo" are completely different. Calling "Already Gone" one of the best songs he had ever composed, Tedder challenged people to "listen [to the two ballads] and form their own opinions". Clarkson also tried to stop her label, RCA, from releasing "Already Gone" as a single because she wanted to respect Beyoncé, but they went against her will and released it. She said, "It's one of those things I have no control over. I already made my album. At this point, the record company can do whatever they want with it." Clarkson later told James Montgomery of MTV News that it was unfortunate "Already Gone" and "Halo" sound so similar, but noted that the vocal melodies differ.

== Critical reception ==
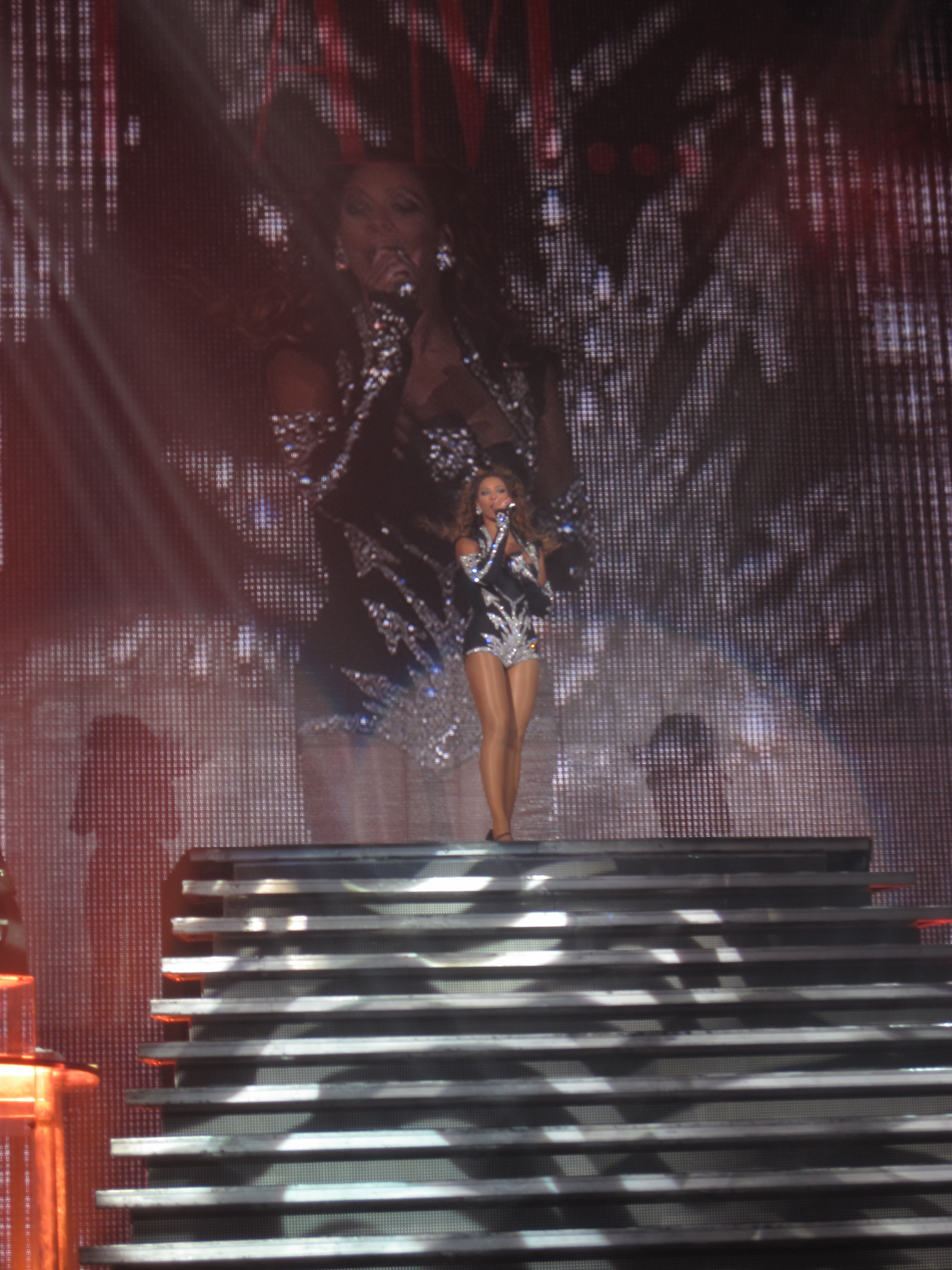
Beyoncé performing "Halo" during her I Am... World Tour at the O2 Arena, in London

"Halo" received universal acclaim. Christian Williams of Billboard magazine wrote that the pop sound of the song should take it to the top of the charts. He added that comparisons could be made to Lewis' "Bleeding Love" (2007), but concluded that "Halo" "hangs high on its own merits". Michael Slezak of Entertainment Weekly described "Halo" as "an absolutely glorious and perfectly produced track", which had the potential to be as commercially successful as "Crazy in Love" (2003) and "Irreplaceable" (2007).

Joey Guerra of the Houston Chronicle wrote that it was an immediate standout on I Am... Sasha Fierce. Praising the "big and wide" melodies of "Halo", Michaelangelo Matos of The A.V. Club commented that Beyoncé has "a real flair for grandeur". Jennifer Cady of E! Online wrote that the song could be included on a romantic mixtape, and James Montgomery of MTV News noted that the "tear-jerking power" of "Halo" reveals "sides of Beyoncé we never knew existed". Ryan Dombal of Pitchfork wrote that Beyoncé's vocal delivery was "strident and exposed", reminiscent of Céline Dion's style.

In spite of what he called its "garden-variety lyrics", James Reed of The Boston Globe wrote that "Halo" was "the most evocative power ballad" recorded by Beyoncé, comparing it to the work done by American record producer and songwriter Phil Spector on his Wall of Sound mixing board. Critics highlighted the similarities of "Halo" to Rihanna's "Umbrella" (2007); Alexis Petridis of The Guardian noted that both have the same "icy synths, drivetime rock dynamic, and a similar repetitive chorus". This view was echoed by Jennifer Vineyard of MTV News and Brent DiCrescenzo of Time Out, who viewed "Halo" as a "Bette Midler–level hymn from ['Umbrella'], lift[ing its] savior theme". Nick Levine of Digital Spy described "Halo" as a "muscular hybrid" of "Umbrella" and Lewis' "Bleeding Love". David Balls of the same website wrote, "'Halo' is a contemporary power ballad in the 'Bleeding Love' mould ... Could Lewis have pulled this off better? Well, that's a matter of opinion of course, but Mrs. Jay-Z doesn't leave much room for improvement."

=== Accolades ===
"Halo" was nominated for Best Single at the 2009 Urban Music Awards, and for Choice Love Song at the 2009 Teen Choice Awards. It won the Best Song award at the MTV Europe Music Awards 2009. The ballad was placed at number seven on Rap-Up's list of the 25 best songs of 2009. "Halo" was nominated at the 52nd Annual Grammy Awards in the categories of Record of the Year and Best Female Pop Vocal Performance, winning the latter. The live version of "Halo", featured on I Am... Yours: An Intimate Performance at Wynn Las Vegas (2009), was nominated for Best Female Pop Vocal Performance at the 53rd Annual Grammy Awards.

On The Village Voice's year-end Pazz & Jop singles list, "Halo" was ranked number 878 in 2008 and number 124 in 2009. The American Society of Composers, Authors and Publishers (ASCAP) recognized "Halo" as one of the most performed songs of 2009 at the 27th ASCAP Pop Music Awards. It also won Best Foreign Song at the 2010 Croatian Porin Awards.

On the occasion of Beyoncé's thirtieth birthday in 2011, Erika Ramirez and Jason Lipshutz of Billboard magazine placed the ballad at number 18 on their list of Beyoncé's 30 biggest Billboard hits. In 2013, John Boone and Jennifer Cady of E! Online placed the song at number three on their list of the ten best Beyoncé songs, writing that other power ballads "don't come more powerful than this one, which finds Beyoncé belting alongside what sounds to be every instrument in the entire world (including a dope one-second drum solo)". In 2017, Consequence of Sound named "Halo" the 23rd best song of 2009.

== Commercial performance ==
"Halo" debuted at number 93 on the US Billboard Hot 100 chart issue dated February 7, 2009. It peaked at number five on the chart issue dated May 23, 2009. The US success of "Halo" helped Beyoncé achieve more top 10 singles on the Hot 100 chart than any other female artist in the 2000s. After spending 30 weeks within the Hot 100's top 40, "Halo" last charted on the week ending August 29, 2009. It peaked at number two on the US Mainstream Top 40 chart, behind "Boom Boom Pow" by The Black Eyed Peas, at number one on the US Hot Dance Club Songs chart, and at number 16 on the US Hot R&B/Hip-Hop Songs chart. On January 5, 2010, the Recording Industry Association of America (RIAA) certified the single double-platinum, denoting sales of two million copies. In August 2022, RIAA updated Beyoncé's sales, certifying "Halo" as having sold more than 9 million copies. later updating the certification to eleven-times platinum in 2024.

"Halo" debuted at number 40 on the New Zealand Singles Chart on February 2, 2009, and attained a high point of number two three weeks later. The song remained 33 non-consecutive weeks on the chart, and was certified platinum by the Recording Industry Association of New Zealand (RIANZ), representing sales of 15,000 copies. In 2024, it was certified six-times platinum in 2024, for 180,000 equivalent units. On February 15, 2009, it entered the ARIA Singles Chart at number 29. The ballad peaked at number three for four non-consecutive weeks, and spent a total of 36 weeks in the top 50. The Australian Recording Industry Association (ARIA) certified "Halo" thirteen-times platinum for selling 910,000 copies.

"Halo" entered the UK Singles Chart at number 98 for the week ending February 21, 2009; over a period of seven weeks, it climbed to number four on March 29, 2009 (for the week ending April 4, 2009). It spent 49 weeks in the top 100 of UK Singles Chart; 44 non-consecutive weeks after its debut, it was at number 94 on March 4, 2012, before dropping out the following week. As of June 2022, it had sold 2.1 million copies in the UK, including 158.7 million plays, and is her best-selling and most streamed single there. The song was certified quintuple-platinum by the British Phonographic Industry (BPI), denoting 3,000,000 units sold and streamed in the UK. It debuted on the Irish Singles Chart at number 32 on January 22, 2009, and peaked at number four for three consecutive weeks.

On the Spanish Singles Chart, "Halo" debuted at number 45 on January 25, 2009, but it fell off the chart the following week. However, the song re-entered the chart four months later on May 3, 2009, at number 44, and peaked at number five on October 11, 2009. It was certified double-platinum by the Productores de Música de España (PROMUSICAE), indicating sales of 80,000 copies. "Halo" topped the Brasil Billboard Hot 100 chart for more than 20 consecutive weeks in 2009. It emerged as the most listened to song on radio in Brazil during the same period as it registered 24,734 plays on radio stations throughout the country. "Halo" was also the most downloaded song in Brazil from November 2009 to November 2010, as highlighted by the first edition of the Brazilian Digital Music Awards.

== Music videos ==
The accompanying music videos for "Halo" and "Diva" premiered simultaneously on the US iTunes Store on December 23, 2008. Shot in late November 2008 in a SoHo townhouse owned by Beyoncé, the video was directed by Philip Andelman and features actor Michael Ealy as Beyoncé's love interest. Ealy was happy to work with Beyoncé, as he had loved the song immediately after hearing it. This was the second time he was asked to star in a video for a song by Beyoncé; the first was "Irreplaceable", which he had refused because he did not appreciate its theme and concept. He had advised Beyoncé: "Call me when you have a hero role".

The video, which Beyoncé has considered intimate and romantic, begins as she stands against a wall, illuminated by light that passes through a window. In one scene, Beyoncé's character, dressed in a skin-tight leotard, performs a dance sequence while her love interest looks down at her from a balcony. According to Michael Slezak of Entertainment Weekly, the dance routines pay homage to the 1983 romantic drama film Flashdance. Beyoncé and Ealy later stare adoringly at each other as they snuggle on a sofa. During the climax of the video, Beyoncé is shown underwater, dressed in white, moving slowly upwards. As the chorus begins, she opens her eyes; after Ealy kisses the back of her neck, the pair come face to face in the final scene, in which Beyoncé lies in bed, with Ealy above her. Jennifer Cady of E! Online wrote that the bright shiny lights in the video "make [Beyoncé] look like an angel". Lecturer Sadeka Sabrina Haque was critical of the music video, saying that the music videos from the I Am... side portray Beyoncé as defenseless and thereby contributing to "the stereotypical degradation of black people into childlike status". The video was ranked at number 74 on BET's Notarized: Top 100 Videos of 2009 countdown. By April 2020, the video had received over one billion views on YouTube, becoming Beyoncé's first to achieve it.

An alternative video surfaced online in late May 2010, explaining why Beyoncé's character was remembering her love interest in the original version. It begins with a view of the night sky and many trees, as Beyoncé drives a car and Ealy's character is chased by the police through a forest. As the video progresses, she parks her car on the side of the road and scenes from the original version are shown. Police dogs eventually catch Ealy's character and attack him savagely. An open bag reveals stolen money, which is dispersed by the wind. At the end of the video, in the forest, Beyoncé finds Ealy lying lifelessly on the ground.

== Live performances and tributes ==
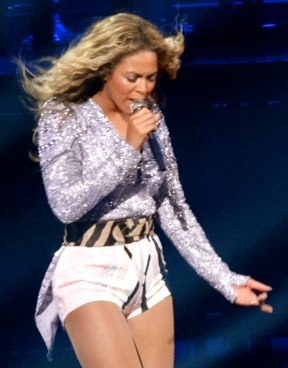
Beyoncé performing "Halo" during The Mrs. Carter Show World Tour in Montreal, Canada

Beyoncé's first live performance of "Halo" was at the NAACP Awards on February 12, 2009. She sang the ballad while archival footage from the Civil Rights Movement was shown in the background. Brennan Williams of Entertainment Newswire wrote that Beyoncé's "breathtaking performance" showed why she received the 2009 Outstanding Female Artist award. She also sang "Halo" on the Late Show with David Letterman on April 22, 2009, and on Today the following day. "Halo" was later added to the set list of her I Am... Tour in 2009–10, when it was performed during the concert's encore. After Beyoncé finished "Single Ladies", she sang "Halo" initially on stage before descending to shake hands with everybody in the front rows. Deborah McAleese and Lauren Mulvenny of The Belfast Telegraph commented that she did it with "great passion". It was included on her CD/DVD live albums I Am... Yours: An Intimate Performance at Wynn Las Vegas and I Am... World Tour (2010). Beyoncé performed "Halo" live as the closing song at her historic headlining Glastonbury Festival Performance on June 26, 2011.

On February 3, 2013, Beyoncé performed the song during the Super Bowl XLVII halftime show. "Halo" was added to the set list of her The Mrs. Carter Show World Tour (2013–14) where it was preceded by a short a cappella performance of "I Will Always Love You". In 2014, during the On the Run Tour, Beyoncé's co-headlining venture with Jay-Z, the song was performed during the end of the concert along with "Young Forever". Throughout the performance, home videos of the pair and their daughter Blue Ivy were shown on the screen on the stage. A live rendition during a stop in Paris was broadcast on September 20, 2014 on HBO during a documentary special chronicling the tour. The following day, a seven-minute video of the medley was released on Beyoncé's official YouTube channel. "Halo" was added to the set list of her The Formation World Tour (2016).

Beyoncé has performed "Halo" for several tributes. On June 25, 2009, American singer Michael Jackson died. During some concerts, an image of Jackson was shown on the main screen and she changed the lyrics to "Michael I can see your halo / I pray your music won't fade away". On January 12, 2010, Haiti was struck by an earthquake. A charity telethon called Hope for Haiti Now: A Global Benefit for Earthquake Relief took place on January 22, 2010, in which many artists participated. Beyoncé performed an acoustic version of "Halo" with Coldplay's lead vocalist Chris Martin playing the acoustic guitar. To make the song match the night's purpose, She sang "Haiti, we can see your halo / You know you're my saving grace / You're everything I need and more, it's written all over your face / Haiti, we can see your halo / I pray you won't fade away". The version was included on the 2010 live album Hope for Haiti Now. Following the death of Whitney Houston earlier that year, Beyoncé performed a tribute during her Live revue in May 2012, at the Revel resort in Atlantic City, New Jersey. Beyoncé began the performance of "Halo" singing the first verse of Houston's "I Will Always Love You". Maura Johnston of The Village Voice praised the performance noting that "the most basically structured song [...] could be turned into something glorious with the right singer". Kyle Anderson of Entertainment Weekly wrote that it was "the most attention-grabbing moments of the night". Ben Ratliff of The New York Times highlighted the performance. In January 2020, Kobe Bryant and his daughter Gianna died in a helicopter crash. Beyoncé sang "Halo" during their memorial the following month.

== Cover versions and usage in media ==
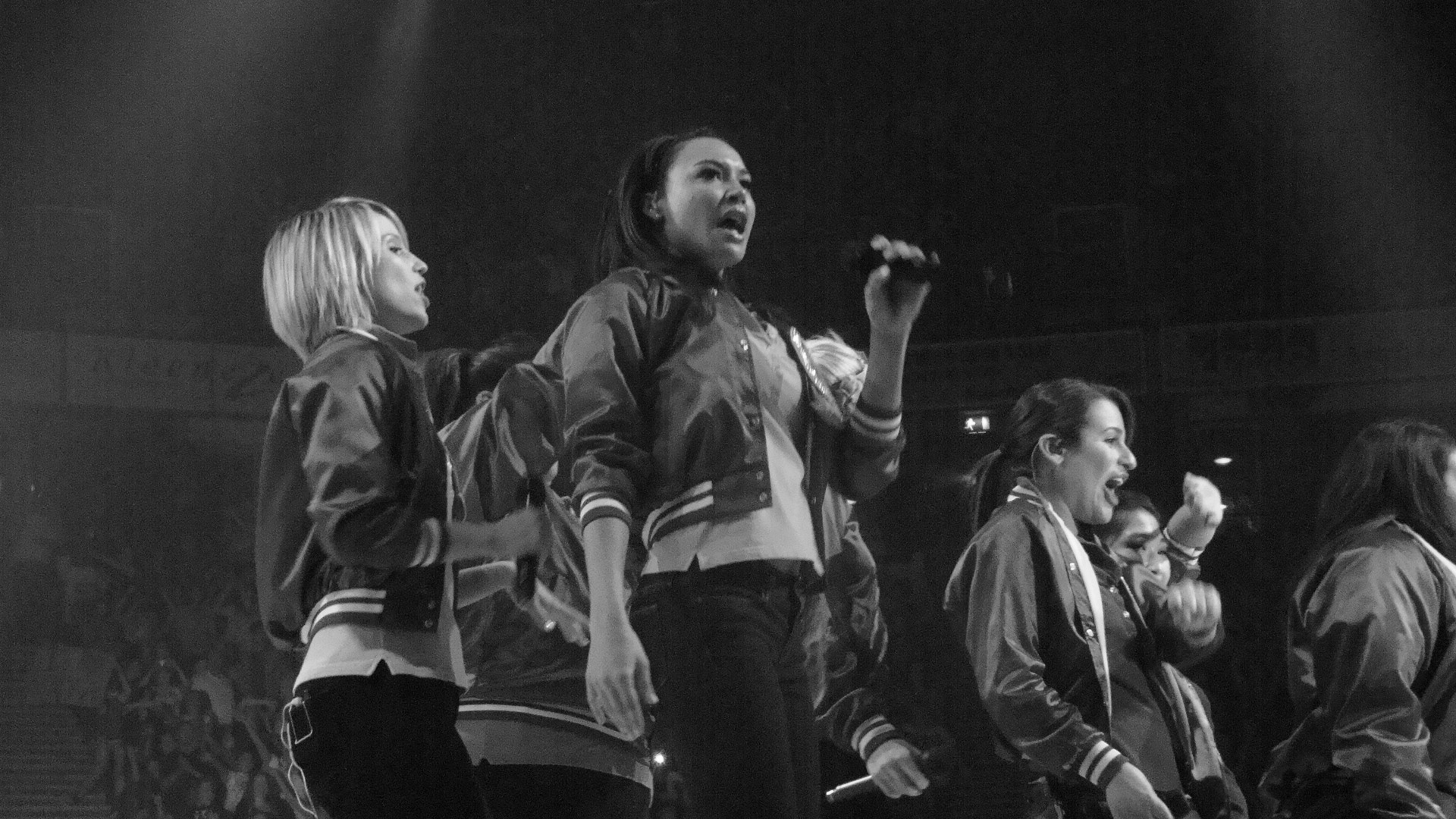
In 2009, members of the Glee cast (pictured) performed a mash-up cover of "Halo" and "Walking on Sunshine".

"Halo" was blended with the Katrina and the Waves' 1985 song "Walking on Sunshine", in the "Vitamin D" episode (2009) of the Fox Broadcasting Company television show Glee. Released as a single, their version peaked at number 4 on the Irish Singles Chart, number 8 on the UK Official Download Chart, number 9 on the UK Singles Chart, number 10 on the ARIA Singles Chart, number 28 on the Canadian Hot 100 chart, and number 40 on the Hot 100 chart. It was certified gold by ARIA, denoting shipment of 35,000 copies. The mash-up was included on the set list of the group's debut concert Glee Live! In Concert! (2010–11).

In 2009, "Halo" was covered by Florence and the Machine on BBC Radio 1's Live Lounge. Elementary school group PS22 Chorus covered "Halo" and "Single Ladies" during the 2009 Billboard Women in Music luncheon held at The Pierre in New York City. At the 2009 MTV Europe Music Awards, American singer Katy Perry performed a mash-up of "Halo" and the other Best Song nominees. American singer Mike Posner also covered the ballad with different lyrics, and included it on his 2009 mixtape A Matter of Time. According to an MTV writer, Posner's rendition was "a refreshing take on the original". The song was blended with "How to Break a Heart" by the Irish boy band Westlife, on their 2010 Where We Are Tour. On February 5, 2012, the team on the Australian talent show, Young Talent Time, sang "Halo" as the closing song of that night. On April 17, 2013, Angie Miller, a contestant on the 12th season of American Idol covered the song during an episode of the show. Melissa Locker of Rolling Stone magazine commented that she was "at her best" and "managed to tap into that power sans piano".

"Halo" has been covered by other musicians, including Ailee, ceo, Harper Blynn, Chris Sebastian and the Kingdom Choir. Marc Hogan of Pitchfork Media wrote that no cover has been "quite as inspired or as perversely logical" as the one by ceo. He added that it was built on bumpy beats, and his version makes use of an acoustic guitar, 1980s-era stylized electric guitar, strings, and horns, and ends with a rapped outro. A dancehall cover of "Halo" by Major Lazer, with lead vocals by Elephant Man, was posted on the former's Twitter account the night after Beyoncé won Best Female Pop Vocal Performance at the 2011 Grammy Awards. Simon Vozick-Levinson of Entertainment Weekly commented that their version "stays fairly close to the original, except with Elephant Man growling instead of Beyoncé belting the verses". A 2012 cover by singer-songwriter LP was described by MTV as "[finding] the perfect balance between making it her own and preserving the integrity of the original melody". In 2013, "Halo" was covered by the Icelandic band Hjaltalín, with their version of "Halo" appearing as the B-side of their single "Crack in a Stone".

A gospel-style version of the song was recorded by Jahméne and was released on his album Love Never Fails (2013). Indian singer Sunidhi Chauhan covered the ballad during a concert at the Royal Albert Hall in London in late September 2013. A writer of The Times of India included the performance of the song as one of the highlights of the concert. In 2013 Ane Brun, accompanied by Linnea Olsson on cello and backing vocals, released a "personal and stripped-down" version of "Halo" on her album Rarities. This cover is included on the soundtrack of the 2014 movie If I Stay. "Halo" was included on the international soundtrack of Caminho das Índias, an Emmy Award-winning Brazilian soap opera. "Halo" is featured on the British compilation album Now! 73.

In 2021, Xbox made a reference to the song via Twitter. This gesture also mentioned Master Chief, the main protagonist of the series which shares the same name as the song.

== Formats and track listings ==
- Australia single
1. "Halo" – 4:21
2. "Single Ladies (Put a Ring on It)" (RedTop Remix Radio Edit) – 3:32
- Europe single
1. "Halo" – 4:22
2. "Diva" – 3:21
- Germany premium CD
1. "Halo" (Album Version) – 4:22
2. "Diva" (Album Version) – 3:21
3. "Halo" (Dave Audé Remix – Radio Edit) – 4:10
4. "Halo" (Enhanced Video) – 3:44
- UK single EP
1. "Halo" (Olli Collins & Fred Portelli Remix) – 6:58
2. "Halo" (The New Devices Remix) – 5:49
3. "Halo" (My Digital Enemy Remix) – 6:33
4. "Halo" – 4:21
- Canada and US single and remixes – EP
1. "Halo" (Radio Edit) – 3:44
2. "Halo" (Dave Audé Club Remix) – 8:54
3. "Halo" (Gomi Club Remix) – 8:57
4. "Halo" (Karmatronic Club Remix) – 7:13
5. "Halo" (Lost Daze Club Remix) – 8:02

== Charts ==
=== Weekly charts ===
Weekly chart performance
Chart (2009–2012)	Peak position
Australia (ARIA)	3
Austria (Ö3 Austria Top 40)	6
Belgium (Ultratop 50 Flanders)	18
Belgium (Ultratop 50 Wallonia)	15
Brazil (Crowley Broadcast Analysis)	1
Bulgaria (BAMP)	5
Canada Hot 100 (Billboard)	3
Canada Hot 100 (Billboard) Acoustic version	58
Canada AC (Billboard)	8
Canada CHR/Top 40 (Billboard)	5
Canada Hot AC (Billboard)	1
CIS Airplay (TopHit)	26
Croatia International Airplay (HRT)	2
Czech Republic (Rádio Top 100)	2
Denmark (Tracklisten)	15
Denmark Airplay (Tracklisten)	2
European Hot 100 Singles (Billboard)	4
Finland Download (Latauslista)	18
French Downloads (SNEP)	9
Germany (GfK)	5
Global Dance Tracks (Billboard)	9
Greece Digital Song Sales (Billboard)	10
Hungary (Rádiós Top 40)	17
Ireland (IRMA)	4
Italy (FIMI)	5
Italy Airplay (EarOne)	2
Mexico Anglo (Monitor Latino)	4
Norway (VG-lista)	1
New Zealand (Recorded Music NZ)	2
Netherlands (Single Top 100)	14
Netherlands (Dutch Top 40)	9
Portugal Digital Song Sales (Billboard)	1
Romania Airplay (Media Forest)	6
Russia Airplay (TopHit)	25
Scottish Singles Sales (Official Charts)	4
Slovakia (Rádio Top 100)	1
South Korea International Downloads (Gaon)	6
Spain (Promusicae)	5
Sweden (Sverigetopplistan)	8
Sweden (Sverigetopplistan) Acoustic version	23
Switzerland (Schweizer Hitparade)	4
UK Singles (Official Charts)	4
UK Hip Hop/R&B (Official Charts)	2
US Billboard Hot 100	5
US Adult Contemporary (Billboard)	27
US Adult R&B Songs (Billboard)	39
US Adult Pop Airplay (Billboard)	22
US Bubbling Under Hot 100 Singles (Billboard) Acoustic version	5
US Dance Club Songs (Billboard)	1
US Hot R&B/Hip-Hop Songs (Billboard)	16
US Pop Airplay (Billboard)	2
US R&B/Hip-Hop Digital Songs (Billboard) Acoustic version	23
US Rhythmic Airplay (Billboard)	8

Chart (2013)	Peak position
Scottish Singles Sales (Official Charts)	43
UK Singles (Official Charts)	45
UK Hip Hop/R&B (Official Charts)	9

Chart (2016)	Peak position
France (SNEP)	39

Chart (2022)	Peak position
Poland Airplay (ZPAV)	66

Chart (2026)	Peak position
Israel International Airplay (Media Forest)	20

=== Monthly charts ===
Monthly chart performance
Chart (2009)	Position
Brazil (Hot 100 Airplay)	1
Brazil (Hot Pop Songs)	1
CIS (Tophit)	32

=== Year-end charts ===
Annual chart rankings
Chart (2009)	Position
Australia (ARIA)	7
Australia Urban (ARIA)	4
Austria (Ö3 Austria Top 40)	35
Belgium (Ultratop Flanders)	72
Belgium (Ultratop Wallonia)	70
Brazil (Hot 100 Airplay)	1
Canada (Canadian Hot 100)	12
CIS (TopHit)	126
Croatia International Airplay (HRT)	10
Denmark (Tracklisten)	40
European Hot 100 Singles (Billboard)	33
Germany (Official German Chart)	18
Hungary (Rádiós Top 40)	87
Ireland (IRMA)	18
Italy (FIMI)	28
Netherlands (Dutch Top 40)	57
Netherlands (Single Top 100)	91
New Zealand (Recorded Music NZ)	8
Norway (VG-lista)	5
Russia Airplay (TopHit)	132
Spain (PROMUSICAE)	9
Sweden (Sverigetopplistan)	5
Switzerland (Schweizer Hitparade)	18
UK Singles (OCC)	25
US Billboard Hot 100	24
US Hot R&B/Hip-Hop Songs (Billboard)	79
US Mainstream Top 40 (Billboard)	18
US Rhythmic (Billboard)	34

Chart (2010)	Position
Australia Urban (ARIA)	39

Chart (2011)	Position
Belgium (Ultratop 50 Flanders Catalog)	71

Chart (2012)	Position
South Korea International (Gaon)	10
South Korea International (Gaon)	166
Belgium (Ultratop 50 Flanders Catalog)	85

Chart (2013)	Position
Australia Urban (ARIA)	42
Belgium (Ultratop 50 Flanders Catalog)	54
Belgium (Ultratop 50 Wallonia Catalog)	71
South Korea International (Gaon)	20

Chart (2014)	Position
Australia Urban (ARIA)	39
Belgium (Ultratop 50 Wallonia Catalog)	84
South Korea International (Gaon)	58

Chart (2015)	Position
Australia Urban (ARIA)	46
Belgium (Ultratop 50 Flanders Catalog)	88
Belgium (Ultratop 50 Wallonia Catalog)	60
South Korea International (Gaon)	33

Chart (2016)	Position
Australia Urban (ARIA)	37
Belgium (Ultratop 50 Wallonia Catalog)	100
South Korea International (Gaon)	39

Chart (2017)	Position
Australia Urban (ARIA)	45
Belgium (Ultratop 50 Wallonia Catalog)	96
South Korea International (Gaon)	89

=== Decade-end charts ===
Decennium chart rankings
Chart (2000–2009)	Position
Australia (ARIA)	32
Brazil (Hot 100 Airplay)	1

== Certifications ==
Certifications and sales
Region	Certification	Certified units/sales
Australia (ARIA)	13× Platinum	910,000^{‡}
Brazil (Pro-Música Brasil)	Diamond	250,000^{‡}
Canada (Music Canada)	9× Platinum	720,000^{‡}
Denmark (IFPI Danmark)	3× Platinum	270,000^{‡}
Germany (BVMI)	3× Gold	900,000^{‡}
Italy (FIMI)	3× Platinum	150,000^{‡}
Mexico (AMPROFON)	Gold	30,000^{*}
New Zealand (RMNZ)	7× Platinum	210,000^{‡}
Norway (IFPI Norway)	Gold	30,000^{‡}
Portugal (AFP)	Platinum	20,000^{‡}
South Korea (Note: Sales from 2012 until 2017)	—	2,011,627
Spain (Promusicae)	2× Platinum	80,000^{*}
Switzerland (IFPI Switzerland)	Platinum	30,000^{^}
United Kingdom (BPI)	5× Platinum	3,000,000^{‡}
United States (RIAA)	11× Platinum	11,000,000^{‡}
United States (RIAA) Mastertone	Gold	500,000^{*}
^{*} Sales figures based on certification alone.^{^} Shipments figures based on certification alone.^{‡} Sales+streaming figures based on certification alone.

== Release history ==
Release dates and formats
Region	Date	Format(s)	Label(s)	Ref.
United States	January 20, 2009	Contemporary hit radio	Columbia	
Australia	February 20, 2009	Digital download	Sony Music	
New Zealand	February 20, 2009	Digital download	Sony Music	
Australia	February 23, 2009	CD	Sony Music	
Germany	March 19, 2009	Digital download	Sony Music	
France	March 20, 2009	Digital download	Sony Music	
Italy	March 20, 2009	Radio airplay	Sony Music	
Germany	April 3, 2009	CD; maxi CD	Sony Music	
Germany	April 13, 2009	12-inch vinyl	Sony Music	
United Kingdom	April 13, 2009	CD; digital download (EP)	RCA	
Canada	April 14, 2009	12-inch vinyl; digital download (EP)	Sony Music	
United States	April 14, 2009	Digital download (EP)	Columbia; Music World	

== See also ==
- List of best-selling singles
- List of best-selling singles in Australia
- List of best-selling singles in South Korea
- List of highest-certified digital singles in the United States
- List of Billboard Hot Dance Club Play number ones of 2009
- List of Hot 100 number-one singles of 2009 (Brazil)
- List of most-downloaded songs in the United Kingdom
- List of number-one pop hits of 2009 (Brazil)
- List of number-one songs in Norway of 2009
- List of songs which have spent the most weeks on the UK Singles Chart
