= List of number-one pop hits of 2009 (Brazil) =

This is a list of number one Pop singles on the Billboard Brasil Hot Pop chart in 2009. Note that Billboard publishes a monthly chart. The first number-one single on the chart was "Halo" by Beyoncé.

== Chart history ==
Issue date	Song	Artist(s)
October	"Halo"	Beyoncé
November	"Halo"	Beyoncé
December	"I Want to Know What Love Is"	Mariah Carey

== See also ==
- Billboard Brasil
- List of Hot 100 number-one singles of 2009 (Brazil)
