= Multishow Brazilian Music Award for Brega/Arrocha of the Year =

Brazilian music industry award

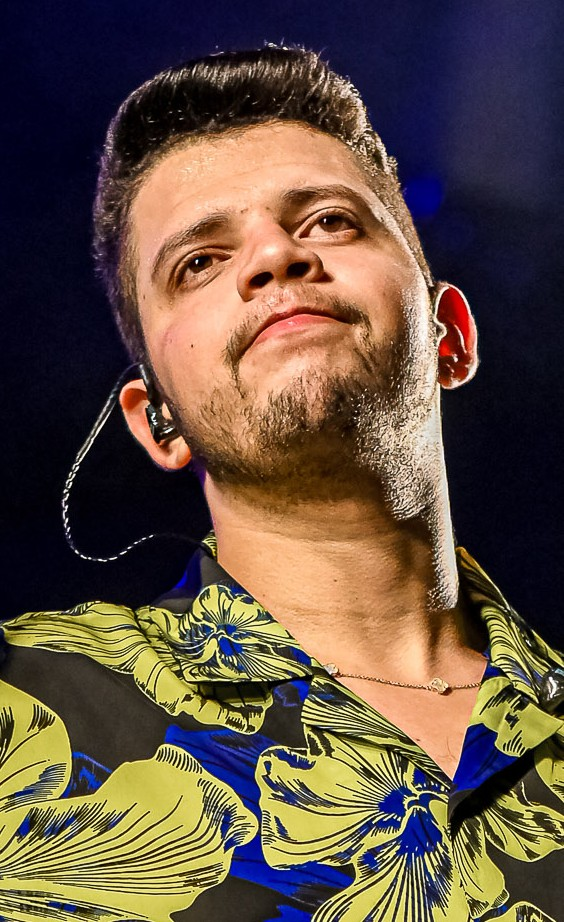
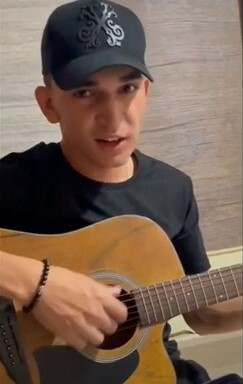
- "Sinal" by Nadson o Ferinha and João Gomes is the first and last recipient (2023)
- Awarded for: Brega and arrocha songs
- Country: Brazil
- Presented by: Multishow
- First award: 2023
- Final award: 2023

Highlights
- Most nominations: Nadson o Ferinha (3)
- Website: Official website

The Multishow Brazilian Music Award for Brega/Arrocha of the Year was an award presented at the 2023 Multishow Brazilian Music Awards, to artists for brega and arrocha songs. The award was first presented to Nadson o Ferinha and João Gomes for the song "Sinal". Nadson o Ferinha holds the record for most nominations, with three. The award was discontinued in 2024 and was split into the categories for Arrocha of the Year and Brega of the Year.

== History ==
For the 2023 ceremony, the Multishow Awards Academy announced several changes and introduction of new categories. The Academy has expanded to more than 900 members, composed by members of the music industry, with diversity in gender, race, color, musical genres, and region. Additionally, new categories were introduced to recognize artists and musical genres. One of these categories is Brega/Arrocha of the Year, to recognize brega and arrocha genres. The award was presented only in 2023, won by Nadson o Ferinha and João Gomes for the song "Sinal". In 2024, the award was discontinued and split into two separate categories for Arrocha of the Year and Brega of the Year.

== Recipients ==
=== 2020s ===
Recipients
Year	Winner(s)	Nominees	Ref.
2023	Nadson o Ferinha and João Gomes – "Sinal"	Ávine Vinny and Nattan – "Anota Aí (Ao Vivo)"; Thales Lessa and Nadson o Ferinha – "Cadê Seu Namorado Moça?"; Dilsinho, Nadson o Ferinha e Rafinha RSQ – "Duas (Versão Arrocha)"; Nattan e Felipe Amorim – "Love Gostosinho"; Felipe Amorim – "Toca o Trompete"	

== Artists with multiple nominations ==
3 nominations

- Nadson o Ferinha

2 nominations

- Nattan
- Felipe Amorim
