= J. Eskine =

Brazilian singer and songwriter (born 1999)

- Also known as: Jonathan Eskine; Gângster do Arrocha
- Born: Jonathan Souza Santana; 29 December 1999 (age 26); Salvador, Bahia, Brazil
- Genres: Arrocha; trap; hip-hop
- Occupations: Singer; songwriter
- Instrument: Vocals
- Years active: 2018-present
- Label: Hitlab

Jonathan Souza Santana (born 29 December 1999), better known as J. Eskine, is a Brazilian singer and songwriter. He gained national prominence in late 2024 with the release of the song "Resenha do Arrocha", which reached number one on the Billboard Brasil Hot 100. He is one of the most popular artists in Brazil in 2025 according to the Billboard Artistas 25 list.

J. Eskine began his musical career in 2018, singing trap-style songs and sharing videos and recordings on his social media. Between 2018 and 2019, he also participated in rap battles with friends, posting the recordings on YouTube.

== Biography ==
Jonathan Souza Santana was born in the Uruguai neighborhood of Salvador, Bahia, on 29 December 1999. Born into an evangelical family, Jonathan began his career as a musician while still in school, where he sang and played the guitar with a friend during class breaks. Before becoming famous, Santana performed on buses, at boat terminals, and at cultural fairs in Salvador, where he performed songs by other Brazilian artists to raise money and help his family back home.

== Discography ==
=== Extended plays (EP) ===
Title	Details
Gângster Também Ama	Released: 13 December 2024; Label: HITLAB Records; Format: Digital download, streaming
O Que Bate É Maluquice	Released: 31 January 2025; Label: HITLAB Records; Format: Digital download, streaming
Seresta Do Pai Das Crianças (with Tierry and Seresta do Rasta)	Released: 7 February 2025; Label: Virgin Music Group; Format: Digital download, streaming

=== Singles ===
==== As lead artist ====
Song	Year	Album
Brisa da Maré As Jonathan Eskine	2018	Non-album singles
Força As Jonathan Eskine (com 808 Ander)	2018	Non-album singles
Libertar Como Jonathan Eskine (com Timothy Infinite)	2019	Non-album singles
Ciclozin As Jonathan Eskine	2019	Non-album singles
Brota As Jonathan Eskine (com Vine MC)	2020	Non-album singles
Faixada (with Shook e B.I.G Carter)	2020	Non-album singles
Minha Saída	2020	Non-album singles
Delira (with Alef Donk e 7marys)	2021	Non-album singles
Sede	2021	Non-album singles
Dócil (with Jheff e Lcs)	2021	Non-album singles
Naquela Noite	2024	Non-album singles
Resenha do Arrocha (with Alef Donk)	2024	Non-album singles
Rala Xerekinha - Joga No Coroa (with Wilson Castro)	2024	Non-album singles
Resenha do Arrocha 2.0 (with Alef Donk)	2024	Non-album singles
Medo de Amar (with Silvanno Salles and Alef Donk)	2025	O Que Bate É Maluquice
Resenha do Arrocha 3.0 (with Alef Donk)	2025	O Que Bate É Maluquice
Rala Em Mim (with Alef Donk, Mc Luuky and Dj Glenner)	2025	O Que Bate É Maluquice

==== As featured artist ====
Song	Year	Artist(s)	Albums
Chama Os Moleque	2019	Mc Negrito, Nenê Cantista, Mc Kenno Junios	Non-album singles
Até Que a Peto nos Separe	2020	Bel4triz, Fiaes, Dublack Sons, Shook, Mansha, Sholdmc	Non-album singles
4 Da Manhã	2021	Vin& Do Beat	Non-album singles
Meu Time	2021	Vin& Do Beat, Nenê Cantista, Mano Xandã0, Jc Rodrigues	Non-album singles
Ela Vem de Longe	2025	Aaron Modesto, DG e Batidão Stronda, Mc Luuky	Non-album singles
Mãe Solteira	2025	DG e Batidao Stronda, Mc Davi and Mc G15	Non-album singles

=== Other songs ===
Song	Year	Album
Zona	2024	Gângster Também Ama
Gelo em Chamas	2024	Gângster Também Ama
Cineminha Com Pipoca	2024	Gângster Também Ama
Má Fase	2024	Gângster Também Ama
Resenha 1 a 8	2025	O Que Bate É Maluquice
Resenha de Ex-Love	2025	O Que Bate É Maluquice
