= Artistas 25 =

Billboard Brasil chart

The Artistas 25 is a chart published weekly by Billboard Brasil. Updated every Tuesday, the Billboard Brasil Artistas 25 ranks the most popular artists in Brazil based on the streaming activity of major music services, reflecting the one thousand most played songs, determined by a weighted formula incorporating official-only streams on both subscription and ad-supported tiers of audio and video music services. All data are provided by Luminate.

== Number-one artists ==
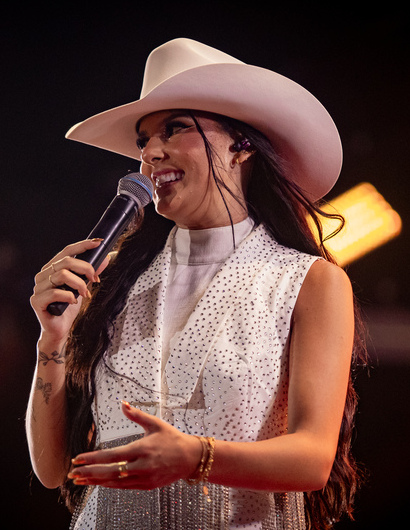
Ana Castela is the artist with the most weeks atop the Billboard Brasil Artistas 25.

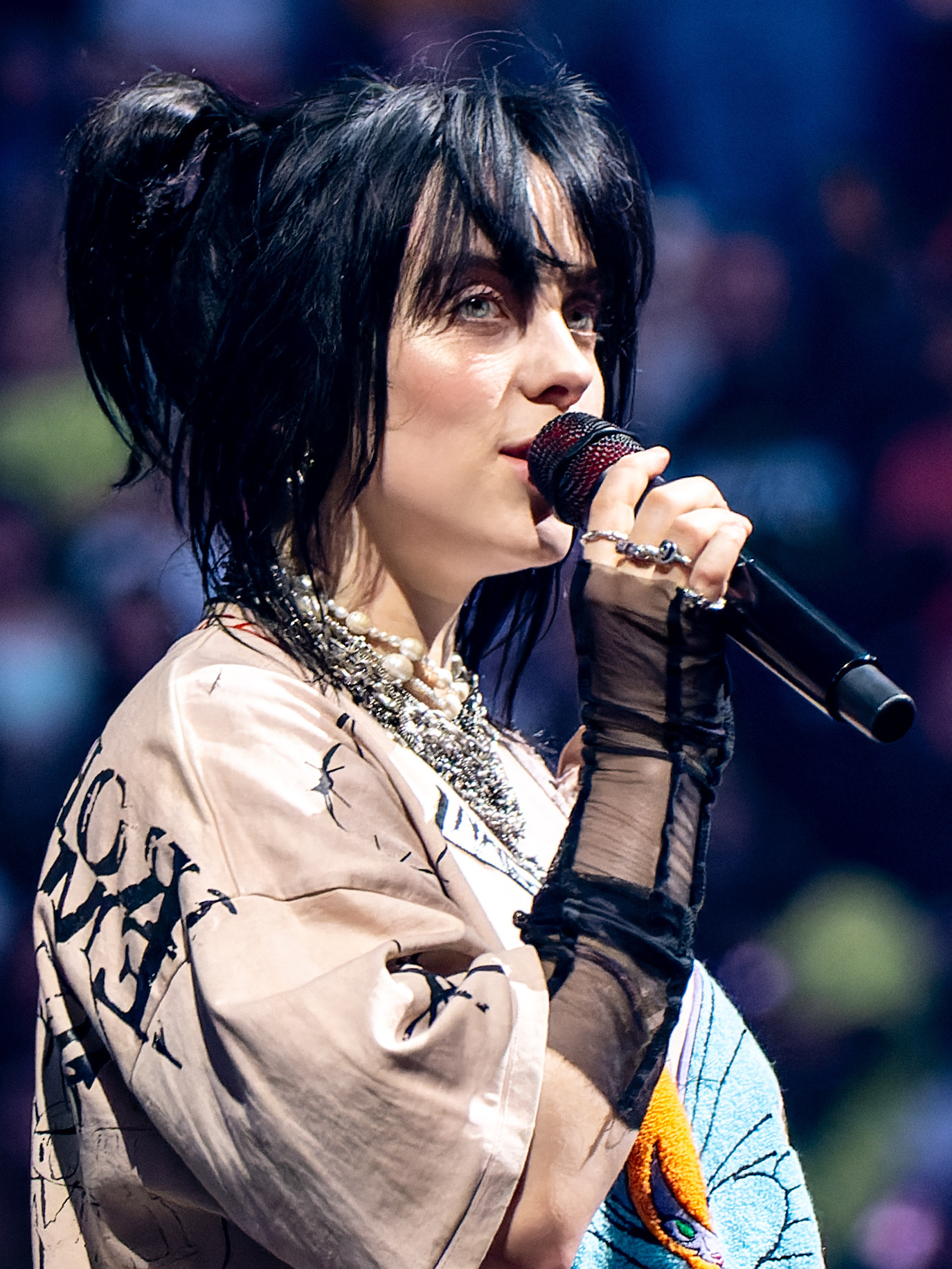
Billie Eilish was the first international artist to top the Artistas 25.

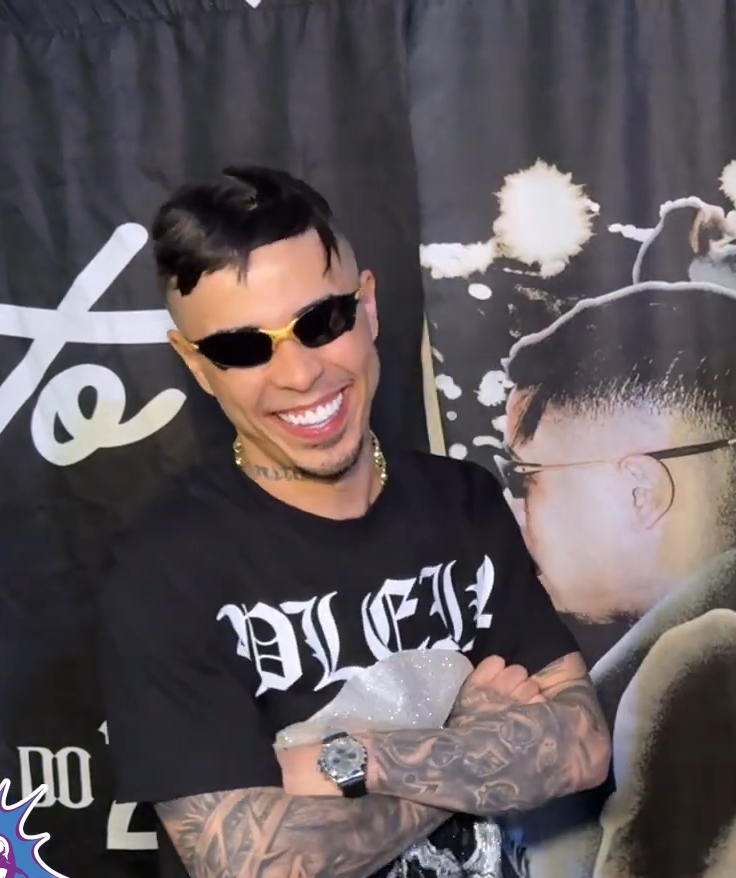
MC Tuto is the male artist with the most weeks at the top.

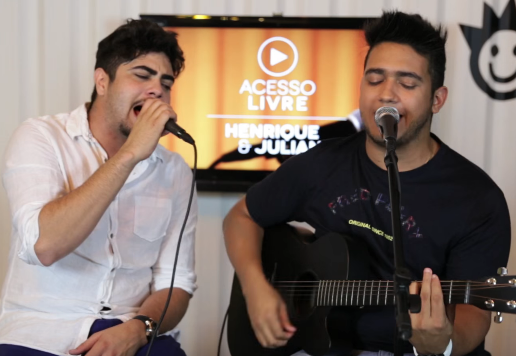
Henrique & Juliano are the duo/group with the most weeks at the top.

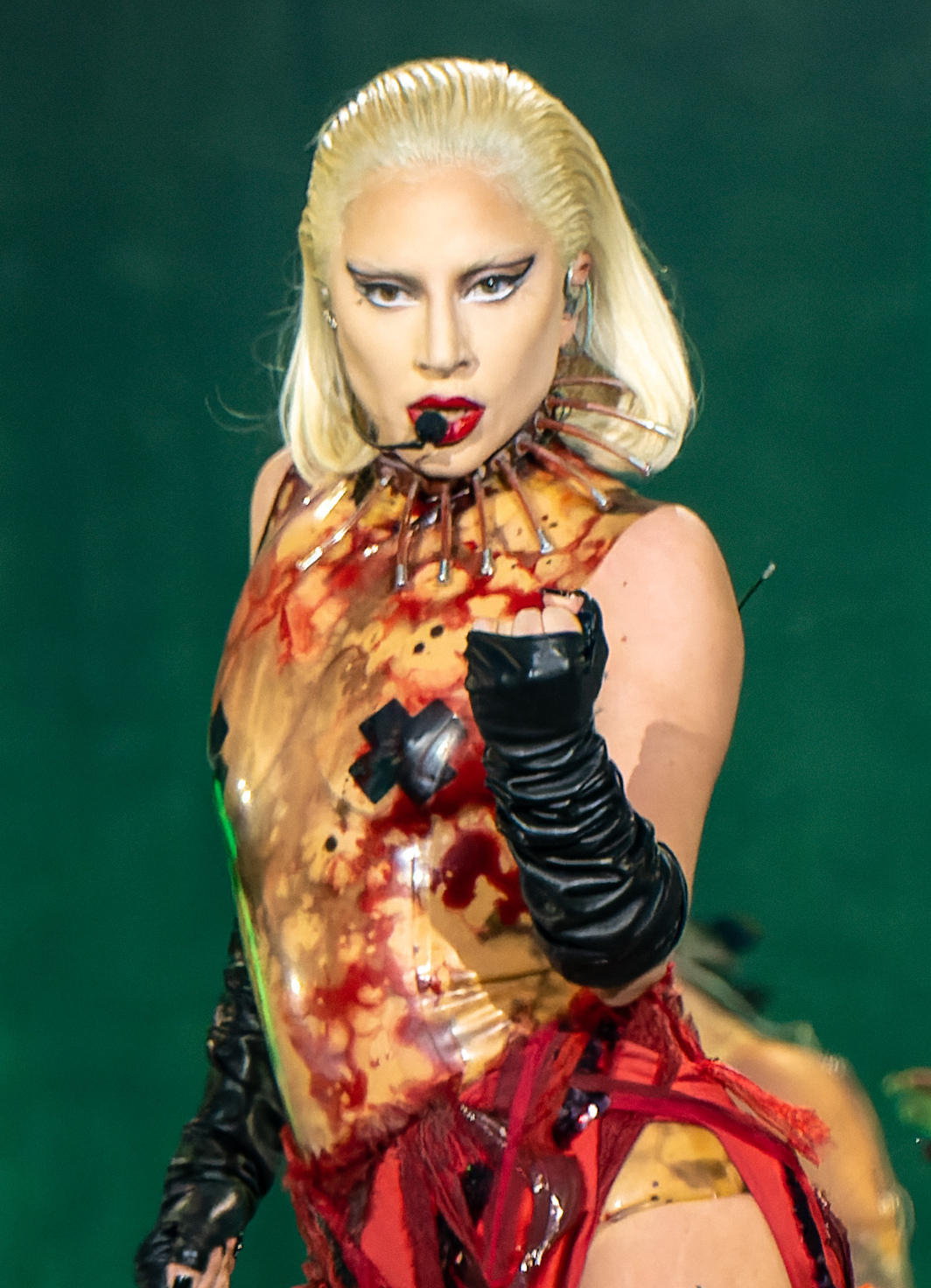
Lady Gaga is the international artist with the most weeks at the top.

=== 2023 ===
| Issue date | Artist | Ref. |
|---|---|---|
| August 28 | Ana Castela | |
| September 4 | Luísa Sonza | |
| September 11 | Luísa Sonza | |
| September 18 | Ana Castela | |
| September 25 | Ana Castela | |
| October 2 | Ana Castela | |
| October 9 | Ana Castela | |
| October 16 | Ana Castela | |
| October 23 | Ana Castela | |
| October 30 | Ana Castela | |
| November 6 | Ana Castela | |
| November 13 | Ana Castela | |
| November 20 | Ana Castela | |
| November 27 | Ana Castela | |
| December 4 | Ana Castela | |
| December 11 | Ana Castela | |
| December 18 | Ana Castela | |
| December 25 | Ana Castela | |

=== 2024 ===
| Issue date | Artist | Ref. |
|---|---|---|
| January 1 | Ana Castela | |
| January 8 | Ana Castela | |
| January 15 | Ana Castela | |
| January 22 | Ana Castela | |
| January 29 | Ana Castela | |
| February 5 | Ana Castela | |
| February 12 | Ana Castela | |
| February 19 | Ana Castela | |
| February 26 | Ana Castela | |
| March 4 | Ana Castela | |
| March 11 | Ana Castela | |
| March 18 | Ana Castela | |
| March 25 | Ana Castela | |
| April 1 | Ana Castela | |
| April 8 | Ana Castela | |
| April 15 | Ana Castela | |
| April 22 | Ana Castela | |
| April 29 | Ana Castela | |
| May 6 | Anitta | |
| May 13 | Ana Castela | |
| May 20 | Ana Castela | |
| May 27 | Billie Eilish | |
| June 3 | Wesley Safadão | |
| June 10 | Simone Mendes | |
| June 17 | Ana Castela | |
| June 24 | Ana Castela | |
| July 1 | Ana Castela | |
| July 8 | Ana Castela | |
| July 15 | Ana Castela | |
| July 22 | Ana Castela | |
| July 29 | Ana Castela | |
| August 5 | Luan Pereira | |
| August 12 | Luan Pereira | |
| August 19 | Luan Pereira | |
| August 26 | Grelo | |
| September 2 | Luan Pereira | |
| September 9 | Luan Pereira | |
| September 16 | Matuê | |
| September 23 | Matuê | |
| September 30 | Matuê | |
| October 7 | Matuê | |
| October 14 | Henrique & Juliano | |
| October 21 | Henrique & Juliano | |
| October 28 | MC Tuto | |
| November 4 | MC Tuto | |
| November 11 | MC Tuto | |
| November 18 | MC Tuto | |
| November 25 | MC Tuto | |
| December 2 | MC Tuto | |
| December 9 | MC Tuto | |
| December 16 | MC Tuto | |
| December 23 | Henrique & Juliano | |
| December 30 | MC Tuto | |

=== 2025 ===
| Issue date | Artist | Ref. |
|---|---|---|
| January 6 | MC Tuto | |
| January 13 | MC Tuto | |
| January 20 | MC Tuto | |
| January 27 | MC Tuto | |
| February 3 | MC Tuto | |
| February 10 | MC Tuto | |
| February 17 | MC Tuto | |
| February 24 | MC Tuto | |
| March 3 | MC Tuto | |
| March 10 | MC Tuto | |
| March 17 | J. Eskine | |
| March 24 | J. Eskine | |
| March 31 | Henrique & Juliano | |
| April 7 | MC Tuto | |
| April 14 | None | |
| April 21 | Henrique & Juliano | |
| April 28 | Henrique & Juliano | |
| May 5 | Henrique & Juliano | |
| May 12 | Lady Gaga | |
| May 19 | Lady Gaga | |
| May 26 | Henrique & Juliano | |

== Artists with most weeks at number-one ==
| Weeks | Artist |
|---|---|
| 43 | Ana Castela |
| 20 | MC Tuto |
| 8 | Henrique & Juliano |
| 5 | Luan Pereira |
