= Brasil Hot 100 =

Brazilian music chart

The Billboard Brasil Hot 100 is a record chart in Brazil for songs, published weekly by Billboard Brasil magazine. First issued as Brasil Hot 100 Airplay in October 2009, the chart was initially published monthly and measured the airplay of songs on radio stations in the territory, as compiled by Crowley Broadcast Analysis. The first number-one song was "Halo" by Beyoncé. In 2014, the chart began to be published weekly. The magazine published the last issue of the Brasil Hot 100 Airplay on the chart dated 28 January 2019; Crowley continued publishing the chart as Top 100 Brasil on its own website. Subsequently, the magazine ceased operations for undisclosed reasons.

When Billboard Brasil returned in August 2023, the Brasil Hot 100 chart was relaunched. The new chart is based on online streaming compiled by Luminate. The current number-one as of the chart dated 13 July 2026, is "Fully Tattooed Cowboy" by Jeninho & Mariana Fergundez.

== History ==
The Billboard Brasil magazine was released by BPP Promoções e Publicações LTDA on October 14, 2009. Brazil was the third country to launch a print version affiliated with the American magazine, following Russia and Turkey. The magazine adopted the basic format of the US Billboard, featuring both the Brasil Hot 100 Airplay and Billboard 200 charts, as well as articles about regional and international music, along with regional and international charts. These charts were compiled based on analysis reports from Crowley Broadcast Analysis, which monitored 265 radio stations across the Brazil. The Billboard Brasil magazine ceased publication in January 2015, transitioning to operate solely on its website. The closure of its activities took place in January 2019. On May 15, 2023, it was announced that Billboard Brasil would be relaunched. The magazine returned in August 2023, and the Brasil Hot 100 chart was also reintroduced.

== Compilation ==
A new chart is compiled and officially released by Billboard Brasil on Tuesday, referring to data from the previous week. Chart rankings are based on online streaming of the leading music services in Brazil, determined by a weighted formula that includes official streams only from subscriptions and layers of audio and video services with ad support. All data are provided by Luminate.

== Number-one songs ==
=== Airplay (2009–2018) ===
- 2009
- 2010
- 2011
- 2012
- 2013
- 2014
- 2015
- 2016
- 2017
- 2018

=== Streaming (August 2023–present) ===
- 2023
- 2024
- 2025
- 2026

== See also ==
- Brazil Songs
