= MC Tuto =

Brazilian singer and songwriter (born 2000)

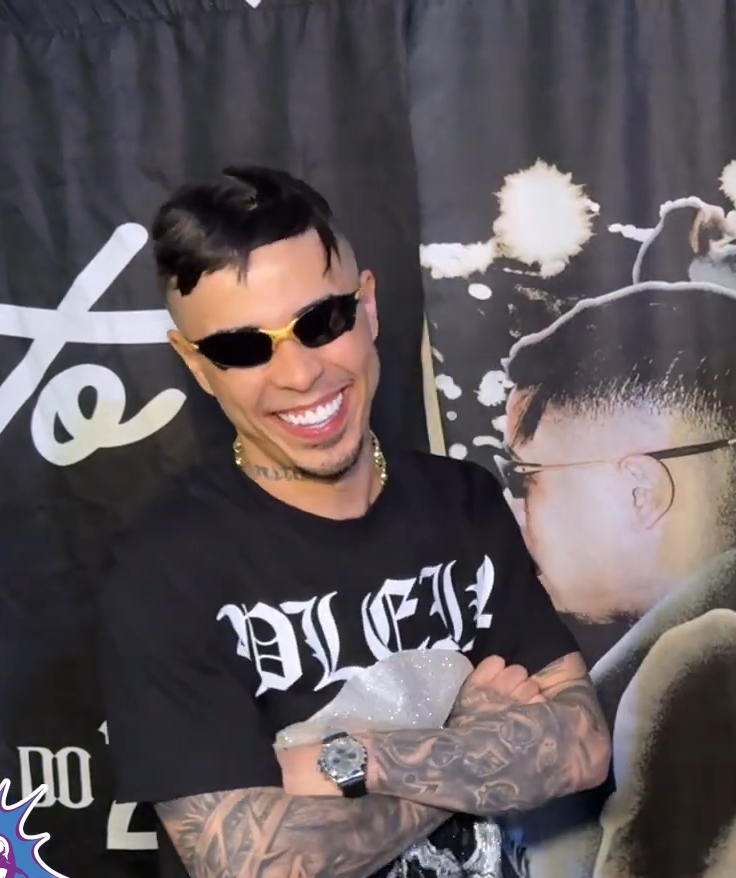
- MC Tuto in December 2024

Background information
- Born: Emerson Teixeira Muniz; 9 July 2000 (age 25); São Paulo, Brazil
- Genres: funk
- Occupations: Singer; songwriter
- Instrument: Vocals

Emerson Teixeira Muniz (born 9 July 2000), better known by his stage name MC Tuto, is a Brazilian singer and songwriter. He received greater recognition for participating in "The Box Medley Funk 2", and for his song "Barbie". He is one of the most popular artists in Brazil in 2025 according to the Billboard Artistas 25 list, where he was the second most popular artist in Brazil in April.

== Biography ==
Muniz was raised in the Ermelino Matarazzo region, and began his career in the east side of São Paulo. Before his success in music, Tuto dreamed of being a soccer player. Until the age of 14, he was focused on his career as an athlete and even tried out for clubs such as Juventus. Despite his success in funk, at that time, Tuto listened to sertanejo, largely influenced by his mother. But one day he liked a song by MC Menor da VG and invested in the style. Tuto worked at a bakery, a car wash and handed out flyers before his career took off.

In the early hours of day 24 January 2026, Muniz was arrested after driving a Porsche at high speed and running over a 20-year-old man in Barueri, in the metropolitan region of São Paulo. According to the police report, the accident occurred at 00:50, on Avenida Guilherme Perereca Guglielmo, in front of the José Corrêa Gymnasium, in Barueri, in an area where cars are prohibited. Two videos obtained by TV Globo show the exact moment when singer Muniz ran over a young man in Barueri. The images show the artist taking a selfie and driving against traffic.

On 30 January 2026, a court in São Paulo ordered the release of MC Tuto, who was arrested after running over a young man in Barueri, in Greater São Paulo.

== Discography ==
=== Albums ===
- O Tempo é Cura (2024)
- 2T Na Levada (2024)
