= Arrocha =

Arrocha is a music/dance style that originated in the interior of Bahia, one of Brazil's states, most notably in the city of Candeias.

As with the seresta and the brega, the styles from which it was generated, arrocha is a popular-oriented musical genre, whose thematic and musical lyrics are based on love stories of the people in both the interior and metropolitan regions of Bahia. Quickly spreading to success, it gained popularity in the Northeast region of Brazil. Nowadays it is popular all over the country.

== History ==
In 2004, arrocha began gaining ground in many radio stations in Bahia.

Some artists have helped spread arrocha and are now nationally recognized: Júlio Nascimento, Tayrone Cigano, Nara Costta, Asas Livres, Pablo, Grupo Arrocha, Márcio Moreno, Nano do Arrocha, Silvanno Salles, Ciel Rodrigues, Nara Costa, and Tatal Matos, considered "Queen of Arrocha,". The lyrics have much in common with Brega, with the addition of keyboard sounds and electronic beats, and the rhythm is very successful especially in the regions North and Northeast.

The term "arrocha" is recent, but the music itself has existed since the mid-1970s, when admirers of Odair José, Reginaldo Rossi, Fernando Mendes and Waldick Soriano began to sing the songs of their idols in bars and nightclubs in suburban areas or inland in the country.

After some years, although still remain strong, the pace was being forgotten by the media in general. In the late '90s, the music business entrepreneurs realize their great popular appeal in a big profit opportunity, and from there came the first idol, since 2000, called Lairton, nicknamed "Lairton and their keyboards," which became known with the song "Strawberry Northeast".

With the simplification of systems and manufacturing mix CDs, several smaller groups have emerged, which helped spread the "movement". However, despite the success in the poorest, arrocha still faces a lot of prejudice among the middle class, which simply does not consider it a genre because of their compositions that constantly portray the love life problems.

Many singers singing arrocha stood out, as Sandra Cristina, Grupo Belo Ser, Tayrone Cigano, Roberto Bessa, Nara Costa, Silvano Salles, Márcio Moreno, Asas Livres, Grupo Arrocha, Tatal Matos, Trem Xônado, Toque Novo, Latitude 10, Bonde do Maluco, Léo Magalhães, Ninjas do Arrocha, Kuarto de Empregada, Ardente Paixão, Saulo Calmon, Pablo a voz Romântica, Nano do Arrocha, Paula e a Mulherada, Trio da Huanna, among others. Today Arrocha is widely known and popular in Brazil thanks to the new sertanejo generation adding an arrocha style to the music known as Sertanejo Arrocha or Arrocha Universitário.

In the late 2010s and early 2020s, arrocha spread to the United States when the Internet Bad Boys released several arrocha-inspired songs.

== See also ==
- Baião
- Chôro
- Frevo
- Seresta
