= Billboard Brasil =

Brazilian edition of Billboard magazine

- One of the covers of the October 2023 issue, featuring Criolo and Marcelo D2
- Categories: Music and entertainment
- Frequency: Monthly
- First issue: 14 October 2009; 15 years ago (first run); 13 October 2023; 22 months ago (relaunch)
- Company: Mynd8
- Country: Brazil
- Based in: São Paulo
- Language: Portuguese
- Website: billboard.com.br
- ISSN: 2176-0543

Billboard Brasil is the Brazilian edition of the American magazine Billboard. The magazine provides music charts, news, photos and videos related to the music industry. Its charts include the Brasil Hot 100 and the Artistas 25, tracking the most popular songs and artists in various music genres.

First released in October 2009, Billboard Brasil was the third version affiliated with Billboard. The magazine eventually ceased publication in July 2014, focusing solely on its website until it ceased operations for undisclosed reasons in 2019. The magazine made its return in August 2023, and the first issue of the relaunch was released on 13 October 2023.

== History ==
=== 2009–2019: Early years and discontinuation ===
Cover of the first issue of Billboard Brasil (14 October 2009), featuring Roberto Carlos

Billboard Brasil was first announced in August 2009. It was officially launched by BPP Promoções e Publicações LTDA on 14 October 2009, with a monthly circulation of 40,000 printed copies sold at R$ 8.90. The first issue had 84 pages and featured the singer Roberto Carlos on the cover. Brazil was the third country to launch a print version affiliated with the American Billboard, following Russia and Turkey. Billboard Brasil adopted the basic format of the American magazine, featuring articles about regional and international music, along with regional and international charts, including the Brasil Hot 100 Airplay. These charts were compiled based on analysis reports from Crowley Broadcast Analysis, which monitored 265 radio stations across the Brazil. Crowley had already provided this restricted service to record labels even before the launch of Billboard Brasil. The last printed issue of the magazine was the 49th, published in July 2014. The 50th issue, published in January 2015, was available only in digital format. Subsequently, Billboard Brasil ceased publication and focused solely on its website. The discontinuation of its operations took place in January 2019.

=== 2023–present: Relaunching of Billboard Brasil ===
Brazil did not have a Billboard's existing music charts after the brand's cessation in 2019 until 2022, when Billboard launched on 14 February 2022, the Hits of the World, a collection of charts around the world that ranks the top 25 songs weekly in more than 40 countries around the globe; part of this collection is the Brazil Songs chart.

On 15 May 2023, it was announced that Billboard Brasil would be relaunched under Mynd8. The magazine returned in August 2023. Its first issue of the relaunch was released on 13 October 2023. The magazine arrived with four different covers, featuring Criolo and Marcelo D2, Post Malone, Bebe Rexha, and Luísa Sonza. In 2023, the magazine began promoting the WME Awards, which is similar to Billboard Women in Music.

== Charts ==
Chart title	Description
Brasil Hot 100	Ranks the top songs within Brazil and is based on streaming activity from leading music services in the territory.
Artistas 25	Ranks the most popular artists in Brazil based on the streaming activity of major music services in the territory.
Brasil Hot 100-Radio	Ranks the top songs within Brazil and is based on radio airplay audience in the territory, as compiled by Crowley Broadcast Analysis.
Artistas 25-Radio	Ranks the most popular artists in Brazil based on radio airplay audience, as compiled by Crowley Broadcast Analysis.
Sua Música Billboard Brasil Top 50	Ranks the top songs on the music service Sua Música and is based on streaming activity.

=== International charts ===
Chart title	Description
Billboard Hot 100	Ranks the top songs in the United States, based on airplay, digital downloads, and streaming.
Billboard 200	Ranks the most popular albums and EPs in the United States, based on album sales, track equivalent albums (TEA) and streaming equivalent albums (SEA).
Billboard Global 200	Ranks the top songs globally and is based on digital sales and streaming from over 200 territories worldwide.
