= 2015 in Latin music =

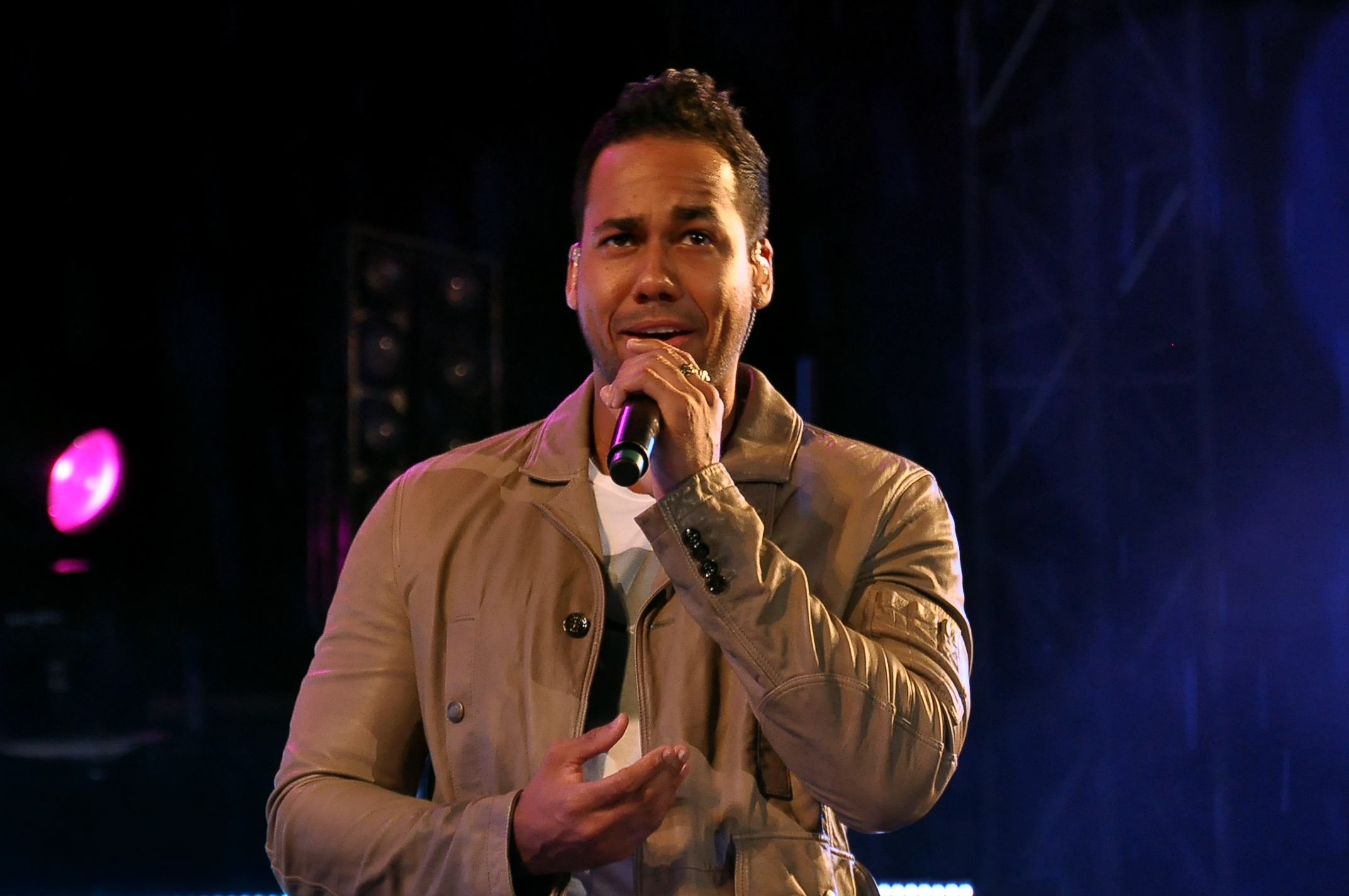
American singer-songwriter Romeo Santos was named Top Latin Artist of the Year for the second consecutive time in the United States by Billboard.

This is a list of notable events in Latin music (i.e. Spanish- and Portuguese-speaking music from Latin America, Europe, and the United States) that took place in 2015.

== Events ==
- January 7 – The Nielsen Media Research releases the 2014 United States music report, showing that Latin music contributed 2.6% of total music sales.
- January 9 — PROMUSICAE introduces a new chart which combines streaming, downloads, and physical sales.
- February 3 – Puerto Rican singer Ivy Queen releases four albums, something "that nobody in the industry ever did before," according to Fox News Latino.
- February 19 – Spanish singer Enrique Iglesias and American singer-songwriter Romeo Santos became the most awarded performers on the 27th Lo Nuestro Awards with both earning six awards each. Guatemalan singer-songwriter Ricardo Arjona is awarded the Excellence Award while Italian singer Laura Pausini received an award for her musical trajectory.
- April 30 – Romeo Santos is the biggest winner at the 2015 Billboard Latin Music Awards with a total of ten awards. Brazilian singer Roberto is given the Lifetime Achievement Award and Mexican-American musician Carlos Santana receives the Spirit of Hope.
- May 13 — Sirope by Alejandro Sanz becomes the best-selling album in Spain on its release week since 2006.
- August 28 — Donald Trump's comments about Mexican illegal immigrants result in a backlash from several Latin artists such as Ricky Martin, Marc Anthony, and Paulina Rubio.
- September 1 — "El Perdón" by Nicky Jam and Enrique Iglesias surpasses "La Tortura" by Shakira and Alejandro Sanz as the second-longest number one song on the Billboard Hot Latin Songs chart.
- September 9 – Puerto Rican singer Víctor Manuelle becomes the artist with the most number-one songs on the Billboard Tropical Songs chart with 26 songs.
- September 11 — Abraham Quintanilla, Jr., father of Tejano singer Selena, released a previously unreleased song after 20 years of the singer's death.
- September 15 — Sony Music announces its deal with Cuban record label EGREM to distribute recordings internationally which date back to the 1960s.
- September 17 — Emilio Estefan, Myriam Hernandez, Gustavo Santaolalla, Alvaro Torres, Hector Ochoa Cardenas, and Diego Torres are inducted into the Latin Songwriters Hall of Fame.
- September 24 – Mexican singer-songwriter Carla Morrison becomes the first female soloist in 22 weeks to enter the top 10 of Billboard Latin Digital Songs chart.
- September 27
  - Mexican singer and reality star Larry Hernandez is arrested in Ontario, Canada, on suspicion of kidnapping, assault and assault and battery causing injury.
  - Colombian singer Shakira performed "Imagine" for Pope Francis at the United Nations. In her role as a UNICEF Goodwill Ambassador, she also urged UNICEF to devote greater efforts toward early child development.
- September 28 – Tejano singer Arnold Martinez sues Freddie Records for $3,000 of unpaid royalties in a Houston courtroom.
- October 8 – The inaugural Latin American Music Awards are held at the Dolby Theatre in Los Angeles, California. Enrique Iglesias is the most awarded artist with five wins including Artist of the Year.
- October 26 – Colombian singer J Balvin became the first artist to receive the Latin Digital Diamond award from the Recording Industry Association of America denoting digital sales of 600,000 units for his songs "6 AM" and "Ay Vamos".
- November 9 – After eight years since they separated, Noel Schajris and Leonel Garcia announced they will reunite as Sin Bandera and release one more album together.
- November 18 – Roberto Carlos is honored by the Latin Academy of Recording Arts & Sciences as the Person of the Year.
- November 19
  - 16th Annual Latin Grammy Awards
    - "Hasta la Raíz" by Natalia Lafourcade wins Song of the Year and Record of the Year.
    - Todo Tiene Su Hora performed by Juan Luis Guerra wins Album of the Year.
    - Monsieur Periné wins Best New Artist.
- December 9 – Romeo Santos is named Top Latin Artist of the year by Billboard magazine.
- December 12 – Reggaeton singer Yandel becomes the first Latin artist to live stream a concert on the music service Tidal.

== Bands formed ==
- Cidade Dormitório (Brazil)
- CNCO (Latin pop)
- Ezetaerre (Spain)
- Joana Marte (Brazil)

== Number-ones albums and singles by country ==
- List of Hot 100 number-one singles of 2015 (Brazil)
- List of number-one songs of 2015 (Colombia)
- List of number-one albums of 2015 (Mexico)
- List of number-one albums of 2015 (Portugal)
- List of number-one albums of 2015 (Spain)
- List of number-one singles of 2015 (Spain)
- List of number-one Billboard Latin Albums from the 2010s § 2015
- List of number-one Billboard Hot Latin Songs of 2015
- List of number-one singles of 2015 (Venezuela)

== Awards ==
- 2015 Premio Lo Nuestro
- 2015 Billboard Latin Music Awards
- 2015 Latin American Music Awards
- 2015 Latin Grammy Awards
- 2015 Tejano Music Awards

== Albums released ==
=== First-quarter ===
==== January ====
Day	Title	Artist	Genre(s)	Singles	Label
8	Da Eternidade	Fernanda Brum	Gospel		MK Music
8	Con la Rienda Suelta	Ramones de Nuevo León			
20	Necesito un Bolero	Gilberto Santa Rosa	Salsa	"Por Como Van las Cosas" "Tequila y Canción" "Como Nunca Nadie" "Si Te Has Enamorado" "A Dónde Vamos a Parar" "La Primera Vez" "Apaga la Luz" "Este Amor"	Sony Music
26	Brazilian Nights	Kenny G	Smooth Jazz	"Corcovado (Quiet Nights of Quiet Stars)" "Brazilian Nights" "Summer Love"	Concord Records
27	xx 20 Aniversario	Intocable			Universal Music Latin Entertainment
27	Mi Estilo de Vida	Saul "El Jaguar" Alarcon			Fonovisa
27	Live: Desde Monterrey, Vol. 2	Bronco			
27	El Día Que Vuelva	Jorge Villamizar	Merengue, salsa, Latin pop		Sony Music Latin
27	Ruperto Chapí: String Quartets Nos. 1 & 2	Cuarteto Latinoamericano			
30	Por Siempre	Américo			Viva Music, Minga Records

==== February ====
Day	Title	Artist	Genre(s)	Singles	Label
3	El Que Sabe, Sabe	Tego Calderón	Reggaeton	"No More Mr. Nice Guy" "Dando Break" "El Que Sabe, Sabe"	Jiggiri Records, Siente Music, Cisneros, Universal Music Latin Entertainment
3	Legacy: De Líder a Leyenda Tour	Yandel		"Hablé de Tí" "Te Suelto El Pelo" "Junto al Amanecer" "Para Irnos (A Fuego)" "Passion Whine" "Moviendo Caderas" "En La Oscuridad [Versión Salsa]" "Duro Hasta Abajo" "Plakito [Remix]"	Sony Music Latin
3	Ojos en Blanco	La Arrolladora Banda El Limón de René Camacho	Cumbia, ranchera	"Lo Hiciste Otra Vez" "Ojos en Blanco" "Hecho en Sinaloa" "Ya Te Perdí La Fe" "Me Complementas" "Confesión"	Disa, Universal Music Latin Entertainment
3	Vendetta: The Project	Ivy Queen	Reggaeton, bachata, salsa	"Se Me Vuelve a Olvidar" "Imborrable" "Nací Para Amarte" "Vamos a Guerrear" "Vendetta" "Lo Vamos a Danzar" "I Don't Know"	Siente Music, Filtro Group, Universal Music Latin Entertainment, Ivy Queen Musa Sound Corp
3	ConSentido	María Toledo	Flamenco		Warner Music Spain
3	Jazzeando	Eddie Fernández			
3	Yazaira	Yazaira			
5	Tributo Al Mas Grande Chalino Sanchez, Vol. 2	Los Buitres de Culiacan Sinaloa			
9	Ayer y Hoy	Ivan "Melón" Lewis	Latin jazz, Cubano		Cezanne Producciones
10	A Quien Quiera Escuchar	Ricky Martin	Ballad, tribal house, soft rock, Latin, merengue	"Adiós" "Disparo al Corazón" "Isla Bella" "Náufrago" "La Mordidita" "Mátame Otra Vez" "A Quien Quiera Escuchar"	Sony Music Latin
10	Los Dúo	Juan Gabriel	Bolero, ballad, vocal	"Querida" "Se Me Olvidó Orta Vez" "La Diferencia" "Si Quieres" "Caray" "Te Lo Pido Por Favor" "Pero Qué Necesidad" "Vienes O Voy"	Fonovisa Records
10	Ínedito	Emmanuel	Ballad		Universal Music Latino
17	Zapateando	Los Cojolites	Conjunto, Ranchera, Son		Round Whirled Records
22	Posso Tudo Nele	Jane Gomes			
26	De la Cuna a la Jungla	Rockcito			

==== March ====
Day	Title	Artist	Genre(s)	Singles	Label
2	500 Noches para una Crisis	Joaquín Sabina			Sony Music
3	Sentimientos	Solido			
3	Otro Golpe	Javier Rosas y Su Artilleria Pesada			Fonovisa Records
3	Tatuaje	Elvis Crespo	Merengue, hip-house, bachata, reggaeton, salsa		Flash Music, Vene Music, Universal Music Latin Entertainment
4	Suite Caminos	Gonzalo Rubalcaba			
6	Como En El Cielo	Miel San Marcos	Alternative rock		
10	A Ver Que Opinan	Traviezoz de la Zierra			
10	Vivir Es Hoy	Soledad	Vocal, folk		Sony Music Entertainment (Argentina) S.A., Columbia
14	Homenaje a Astor Piazzolla	La Orquesta del Tango de Buenos Aires			
15	Made in Brasil	Eliane Elias	Samba, bossa nova	"Águas de Março [Waters of March]" "Incendiando" "Driving Ambition"	Concord Jazz
16	Amizade Sincera II	Renato Teixeira and Sérgio Reis	Caipira, sertanejo		Som Livre
16	Os Anjos Cantam	Jorge & Mateus	Sertanejo		Som Livre, Audiomix Records
16	Serviço Ocasional – Ao Vivo No Coliseu Do Porto	Os Azeitonas			Parlophone
17	Creo en Mi	Natalia Jiménez	Ranchera, Europop, vocal, ballad	"Creo en Mi" "Tú No Me Quieres Más" "Angeles Caídos" "Te Esperaré" "Tú y Yo"	Sony Music Latin, Sony Music Entertainment US Latin LLC
17	Los Reyes del Rap	Los G4, Ñengo Flow	Gangsta		Real GF Life, Inc
17	Hasta la Raíz	Natalia Lafourcade	Folk	"Hasta La Raíz" "Para Qué Sufrir" "Vámonos Negrito" "No Más Llorar"	Sony Music Latin
17	B	Diamante Eléctrico			not on label
17	Corazones	Mikel Erentxun	Pop rock		Warner Music Spain
17	Sonetos Y Poemas Para La Libertad	Miguel Poveda	Flamenco		Universal Music Group, DiscMedi Blau
19	Este Instante	Marta Gómez			Aluna
20	Deus no Esconderijo do Verso	Fabio De Melo	Religious		Sony Music
21	La Venganza	Cuca	Hard rock		Fonarte Latino
23	Espelho	Diogo Piçarra	Pop rock, vocal		Universal Music Portugal
24	El Aferrado	Julion Alvarez Y Su Norteno Banda	Norteño		Fonovisa, Universal Music Latin Entertainment
24	Corridos y Canciones de Mi Tierra	Los Rieleros del Norte	Norteño, ranchera		MAMP Songs, Sony Music Latin
24	Shaila Dúrcal	Shaila Dúrcal	Vocal, ballad		Capitol Latin, Universal Music Latin Entertainment
24	Historias Tattooadas	Macaco	Reggae-pop, conscious		Sony Music Latin
24	#PresenteContinuo	Guaco	Latin jazz, bolero		Sony Music
24	Corridos de Caballos Pura Sangre	Los Herederos de Nuevo León			
24	América, Brazil	Ivan Lins	MPB		Sony Music
24	Lost and Found	Buena Vista Social Club	Afro-Cuban jazz, Afro-Cuban, danzón, son	"Bruca Manigua" "Tiene Sabor" "Pedacito De Papel" "Lágrimas Negras"	World Circuit
26	El Ídolo de Tejas	Ruben Ramos and the Mexican Revolution			
27	Músicas Para Churrasco II	Seu Jorge	MPB		Cafuné, Universal Music
30	Y/O	Charliepapa			not on label (Charliepapa Self-Released)
30	Moctezuma	Porter			LOV/RECS
31	Healer	Alex Cuba			Caracol Records

=== Second-quarter ===
==== April ====
Day	Title	Artist	Genre(s)	Singles	Label
3	I Make You Want to Move	José Valentino Ruiz and the Latin Jazz Ensemble featuring Giovanni Hidalgo			
6	Andando	Joselito Acedo	Flamenco		Karonte Distribuciones
6	Não Vou Desistir	Wilian Nascimento			
7	Balas y Chocolate	Lila Downs	Folk	"Humito De Copal" "Mano Negra" "La Farsante" "La Patria Madrina" "La Promesa" "Viene La Muerte Echando Rasero"	Sony Music Latin
7	É	Duda Brack	Indie rock		not on label
7	La Melodia de La Calle, 3rd Season	Tony Dize	Reggaeton		Sony Music Latin, Pina Records
7	Segurito Segurito	La Septima Banda	Ranchera, Tejano		Fonovisa Records, Universal Music Latin Entertainment
8	¡Uno, Dos, Tres Andrés! En Español Y En Inglés	123 Andrés			
14	Unity: The Latin Tribute to Michael Jackson	Tony Succar	Salsa		Universal Music Classics, Universal Music Latin Entertainment
17	Dancê	Tulipa Ruiz			Pommelo Distribuições
21	Cama Incendiada	Maná	Pop rock, soft rock, alternative rock	"Adicto A Tu Amor" "La Cama Incendiada" "Ironía" "Mi Verdad" "Suavecito" "Somos Más Americanos"	Warner Music Latina
21	Que Suenen los Tambores	Víctor Manuelle		"Agua Bendita" "Sal A Bailar" "Isabela" "La Vida Perfecta" "Que Suenen los Tambores"	Sony Music Latin
22	Ser Humano	Zeca Pagodinho	Samba		Universal Music
28	Esto es Jesus Culture	Jesus Culture	Religious		Jesus Culture Music
28	Mil y una noches	Gemeliers			Pep's Records, Pep's Records
28	Acaríciame El Corazón	Pedro Fernández			
28	Tributo al Amor y Dolor	Alazzan			
28	Blam! Blam!	Jonas Sá	Experimental, chanson		Coqueiro Verde
28	Carbono	Lenine	MPB		Universal Music
30	Y Lo Dejamos Venir	Andrea Álvarez	Garage rock		not on label (Andrea Álvarez Self-Released)

==== May ====
Day	Title	Artist	Genre(s)	Singles	Label
4	Sirope	Alejandro Sanz	Ballad	"A Mí No Me Importa" "Pero Tú" "Un Zombie a la Intemperie" "Suena La Pelota"	Universal Music Latino
4	Infinito presente	Camané	Fado		Parlophone, Warner Music Portugal
6	El Mismo	ChocQuibTown			Sony Music
9	Por Cielo Y Tierra	Michael Salgado			
9	Mil Cuidades	Andrés Cepeda			
12	Perfecto	Eros Ramazzotti			Universal Music Group, Universal Music
12	Hola Mundo	Tan Biónica	Pop rock		Universal Music Argentina S.A., Universal Music Group
12	Negroni Piano +9	José Negroni			
14	Historia Del Tango – History Of Tango	Berta Rojas and Camerata Bariloche			
15	For Babies	Chino & Nacho	Reggaeton		Sonografica
15	Impromptu	Rodriguez Brothers	Jazz fusion, post bop, Latin jazz		Criss Cross Jazz
18	Buen Camino	Lucas Arnau	Bolero, ballad, Latin pop		Arnau Música
18	Guelã	Maria Gadú	Trip hop		Slap
18	Ritual	Fernando Otero			
19	Hoy Más Fuerte	Gerardo Ortíz	Tejano, norteño	"Fuego Cruzado" "El Cholo" "Millones de Besos" "Contigo" "Tony"	DEL Records, Sony Music Latin
19	Bogotá – Buenos Aires	Quinteto Leopoldo Federico			
19	Mujer Frente a la Cruz	Son by Four			
21	Esperanza mía	Lali Espósito	Soundtrack		Ariola, Sony Music
21	Son de Panamá	Rubén Blades	Salsa		Ruben Blades Publishing
25	Irmãos: Ao Vivo	Victor & Leo	Country, folk rock, vocal		Vidisco, Som Livre
26	Vete Acostumbrando	Larry Hernandez			Fonovisa Records
26	#	Los Huracanes del Norte			
26	Astrid Asher	Astrid Asher			
26	Tributo a Los Compadres – No Quiero Llanto	José Alberto "El Canario" and Septeto Santiaguero	Son, charanga, Afro-Cuban		Los Canarios Music
28	Derroche de Amor	Alex Campos			

==== June ====
Day	Title	Artist	Genre(s)	Singles	Label
1	Tema	Antonio Adolfo	Bossa nova, Latin jazz, MPB		AAM Music
2	Ahora	Chiquis Rivera	Banda		Sony Music
2	Una Nueva Historia	Charlie Aponte	Salsa, bolero		Top Stop Music
2	Uma Questão de Princípio	D.A.M.A.	Ballad, vocal		Sony Music
2	Veneno	Duelo			
2	Amanecer	Bomba Estéreo	Electro, cumbia		Sony Music Latin
2	Geminis	Karlos Rosé		"Infiel" "Niña de Mi Corazón" "Mi Lugar es Contigo"	
4	#Libre	Gian Marco	Ballad		e35, The Town Management
8	Eduardo Gudin & Notícias Dum Brasil 4	Eduardo Gudin	MPB, Samba		Dabliú Discos
9	Lo que aletea en nuestras cabezas	Robe			El Dromedario Records
11	Amame Como Soy (Nuevas Joyas)	Niña Pastori	Rumba, flamenco		Sony Music
16	The Last Don II	Don Omar	Reggaeton	"Guaya Guaya" "Soledad" "Perdido En Tus Ojos" "Te Recordaré Bailando"	Machete Music
16	Protegiendo el Penacho	Kinto Sol			Virus Enterprises
16	Caja de Musica	Monsieur Periné	Swing, gypsy jazz, electro swing		Flowfish Records
16	Soy	Ulises Bueno			Segundo A, RCA, Sony Music
23	Reuniendo Corazones	La Reunion Nortena	Norteño		Azteca Records, Fonovisa Records, Universal Music Latin Entertainment
23	Radio Universo	Chino & Nacho	Reggaeton, Merengue		Sonografica
23	Nada Es Demasiado	Mojito Lite			Bad Music, Tokao Music
23	Lloviendo Estrellas	Leslie Grace	Salsa, Bachata	"Como Duele El Silencio"	Sony Music Latin
23	El Alma del Son (Tributo a Matamoros)	Alain Pérez Septeto Tradicional	Son		Warner Music Spain, Cargo Music, Peermusic
23	Pa' Que Sientas Lo Que Siento	Aida Cuevas			
23	Los Animales	Mister G			
23	Despierta	Arianna Puello			Warner Music Spain, Zona Bruta, En Tu Cuello Records
25	Dois Amigos, Um Século de Música / Multishow Ao Vivo	Caetano Veloso and Gilberto Gil	MPB, Bossanova		Sony Music
25	Presents Mamblue	Dr. Ed Calle	Latin jazz		Mojito Records
26	Locos Por el Son	Sonlokos			
30	Mi Vicio Más Grande	Banda el Recodo	Cumbia, ranchera		Fonovisa Records, Universal Music Latin Entertainment
30	Ya No Vives en Mi	Banda Clave Nueva De Max Peraza			
30	Adelante	Lucky Díaz and the Family Jam Band			Rainy Day Dimes

=== Third-quarter ===
==== July ====
Day	Title	Artist	Genre(s)	Singles	Label
7	Detrás del Miedo	El Komander			
7	Intercambio	Wayne Wallace Latin Jazz Quarter			
7	Roberto Carlos em Las Vegas	Roberto Carlos	Bossa nova, MPB, Soul, rock & roll		Sony Music
7	Mucho Mas Que Amor	Ram Herrera	Tejano		VMB Music Group
7	Fados do Fado	Marco Rodrigues	Fado		Universal, Mercury
7	Deseo Tu Gloria	Emir Sensini			
10	Intensamente con Canciones de Juan Gabriel	La India		"Ahora Que Te Vas" "Dímelo" "Me Voy a Acostumbrar"	
10	La Historia De La Musica Tejana	The Legends			
10	Troco Likes	Tiago Iorc	MPB		Slap
17	Dale	Pitbull	Reggaeton, pop rap, electro		Sony Music Latin, Mr. 305
17	Tradición, Arte y Passión	Mariachi Los Camperos De Nati Cano			
19	Biblia Ovni	Massacre			Discos Popart
21	8	Caramelos de Cianuro	Pop rock		Pepsi
24	Cuando Llora la Milonga	Nicolás Ledezma y su Orquesta			
24	En La Sala Con El Joe	Toño Restrepo			
29	El Viaje	Antonio José			Universal Music Group
31	Se Baila Se Canta	La Barra			RCA, Sony Music
31	Graça Quase Acústico {rs}	Paulo César Baruk			
31	Johnny Sky	Johnny Sky		"With or Without You" "Quiereme"	

==== August ====
Day	Title	Artist	Genre(s)	Singles	Label
2	Estaciones	Rey Ruiz	Salsa		Luna Negra Productions, Inc.
7	Más + Corazón Profundo Tour: En Vivo Desde la Bahía de Santa Marta	Carlos Vives			
7	En Esto Creo	Hillsong en Español	Gospel		Hillsong Music Australia, CanZion
7	#TuMano	Luciano Pereyra	Ballad		Universal Music Group
7	Sobre Crianças, Quadris, Pesadelos e Lições de Casa...	Emicida	Pop rap, conscious		Lab Fantasma, Sony Music
7	Like Nice	Celso Fonseca	MPB		Universal Music
11	Imaginário	John Finbury			
11	Dilúvio	Dani Black	MPB		not on label (Dani Black Self-Released)
11	Orion	Musicologo y Menes	Reggaeton	"Tumba La Casa"	Nazza Records, Rimas Entertainment
13	Alex Sampedro	Alex Sampedro			
14	Algo Sucede	Julieta Venegas	Ranchera, Pop rock, soft rock, Latin pop		Sony Music Latin
14	Trulaynadamas	Tru-la-lá			RCA, Sony Music
14	Éter	Scalene	Alternative rock		Som Livre
21	El Amor	Gloria Trevi	Dance-Pop, Ballad, soft rock, house		Universal Music Latino
21	Los Cotizados	Baby Rasta & Gringo	Reggaeton		Ganda Entertainment, Sony Music Latin
21	En Vivo	Kabah and OV7			
21	Mon Laferte Vol.1	Mon Laferte	Alternative rock		Discos Valiente, Los Manejadores, Universal Music Group
21	Cuba: The Conversation Continues	Arturo O'Farrill and The Afro Latin Jazz Orchestra	Latin jazz, Big Band		Motema
22	Imparables	El Gran Martín Elías and Rolando Ochoa			
28	Biber: Baroque Splendor – Missa Salisburgensis	Jordi Savall	Baroque	"Motet" "[] – Allegro – Allegro – Presto" "Credo"	Alia Vox
28	En Vivo: Guadalajara – Monterrey	Banda Sinaloense MS de Sergio Lizarraga	Banda		Lizos Music
28	#Hashtag Y Lo Más Trending	La Tierra Cali			
28	Locura Total	Fito Páez and Moska			RCA, Sony Music
28	Nheengatu ao Vivo	Titãs	Rock & roll		Som Livre
28	Caótica Belleza	Esteman	Indie pop		Universal Music México, S.A. De C.V.
28	En Dos Idiomas	Tito Nieves		"Si Me Tenías"	Select-O-Hits
31	Leve Embora	Thiago Ramil	Folk, indie pop		Escápula Records
31	El Mundo y Los Amantes Inocentes	Pablo López			Universal Music Group

==== September ====
Day	Title	Artist	Genre(s)	Singles	Label
4	Los Vaqueros: La Trilogía	Wisin	Reggaeton	"Nota de Amor"	Sony Music Latin
4	El Rompecabezas	La Energia Nortena	Norteño		Fonovisa Records, Azteca Records, Universal Music Latin Entertainment
4	Eterno: Live	Christine D'Clario	Ballad		Integrity Music
11	Quién me ha visto...	Rozalén			Sony Music, Surclub Desarrollo Artistico
11	A + No Poder	Alejandra Guzmán	Pop rock	"Adiós" "Que Ironía"	Sony Music Latin
11	Jobim Jazz (Ao Vivo)	Mario Adnet			Biscoito Fino
11	Leo Brouwer: Music For Two Guitars	Leo Brouwer	Contemporary		Naxos
12	Esa Morena	Daiquiri	Afro-Cuban, Salsa		Personal Music
18	Volvieron Los Rastrilleros	J King y Maximan	Reggaeton	"Hace Calor"	Cinq Music Group
25	Ya Dime Adios	La Maquinaria Norteña	Norteño		Azteca Records, Fonovisa Records, Universal Music Latin Entertainment
25	México	Julio Iglesias	Ballad		Sony Music Latin
25	Matando la Liga	Jory Boy	Reggaeton	"Por Que Cambiar"	Young Boss Entertainment
25	Sanremo Grande Amore	Il Volo	Vocal		Sony Music Latin
25	Nuevo Orden Mundial	Malón	Thrash, Heavy Metal		Sony Music, Discos Popart
24	Reaprender (EP Acustico)	Adelso Freire	Gospel		Paulinas COMEP, Paulinas COMEP
25	Justo Ahora y Siempre	Dvicio	Pop rock		Sony Music Latin
30	Mondongo	La Cuneta Son Machin			

=== Fourth-quarter ===
==== October ====
Day	Title	Artist	Genre(s)	Singles	Label
2	La Vida del Rey	Enigma Norteno	Norteño, ranchera, Tejano		Fonovisa Records, Universal Music Latin Entertainment
2	Conexión	Fonseca		"Entre Mi Vida y la Tuya"	Sony Music Latin
2	Homenaje (A La Música De Diomedes Díaz)	Fonseca			
2	Rumba a los desconocidos	Estopa			
2	35 Aniversario	Grupo Niche	Salsa		PPM
2	Todo Caminho É Sorte	Roberta Campos	MPB		Polysom, Deck
2	A Mulher Do Fim Do Mundo	Elza Soares	Samba, MPB		Circus
3	Pretty Boy, Dirty Boy	Maluma	Reggaeton, mambo		Sony Music Latin
3	1,2,3 Llega Navidad	ClaraLuna			
9	Cambio de Piel	Bebe			Parlophone
9	Mundo	Mariza	Fado		Nonesuch
9	Muriendo de Amor	Vicente Fernández	Ranchera		Sony Music Latin
9	Hombre de Trabajo	Banda Carnaval	Ranchera, norteño		Disa, Andaluz Music, Universal Music Latin Entertainment
9	El Concierto	Fiel a la Vega			
9	Buena Vida	Diego Torres			Sony Music Latin
9	Delírio	Roberta Sá	MPB		Som Livre
10	El Hilo Invisible (Cantos Sefaradíes)	Cuarteto Latinoamericano			
13	Derivacivilização	Ian Ramil			Escápula Records
15	Impredecible	Bareto	Dub		World Village
16	Tomen Nota	Adriel Favela			Gerencia 360 Music, Inc.
16	Roses & Wine	Randy "Nota Loka"			
16	Futuro Eu	David Fonseca	Pop rock		Rastilho Records
16	Vivir Sin Miedo	Buika	Flamenco, vocal, fusion		DRO, EastWest
16	Merengue y Sentimiento	Héctor Acosta "el Torito"	Merengue, Bachata		D.A.M. Production Inc.
16	Tem Mineira No Samba	Corina Magalhães			
16	Amanhecer	Paula Fernandes	MPB		Universal Music
19	Tribute to Irakere: Live in Marciac	Chucho Valdés	Latin jazz		Jazz Village
23	Visionary	Farruko	Reggaeton		Sony Music Latin
23	Por Amor a Morelia Michoacán	Marco Antonio Solís			Fonovisa Records
23	Cinema: Edicion En Espanol	Andrea Bocelli	Classical, impressionist, neo-classical, romantic, soundtrack, contemporary		Universal Music Latino, Almud, Sugar
23	Renacer	Christian Daniel	Ballad	"Me Vuelvo un Cobarde"	Select Hits Est.
23	Directo	Vanesa Martin			Warner Music Spain
23	Entre 20 Aguas A La Música De Paco de Lucía	Various artists			
23	Dá-me um segundo	D.A.M.A.	Ballad, vocal		Sony Music
27	Pa' Tío Simón	Rafael Pollo Brito	Folk, Cuatro, Música Criolla		not on label
30	Sin Presumir	Los Invasores de Nuevo León	Norteño		Sony Music
30	8.11.14	Zoé			
30	Paradojas	Las Pastillas del Abuelo	Alternative rock, classic rock		Discos Crack, Sony Music
30	Bailar el viento	Manuel Carrasco			Universal Music Group
30	Manuel Madrano	Manuel Madrano			
30	... Tangamente	Omar Mollo			
30	Manual Ou Guia Livre De Dissolução Dos Sonhos	Boogarins	Psychedelic rock		Other Music Recording Co.
30	Na Veia	Rogê & Arlindo Cruz	Samba		Warner Music Brasil
30	Prender el Alma	Nicola Cruz	Cumbia, downtempo, house, leftfield		ZZK Records
Unknown date	Project Black Pantera	Project Black Pantera	Punk, Groove Metal, Thrash, Hardcore		not on label

==== November ====
Day	Title	Artist	Genre(s)	Singles	Label
4	Juntos Por la Cumbia	Los Angeles Azules y Grupo Cañaveral de Humberto Pabon			
6	Dangerous	Yandel	Reggaeton, Synth-Pop		Sony Music Latin
6	Hablemos	Ariel Camacho y los Plebes del Rancho	Ranchera, Corrido		DEL Records
6	Amor Supremo	Carla Morrison	Ballad, vocal		Cosmica Records
6	Mi Princesa	Remmy Valenzuela			Fonovisa Records, Universal Music Group
6	Tour Terral: Tres Noches En Las Ventas	Pablo Alborán	Acoustic, ballad, soft rock, flamenco		Warner Music Latina, Parlophone
6	Seguimos la Fiesta	Banda Tierra Sagrada			
6	Amor & Pasión	Il Divo	Vocal, ballad, neo-classical, neo-romantic, contemporary		Syco Music, Columbia
6	Similares	Laura Pausini	Chanson		Warner Music Latina
6	Tierra Nueva	Cielo Razzo			Tocka Discos, Sony Music
6	Universos Paralelos	Jotdog	Synth-Pop		Promotodo México, S.A. De C.V.
6	Meteoros	Meteoros			Ariola, Sony Music
6	Todavía	Francisco Céspedes			Warner Music Mexico
6	Ámame Como Soy (Nuevas Joyas)	Niña Pastori	Rumba, flamenco		Sony Music
6	Sambas Para Mangueira	Various artists			
6	Vidas Pra Contar	Djavan	MPB		Sony Music, Luanda Records
7	La Fantasia: Homenaje a Juan Formell	Formell Y Los Van Van	Cubano		Egrem, Sony Music, Legacy
9	6	Yuridia			Sony Music Latin
11	Primavera	Nahuel Pennisi			Ariola, Sony Music
13	Mi Mejor Regalo	Charlie Zaa			Sony Music Latin
13	Cuba y Puerto Rico Son	Various artists			
13	Diferente	Roberto Tapia			Fonovisa Records
16	Todo Comenzó Bailando	Marama			Montevideo Music Group
20	Historias de la Calle	Calibre 50	Ranchera, norteño		Sony Music Latin, Andaluz Music
23	Directo En El Círculo Flamenco De Madrid	Antonio Reyes and Diego Del Morao			
24	Mi Guitarra y Yo, Vol. 2	Regular Caro			
27	MTV Unplugged: El Libro de Las Mutaciones	Bunbury			Warner Music Spain, Ocesa
27	Sirope Vivo	Alejandro Sanz	Ballad		Universal Music Group
27	Caos	Malú			Sony Music
27	Adivinha	Lucas Lucco	Country		Sony Music
27	Baile Do Teló	Michel Teló	Ballad, Country, MPB		Radar Records, Brothers

==== December ====
Day	Title	Artist	Genre(s)	Singles	Label
3	El Malquerido: Original Motion Picture Soundtrack	Jesús "Chino" Miranda	Bolero, danzón, merengue, pachanga, ranchera		Sonografica
4	Un Besito Más	Jesse & Joy	Ballad	"No Soy una de Esas"	Warner Music Mexico
4	Desde el Azteca	Los Tigres del Norte	Norteño, cumbia		Fonovisa Records, Universal Music Latin Entertainment
4	Casi Justicia Social	Don Osvaldo	Rock & roll, blues rock		Sony Music
4	Tengo Ganas de Ser Fiel	Banda Troyana			
4	Distante Em Algum Lugar	Versalle	Alternative rock, indie rock		Slap
11	Los Dúo, Vol. 2	Juan Gabriel			
11	Los Amigo	Luis Alberto Spinetta	Art rock, soft rock		Sony Music
11	A Luneta E Tempo, Trilha Sonora Original De Alceu Valença	Alceu Valença	MPB		Deck
11	Cordas, Gonzaga e Afins	Elba Ramalho	Forró		Coquiero Verde
11	AR	Almir Sater and Renato Teixeira	Folk, MPB		Universal Music
18	No Forró Do Seu Rosil	Lucy Alves and Clã Brasil	Forró		Biscoito Fino

=== Unknown ===
Title	Artist	Genre(s)	Singles	Label
Un amor pendiente	Cardencheros de Sapioriz			Ropeadope Sur
Mala madre	Camila Moreno	Trip hop, indie pop, experimental		not on label

== Best-selling records ==
=== Best-selling albums ===
The following is a list of the top 10 best-selling Latin albums in the United States in 2015, according to Billboard.

Rank	Album	Artist
1	Los Dúo	Juan Gabriel
2	Formula, Vol. 2	Romeo Santos
3	A Quien Quiera Escuchar	Ricky Martin
4	Cama Incendiada	Maná
5	Mis Número 1...40 Aniversario	Juan Gabriel
6	Hoy Más Fuerte	Gerardo Ortíz
7	Sex and Love	Enrique Iglesias
8	Las Bandas Romanticas de America 2015	Various artists
9	15 Inolvidables	Marco Antonio Solís
10	El Aferrado	Julión Álvarez y su Norteño Banda

=== Best-performing songs ===
The following is a list of the top 10 best-performing Latin songs in the United States in 2015, according to Billboard.

Rank	Single	Artist
1	"El Perdón"	Nicky Jam featuring Enrique Iglesias
2	"Propuesta Indecente"	Romeo Santos
3	"Hilito"	Romeo Santos
4	"Ay Vamos"	J Balvin
5	"Ginza"	J Balvin
6	"Te Metiste"	Ariel Camacho y Los Plebes del Rancho
7	"La Gozadera"	Gente de Zona featuring Marc Anthony
8	"Fanatica Sensual"	Plan B
9	"Háblame de Ti"	Banda Sinaloense MS de Sergio Lizárraga
10	"Bailando"	Enrique Iglesias featuring Gente De Zona and Descemer Bueno

== Deaths ==
- January 4 – Sharon la Hechicera, 40, Ecuadorian technocumbia singer
- January 13 – Lincoln Olivetti, 60, Brazilian musician, composer, and musical producer
- January 20 – Canserbero, 26, Venezuelan rapper (murdered by stabbing)
- February 5 – Celina Gonzalez, 85, Cuban singer
- February 12 – Sergio Blanco, 66, Spanish singer (Sergio y Estíbaliz).
- February 25 – Ariel Camacho, 22, Mexican singer (traffic collision)
- March 8 – Inezita Barroso, 90, Brazilian folk singer
- March 30 – Aniceto Molina, 75, Colombian cumbia musician
- April 5 – Claudio Prieto, 80, Spanish composer
- May 13 – Lucy Fabery, 84, Puerto Rican Latin jazz recording artist
- May 19 – Manuel Molina, 67, Spanish flamenco singer
- May 25 – Jorge Massias, 67, Mexican songwriter
- May 30 – Jaime Almeida, 65, Mexican journalist and musicologist
- June 12 – Fernando Brant, 68, Brazilian poet, lyricist and journalist
- June 6 – Jorge Galemire, 64, Uruguayan guitarist and composer
- June 12 – José Messias, 86, Brazilian musical producer
- June 14 – Hugo Blanco, 74, Venezuelan musician and composer ("Moliendo Café")
- June 23 – Marujita Díaz, 83, Spanish singer and actress, complications from colon cancer.
- June 24 – Cristiano Araújo, 29, Brazilian singer and songwriter (traffic collision)
- July 5 – Jorge Álvarez, 83, Argentine producer
- July 6 – Julio Ángel, 69, Puerto Rican trio, bolero, rock and pop singer
- July 10 – Rob Fernández, American concert promoter
- July 12 – Javier Krahe, 71, Spanish singer-songwriter, heart attack.
- July 13 – Joan Sebastian, 64, Mexican singer and songwriter, bone cancer.
- July 23:
  - Mexicano 777, 42, Puerto Rican rapper
  - Cirilo Vila, 77, Chilean pianist and composer
- July 26 – Pía Sebastiani, 90, Argentine pianist and composer
- August 5 – Raphy Leavitt, 66, Puerto Rican composer and orchestra leader, complications of surgery for artificial hip infection.
- August 21 – Daniel Rabinovich, 71, Argentine musician and comedian (Les Luthiers).
- August 28 – Steve Vibert Pouchie, American Latin jazz musician, arranger, and educator
- September 7 – Guillermo Rubalcaba, 88, Cuban pianist, bandleader, composer and orchestrator
- October 10 – Fernando Echavarría, 62, Dominican Republic singer and songwriter
- October 11 – Jorge Garbett, 60, Paraguayan singer and songwriter
- October 23 – Aldo Sarabia, 50, Mexican trumpeter
- October 22 – Gloria van Aerssen, 83, Spanish composer and singer (Vainica Doble
- October 25 – Gladys "Havana" Carbo, 80, Cuban jazz vocalist
- November 1 – Raul Rekow, 61, American drummer
- November 5 – Benny Sadel, 55, Dominican Republic merengue singer
- November 6 – José Ángel Espinoza, 96, Mexican singer, composer and actor.
- December 1 – Leoni Franco, 73, Uruguayan musician, composer and guitarist.
- December 19 – Selma Reis, 55, Brazilian actress and singer, brain cancer.
- December 25 – Manuel Agujetas, 76, Spanish flamenco singer.
- December 27 – Syko "El Terror", 33, Puerto Rican songwriter
