= The Jet Black's =

Rock Band

- Origin: Brazil
- Genres: Rock and Roll
- Occupation: Band
- Instruments: Guitar, bass, drums, saxophone and electric keyboard
- Years active: 1961–1971; 1982–1989; 1993–2003
- Labels: Continental Records, Som Livre
- Past members: Joe Primo; Bobby di Carlo; Carlos Vítor; José Paulo Metângulo; Jurandi Trindade; Ernesto Neto

The Jet Black's was an instrumental rock band from São Paulo, Brazil. The band was formed in 1961 (as "The Vampires") by Primo Moreschi - Joe Primo (guitar), Roberto Caldeira - Bobby de Carlo (guitar), José Paulo (guitar) Carlos Vítor (bass), Jurandi Trindade (drums), . Their first single was "Apache"/"Kon-Tiki", followed by "Hully-Gully" (1962), and "Twist/The Jet Black's Again" (1963).

Ernesto Neto - Nestico (saxophone) and José Provetti - Gatto (lead guitar), joined the group in 1963, Nestico left the group in 1964 and Gatto left the group in 1966, both future group RC-7. the other members became purely a house band for Continental Records.

== History ==
=== First years ===
The band was formed in São Paulo in 1961 by guitarist Joe Primo (Primo Moreschi) and guitarist Bobby de Carlo. Initially, its name was the vampires, in 1963, however, it was changed to the current one, in honor of the English group Shadows, one of whose biggest hits was the song "Jet Black". In addition to Shadows, the group's influence was also the American group Ventures. Both had as basic repertoire rocks and instrumental twists performed for balls.

In 1962, they signed with Chantecler and released their first album, a 78 rpm, on which they performed two covers by The Shadows: "Apache" and "Kon-Tiki". With the success of the debut, the label invested in the group with the release of two LPs. The first, released in the same year, was "Twist", and the second was recorded the following year, "The Jet Black's Again – Twist".

=== Success ===
Throughout the 1960s, it was one of the most requested bands for concerts and recordings by performers such as Celly Campelo, Ronnie Cord, Roberto Carlos, Sérgio Reis and other stars of the Jovem Guarda. It was one of the bands that had the most participation in the Jovem Guarda program. In 1965, they began to make vocal recordings and released the LP "The Jet Black's", which would highlight the re-recording of the American rock classic "Suzie Q", by Dale Hawkins. In the same year, they recorded what would be their biggest success: "Theme for Young Lovers", version for "Theme for Young Lovers", released in a single that also included "Suzie Q".

In 1968, the group recorded the album "O Quente" with singer Reginaldo Rossi. In the same year, the German guitarist went to the United States and the composer and arranger Osvaldo Luís Posi and the keyboardist Renato Mendes join the band. With this new line-up, The Jet Black's records the album "Sempre", this was the band's last studio album recorded in the 60s, which marked by leaving Rock and roll and going to Rock pop.

With the decline of the Jovem Guarda, at the end of the 1960s, the group went into crisis with various formations, always around Jurandi. In the 1970s, it fell into ostracism and ended its activities, only resumed at the beginning of the following decade, with the revitalization of rock in Brazil.

=== Band return ===
In 1982, the remnants of the group, Jurandi and Guilherme, signed with Som Livre and released the LP "Rides Again". from 1960. In 1998, Douglas Dotta, son of Guilherme, resumed the group's work. They participated in the celebrations referring to the 30 years of Jovem Guarda, re-recording "Apache" for the CD box "30 anos da Jovem Guarda", launched by PolyGram, in 1995.

In 2003, with a new lineup, the group released the album "The Jet Black's Instrumental", which would mark the group's new return to activities. However, on 13 July 2004, Jurandi Trindade – the only member who participated in all the formations – dies, and thus ends the legendary group's career.

== Bibliography ==
- 2011 – The jet Black's (By Edu Reis)

== Discography ==
=== Studio albums ===
- 1962 – Twist (Chantecler)
- 1963 – The Jet Black's Again (Chantecler)
- 1963 – Other Famous Twists (Chantecler)
- 1964 – Hully Gully (Chantecler)
- 1965 – Top Top Top (Chantecler)
- 1966 – The Jet Black's (Chantecler)
- 1967 – Temas de Sempre na Música Jovem (Chantecler)
- 1968 – Sempre (Chantecler)
- 1982 – Riders Again (Som Livre)
- 1988 – Remember The Shadows e The Ventures (Brasidisc)
- 1989 – Golden Hits of The 60s (Brasidisc)
- 1993 – The Jet Black's no Cinema
- 2003 – Instrumental

=== Compilation albums ===
- 1989 – O Melhor de The Jet Black's
- 1995 – 25 Sucessos de The Jet Black's
- 1996 – The Classic Collection
- 2002 – Disco de Ouro
- 2005 – Grandes Nomes

=== Special albums ===
- 1965 – A Rainha da Juventude (Meire Pavão and The Jet Black's)
- 1966 – Meire (Meire Pavão and The Jet Black's)
- 1966 – Juventude em Sucessos
- 1995 – 30 da Jovem Guarda

== Legacy ==
The Jet Black's is considered one of the most important bands in Brazilian rock, and the band that helped shape Rock pop in the country, being one of the most famous bands in Instrumental rock, the style in which the band began to be successful, in 1964 they started to bring songs with lyrics, influencing artists that were starting at the time. The band participated in several recordings, playing instrumental songs by various artists of the time, such as Roberto Carlos, Celly Campello, Ronnie Cord, Sérgio Reis, Meire Pavão and others.

== See also ==
- Jovem Guarda
