= Dick Danello =

Italian singer, recording artist, composer and actor

- Born: Filippo D'Anello; January 1, 1943; Belvedere Marittimo, Calabria, Italy
- Occupations: Singer, song-writer, producer, actor, radio DJ
- Musical career
- Genres: Rock; pop; adult contemporary
- Instruments: Electric and acoustic guitar
- Years active: 1964–present
- Labels: Odeon, Som Livre, Philips Records
- Website: www.dickdanello.com

Dick Danello, stage name of Filippo D'Anello (Belvedere Marittimo, January 1, 1943), is an Italian singer, songwriter, producer, MC and actor who lives in Brazil. He was part of the 1960s Brazilian rock scene known as Jovem Guarda.

== Biography ==
Filippo D'Anello was born in Belvedere Marittimo, city of Calabria, Italy. He started singing as a child in Convento dei Cappuccini just before immigrating to Brazil in 1955. He started his career as a professional singer in 1964, as Dick Danello, with the album "O Reino da Juventude" released by the popular São Paulo DJ Antonio Aguilar along with other acts like Sérgio Reis, The Vips, Marcos Roberto etc.

In 1965, he recorded an EP for Gravodisc, an independent label in Santos-SP, with the orchestra of Élcio Alvarez and the vocal group Eloá. Later in 65, he recorded a cover of Quando Vedrai La Mia Ragazza for Fermata Records, accompanied by The Jet Blacks and Os Titulares do Ritmo, which got to #10 in the charts.

Since then, he became a regular at Jovem Guarda a TV rock show compered by Roberto Carlos, who used to dub him "The italianissimo".

Still in 1965, Danello recorded Ogni Mattina, accompanied by The Jordans with arrangements by Pocho, a Uruguayan conductor who had his own combo; rights were bought by the BBC for broadcasting purposes in England.

In 1966, Danello covers Caterina Caselli's ''Nessuno mi può giudicare'' from the Festival di San Remo. In 1967, he covers Bisogna Saper Perdere originally performed by The Rokes and Lucio Dalla at San Remo. The single had arrangements by Edmundo Peruzzi backed with Il Mondo Non È Per Me, produced by Tony Campello.

In the early 70s, Danello took part in movies and musicals as actor and singer. In 1971 he wrote the soundtrack and appeared as an actor with Renato Aragão and Dedé Santana, A Ilha dos Paqueras, with the Fauzi Mansur's direction. He also composed the soundtrack and starred in the first film of renowned Brazilian director Carlos Reichenbach, Corrida em Busca do Amor.

He also participated in the rock opera Jesus Christ Superstar of the Andrew Lloyd Webber and Tim Rice as an actor and singer, when the play comes to Brazil. The direction was made by the Russian actor Eugenio Kusnet. Other actors in the play that have been revealed were Ney Latorraca, Eduardo Conde and Stênio Garcia. He composed soundtracks for over 30 movies and novelas, including the song Passion Love Theme, which was part of the novela Fogo Sobre Terra and was successful in the voice of several artists like Altemar Dutra, Moacyr Franco, Eduardo Assad, Joelma and many other singers. He also composed for the first film of Vera Fischer, Red Signal - As Fêmeas, with the band Magnetic Sounds.

Also in the 70s founded the Central Park Records, a record label which had great importance in the music production in the 70s, launching artists like Dave Maclean, Edward Cliff, Téo Azevedo, who was awarded the Latin Grammy in 2013, and many other regional and singers of the "False English" movement, that would mark the Brazilian music industry in the 70s. Dave Maclean sold over 1 million copies in Latin America and Edward Cliff conquered Europe with the hit Nights of September, composition of the Dick Danello, that becoming of the first places in Italy and playing in the English BBC.

In 1982 it began with the radio program Parlando D'Amore, who began to publish the popular Italian music in Brazilian territory. The program went through stations such as Radio Capital and Radio Gazeta, and winner of several prizes awarded by the municipal council of São Paulo as a recovery vehicle of foreign Italian culture and enriching the São Paulo culture as itself. The history of the program today is research topic of a group of academics of the social communication at USP.

In the 1980s launches Parlando D'Amore and L'Italiano albums, recorded in Milan and Rome and distributed in Brazil. Begin to show in the Rede Manchete annual editions of the Sanremo Music Festival, launching in Brazil Eros Ramazzotti, Laura Pausini, Amedeo Minghi, Andrea Bocelli and other artists today devoted worldwide.

In the 1990s continues with radio program and is hired by the Italian company Costa Crociere, to elaborate cruises with Italian themes along the Brazilian and South America coast. He made the musical research for various projects of Rede Globo, including for Terra Nostra novela, one of the biggest recent successes of Brazilian TV.

In 2004 he released the Cuore Italiano album and, in the same year, is awarded by the Brazilian Academy of Art, Culture and History for his artistic contribution to the country. In 2009 he released the album Nelcuorenellanima, recorded in studios in Milan, Udine and Florence, bringing an original songs and a duet with Italian singer Edoardo de Angelis. In 2013 release Rock Italiano album, that makes a tribute to the roaring years of Italian music.

In 2014 receives the Order of the Musicians of Brazil an award in honor of his 50-year career and goes on tour with the band The Clevers to commemorate the anniversary of the Jovem Guarda, singing on the Costa Favolosa cruise, Homs Club and in the Virada Cultural of São Paulo.

== Discography ==
=== Albums ===
- 1964 - O Reino da Juventude
- 1969 - Natal Feliz
- 1969 - As 14 Pr'a Frente vol. V
- 1969 - As 14 Pr'a Frente vol. VI
- 1970 - As 14 Pr'a Frente vol. VII
- 1975 - Nostalgia alla Italiana
- 1983 - Parlando d'amore
- 1988 - L'italiano
- 1990 - Parlando d'amore
- 1993 - Tuttosanremo I
- 1994 - Tuttosanremo II
- 1999 - 20 successi italiani
- 2004 - Cuore italiano
- 2009 - Nelcuorenellanima
- 2014 - Rock italiano
- 2015 - Temas da Boca do Lixo
- 2015 - Italian Highway
- 2016 - The Lost Sessions

=== Soundtracks ===
- 1970 - A Ilha dos Paqueras
- 1971 - Uma Verdadeira História de Amor
- 1972 - Sinal Vermelho - as Fêmeas
- 1972 - Corrida em Busca do Amor
- 1973 - Os Ossos do Barão
- 1974 - Gente que Transa
- 1974 - Fogo sobre Terra
- 1975 - Núpcias Vermelhas

=== EPs ===
- 1965 - Dick Danello
- 1969 - 4 Sucessos Nacionais
- 1969 - 4 Sucessos Internacionais
- 1971 - Passion Love Theme
- 1974 - Núpcias Vermelhas
- 1974 - 4 pezzi di successo
- 1975 - Angela's Love Theme

=== Singles ===
- 1965 - Quando vedrai la mia ragazza / Bussicabombaio
- 1965 - Ogni mattina / Non aspetto nessuno
- 1966 - Nessuno mi può giudicare / Parlami di te
- 1967 - Bisogna saper perdere / Il mondo non è per me
- 1968 - Poesia / Da bambino
- 1969 - Zingara / Lontano dagli occhi
- 1969 - Leylan / Já Não Existe Mais
- 1970 - Chi non lavora non fa l'amore / La prima cosa bella
- 1971 - Il cuore è uno zingaro / Poetica no. 1
- 2017 - Santo Natale
- 2018 - Un Altro Giorno Senza Te

== Actor (partial filmography) ==
- 1970 - A Ilha dos Paqueras
- 1972 - Sinal Vermelho - as Fêmeas
- 1972 - Corrida em Busca do Amor

== Awards ==
- 1985 - Assembleia Legislativa de São Paulo
- 1986 - Premio Tanit (Spain)
- 2004 - Academia Brasileira de Arte, Cultura e História
- 2014 - Ordem dos Músicos do Brasil
