= Toada de boi =

Type of central Amazonian folk music

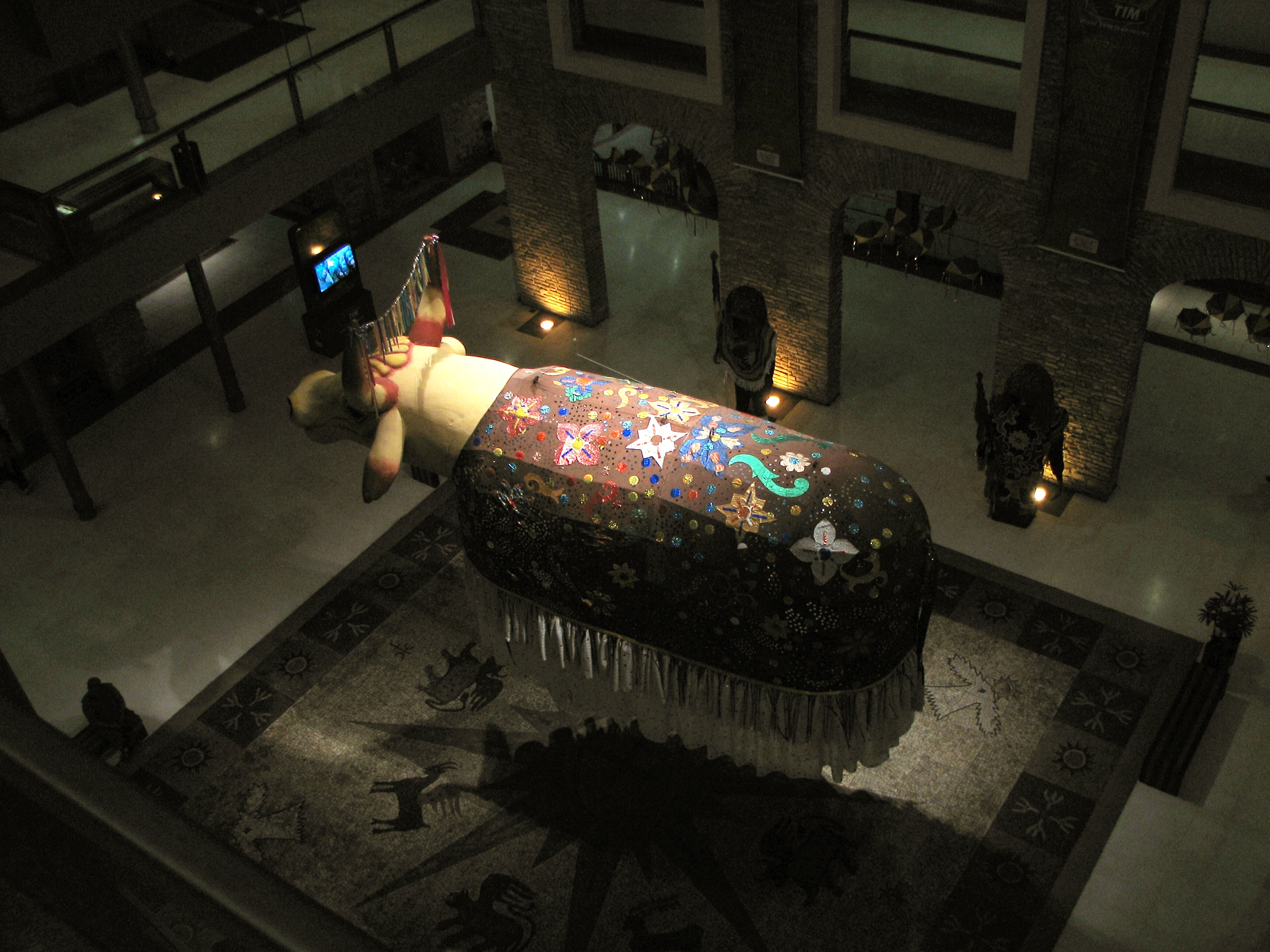
Big Bumba-meu-boi in the Paço Alfândega cultural center and mall, Recife

Toada de boi, also Toada de boi-bumbá, is a style of central Amazonian folk music that has moved into the mainstream in Brazil. It is a combination of traditional Amazonian rhythms with Amazonian Indigenous and African influence. The genre was popularized throughout Brazil and in Europe after Amazonian group Carrapicho's hit "Tic Tic Tac".

== See also ==
- Bumba Meu Boi
