= Zezinho Corrêa =

Brazilian singer (1951–2021)

- Born: José Maria Nunes Corrêa; 21 May 1951; Carauari, Amazonas, Brazil
- Died: 6 February 2021 (aged 69); Manaus, Amazonas, Brazil
- Occupation: Singer

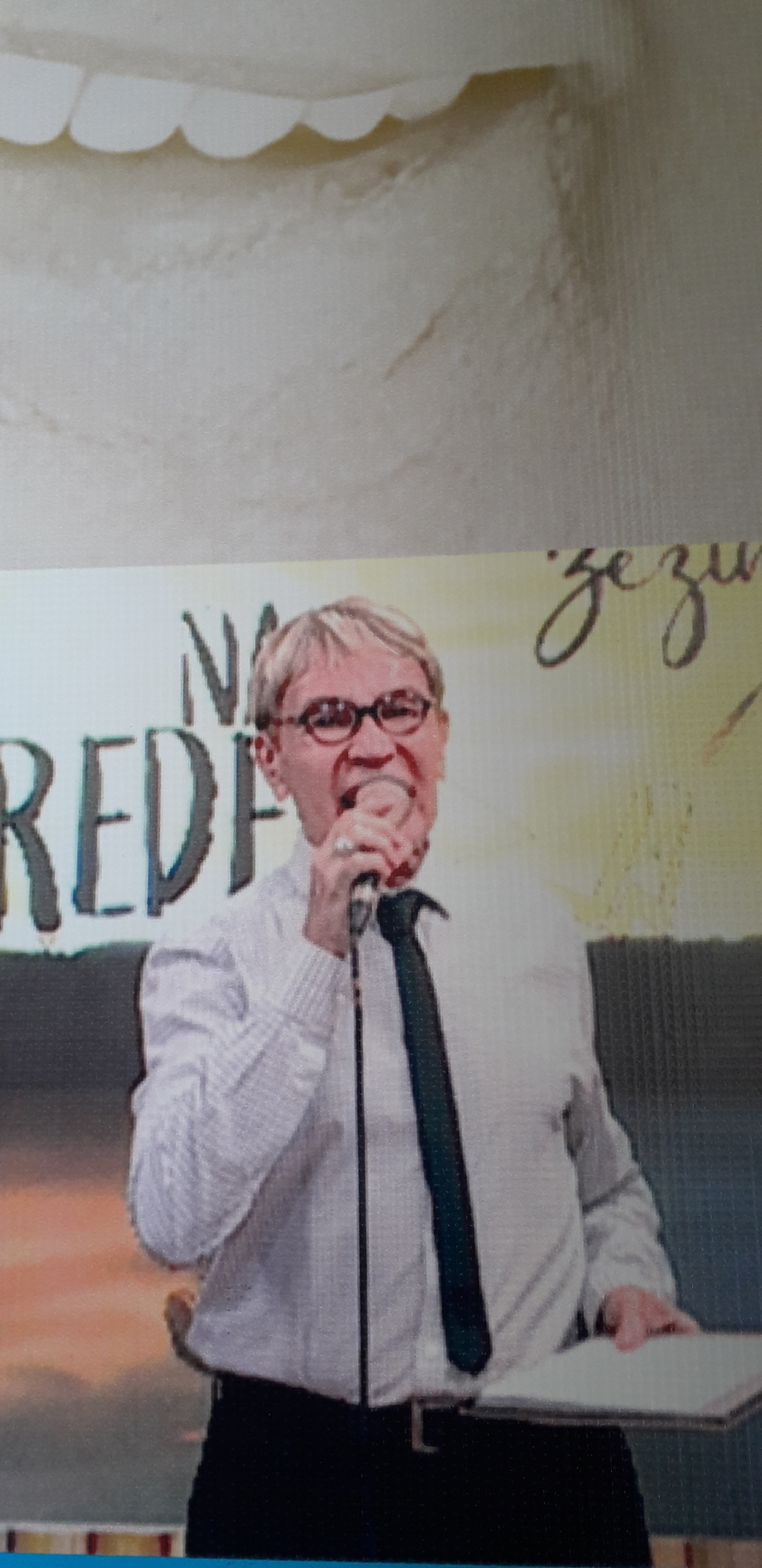

Zezinho Corrêa, stage name of José Maria Nunes Corrêa (21 May 1951 – 6 February 2021) was a Brazilian singer best known for his role as lead singer of the band Carrapicho.

== Biography ==
Corrêa was born in Carauari in the state of Amazonas. He started his career as an actor, training in Rio de Janeiro. He acted in several musicals before he started singing in the 1980s. He joined the group Carrapicho, which broke out in the 1990s with the hit single Tic, Tic Tac. In addition to his career with the band, he had a successful solo career, recording a solo CD at the Amazon Theatre in 2001 and participated in the Christmas music festival "Ceci e a Estrela" in 2017.

Zezinho Corrêa died of complications from COVID-19 in Manaus on 6 February 2021, at the age of 69.
