= Carrapicho =

Brazilian music group

Carrapicho Band
- Origin: Parintins, Amazonas, Brazil
- Genres: Latin pop, Brazilian music, Forró
- Years active: 1980–2002; 2007–2021
- Labels: Arista, BMG
- Past members: Zezinho Corrêa; Tatiana Oliveira; Ianael Santos; Hudson Praia; Hira Mesquita

Carrapicho was a Brazilian music group, created in the 80's in Manaus, Brazil.
Members are natives of the state of Amazonas. Its lead singer was Zezinho Corrêa. The group has sold a total of more than 15 million records around the world.

== History ==
Carrapicho was created in 1980 in Manaus. Earlier works were released in the Brazilian style known as forró, and they were known throughout the North of Brazil for it. At the end of 1980s, the Parintins Folklore Festival tunes were commonly in their work, but not leaving forró behind. The group worked regionally for sixteen years, until a French singer, Patrick Bruel, heard their song "Tic, Tic Tac" in 1996 and decided to launch it in his country, France, where it reached the number one spot. It also charted in several European countries, including the top 10 in Belgium and Spain.

In Brazil itself, the song was at #34 of the 100 most played songs of that year, and in Canada the song reached its peak of #14 (Nielsen SoundScan).

The band performed their song on national television in Brazil, at the Sistema Brasileiro de Televisão, thanks to Gugu Liberato, a television host of a big show called Domingo Legal. He discovered them on holiday in the summer of 1996 and decided to invite the group to participate on his program in the same year. The group's performance, set to the beat of the Boi music, received good reviews by the audience.

The song was re-recorded with girl group Chilli and produced by German musician and producer Frank Farian: this remix was released in May 1997. A cover of the song has also been made in Russian by the Uyghur singer Murat Nasyrov.

Carrapicho claims to be spreading the Amazonian culture in the world through their music. Currently, as said above, the band plays Forró, a Brazilian music genre and dance, despite not focusing only on folklore themes.

The band went on hiatus from 2002 to 2007.

Lead singer Zezinho Corrêa died on February 6, 2021, aged 69, due to COVID-19.

== Members ==
- Zezinho Corrêa – lead vocals
- Raimundo Nonato do Nascimento – percussion and backing vocals
- Roberto Bezerra de Oliveira (Bopp) - acoustic and electric guitar
- Robertinho Chaves - (electric guitar and charango)
- Rosilvado Cordeiro - (electric guitar and charango)
- Ailton Arruda - (electric guitar and charango)
- Mauro Drummond (electric guitar and charango)
- Otavio Rodrigues da Silva – bass
- Edson Ferreira do Vale – accordion
- Carlinhos Bandeira – keyboards
- Ronalto Jesus (Chinna) and Luciano Canindé – drums and percussion

== Dancers ==
- Ianael Santos
- Tatiana Oliveira
- Hira Mesquita
- Hudson Praia

== Discography ==
- 1983 – Carrapicho – Continental
- 1985 – Grupo Carrapicho – Gravasom
- 1987 – Forró Gingado – Continental
- 1988 – Êita! Chegou A Hora! – GEL Chantecler
- 1989 – Com Jeitinho Doce – Chantecler / Continental
- 1992 – Sacolejo – Continental
- 1994 – 13 anos de sucesso – Continental
- 1994 – Baticundum – Independent
- 1995 – Bumbalanço – Independent
- 1996 – Grandes Sucessos – Independent
- 1996 – Festa de Boi Bumba – BMG, #9 [POR https://books.google.com.vc/books?hl=pt-PT&id=vgcEAAAAMBAJ]
- 1997 – Rebola – BMG
- 1998 – Quero Amor – BMG
- 2000 – Trem de Marrakesh – Universal Music
- 2001 – Gente da Floresta – Universal Music
- 2002 – Carrapicho no Forró – Universal Music
- 2004 – Ritmo Quente – Sound Brazil/Free Sound
