= Christopher Nugent (American soldier) =

- Born: c. 1838; County Cavan, Ireland
- Died: May 6, 1898 (aged 59–60)
- Burial place: Saint Raymond's Cemetery, Bronx, New York
- Military career
- Allegiance: United States; Union
- Branch: United States Marine Corps
- Service years: 1858–1865
- Rank: Orderly sergeant
- Unit: USS Fort Henry (1862)
- Conflicts: American Civil War
- Awards: Medal of Honor

Christopher Nugent (c. 1838 – May 6, 1898) was an orderly sergeant serving in the United States Marine Corps who received the United States military's highest decoration for bravery, the Medal of Honor, for his actions during the American Civil War.

Nugent was born in Ireland and after immigrating to the United States, joined the United States Marine Corps. He served on several vessels including the USS Fort Henry where he saw action during the American Civil War. It was while assigned to the Fort Henry that he became the third Marine to receive the Medal of Honor, for his actions, while in charge of a reconnoitering party in Florida, that forced an enemy group to retreat into a swamp. In addition to eliminating the enemy fortification they also captured weapons and destroyed equipment so it could no longer be used by the enemy.

== Early life and military career ==
Nugent was born in about 1838 in County Cavan, Ireland, and entered the Marine Corps from Charlestown, Massachusetts, on February 8, 1858. Nugent served on several different ships until he was assigned to the marine detachment aboard the steamer USS Fort Henry (1862) as an orderly sergeant. On June 15, 1863, while serving aboard Fort Henry, Sergeant Nugent was placed in charge of a small group and sent to reconnoiter an area along the Crystal River in Florida. When they were six miles up the river they discovered a small breast works. Nugent left their boat with two men and with the other four assaulted the enemy fortification. A woman was among the enemy force so he ordered his men not to fire so that she would not be injured. Although they withheld their fire they were able to drive the enemy force from their fortification, forcing them to seek safety in the swamp. The rebel officer took one shot hitting Nugent in his cap box on his belt, not injuring him. When the enemy was pushed from their fortification and forced to retreat into the swamp for safety they left weapons and equipment and documents behind that Nugent and his Marines were able to capture. Nugent's party took the weapons and items they needed and destroyed the rest so they could not be used again by the enemy before returning to their vessel. On July 30, 1863, Nugent was involved in another incident off Depot Key, Florida, when he and other members of the ship's crew captured a boat containing two men and a woman with their baggage. They were in danger of drowning and were Unionists trying to escape from the locals. For these incidents he was recommended for the United States highest decoration for bravery, the Medal of Honor. His medal was approved along with several others in General Order # 32 dated April 16, 1864 making him the third Marine in history to receive it. His complete citation reads:

Serving on board the U.S.S. Fort Henry, Crystal River, Fla., 15 June 1863. Reconnoitering on the Crystal River on this date and in charge of a boat from the Fort Henry, Orderly Sgt. Nugent ordered an assault upon a rebel breastwork fortification. In this assault, the orderly sergeant and his comrades drove a guard of 11 rebels into the swamp, capturing their arms and destroying their camp equipage while gallantly withholding fire to prevent harm to a woman among the fugitives. On 30 July 1863, he further proved his courage by capturing a boat off Depot Key, Fla., containing 2 men and a woman with their baggage.

== Later life ==
Nugent was discharged from the Marine Corps on 9 October 1865, but the Department of the Navy did not issue a discharge certificate until 25 July 1901, 3 years after his death. He died on May 6, 1898, and is buried at Saint Raymond Cemetery in Bronx, New York.

== See also ==
- List of American Civil War Medal of Honor recipients: M–P
