= Jovem Guarda =

Brazilian musical television show

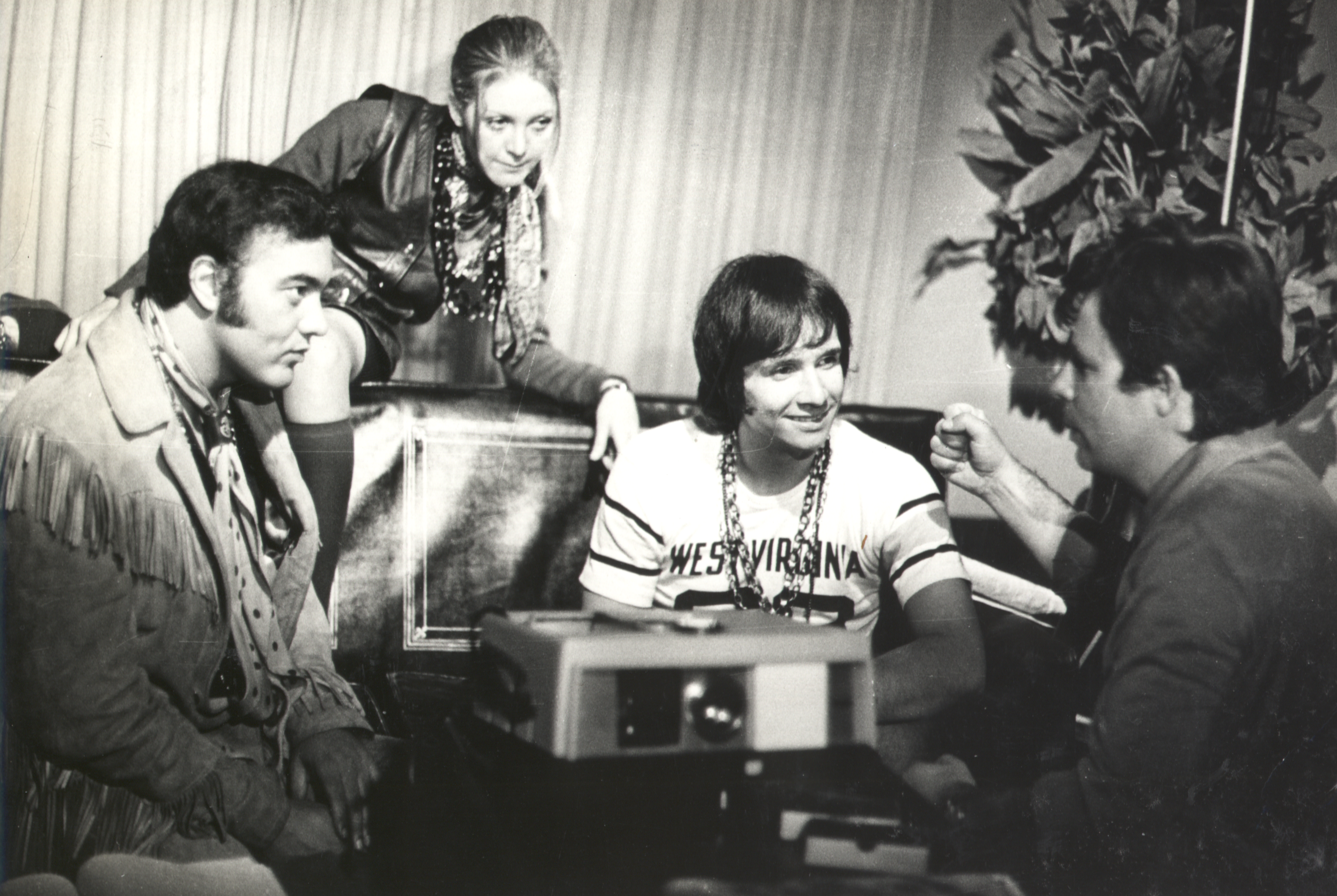
- Other names: Iê, Iê, Iê
- Stylistic origins: Rock and roll, rock pop and psychedelic rock
- Cultural origins: Early 1960s in Brazil
- Typical instruments: Guitar, drums, bass, saxophone, trumpet, organ and electric keyboard

Regional scenes
- Brazilian rock

Local scenes
- São Paulo

Jovem Guarda (Note: Jovem Guarda translates literally as "young guard". It could be interpreted as "vanguard".) was primarily a Brazilian musical television show first aired by Rede Record in 1965, although the term soon expanded to designate the entire movement and style surrounding it. The members of the program were singers who had been influenced by the American rock n' roll of the late 1950s and British Invasion bands of the 1960s, although the music often became softer, more naïve versions with light, romantic lyrics aimed at teenagers. They were Roberto Carlos, Erasmo Carlos and Wanderléa, with other bands and musicians appearing on the show as guests.

The style became popularly known as "iê-iê-iê", a term that, like French yé-yé, is most likely based on the frequent "yeah" cries heard in songs of the period (for instance, the Beatles' "She loves you/Yeah yeah yeah"). Iê-iê-iê was often considered a lesser genre, inferior to the more sophisticated bossa nova and MPB music of the period. Jovem Guarda also became a lucrative business thanks to merchandise that explored its theme and even a couple of themed motion pictures were shot during the period, thus reinforcing the idea of its lack of artistic integrity.

Jorge Ben explored Jovem Guarda-style rock during the 1960s, fusing it with samba and R&B, before his music's development into samba rock.

== History ==
Brazilian rock began in 1955, with Bill Haley, with the arrival of artists such as Elvis Presley and Chuck Berry to success, several young people in Brazil began to admire this new style. In 1956 the first Brazilian rock band, The Jordans, appeared. In 1957, the singer Celly Campello, who is now considered the mother of Brazilian rock, appeared. At the beginning of the 1960s, several Brazilian rock artists and bands began to appear, having a lot of influence from Elvis Presley, Chuck Berry, Jerry Lee Lewis and others. In 1963 the song "She Loves You" by the Beatles was very successful in Brazil; the chorus "Yeah, Yeah, Yeah" became so popular among young people that the chorus became the name of the first Brazilian youth movement, the rock and roll movement.

"Iê, ie, iê" became very popular throughout Brazil. In 1965 TV Record in São Paulo decided to show a program named Jovem Guarda every Sunday. The program would present Brazilian rock artists and bands featuring "Iê, iê, iê". The Jovem Guarda program was presented by three artists who stood out in Iê, iê, iê, the singers Roberto Carlos and Erasmo Carlos, two of the pioneers of Brazilian rock, and the singer Wanderléa.

The program was successful from the first episode, for this reason, the name of the movement was replaced by the youth from Iê, iê, iê to Jovem Guarda, after which, the singer Roberto Carlos was responsible for creating several slangs that were used by millions of young people in Brazil until today, including "Barra Limpa Mora!," "Que Broto Lindo," "Minha Caranga," "Eai Bicho" and the most famous "É Uma Brasa Mora!"

The Young Guard had mainly the Beatles as an influence, with rock and roll, pop rock and psychedelic rock. The band The Brazilian Bitles was the first to apply psychedelia in Brazilian rock. The name The Brazilian Bitles is a parody of the Beatles, but they are one of the most important bands in the Jovem Guarda. With the end of the program in 1968, the movement began to become weak with the emergence of tropicália, another very famous movement in Brazil.

The Jovem Guarda were responsible for revolutionizing music in Brazil. As the country was going through a military dictatorship, many albums by international bands and artists were not sold in Brazil, so it was with the Beatles, that their songs were often released in compilations of greatest international hits. For this reason, several artists and bands from Jovem Guarda made versions of international songs with lyrics totally different from the original, following the same rhythm. It was very popular at the time, and before recording, the artists got in contact with the original composers to be able to record the version.

The Jovem Guarda was similar to Beatlemania, with fans screaming and even invading the stage just to see their idols. Jovem Guarda changed the way of thinking of the youth of the time, being a movement that revolutionized Brazilian music with the use of rhythms. more agitated, with the voice screamed in some songs and also by the use of the organ in many songs.

One of the most important bands in Jovem Guarda is the band Renato e Seus Blue Caps, who stood out with versions of Beatles songs such as "Menian Linda" version of "I Should Have Known Better" and "Meu Primeiro Amor" version of "You're Gonna Lose That Girl."

The name Jovem Guarda was born from the phrase of the Russian leader Lenin: "The future belongs to the young guard because the old one is outdated."

== Program ==
The program Jovem Guarda debuted on 22 August 1965, on TV Record, led by three up-and-coming singers at that time. Roberto Carlos had already exploded in 1963 with a version of "Splish Splash", by Bobby Darin and DJ Murray the K, in the Brazilian version of Erasmo Carlos. For her part, Wanderléa had won several radio singer competitions and had released her first single in 1962.

The recordings took place at Teatro Record, on Rua da Consolação, in São Paulo and were broadcast live. In Rio, there was a version shown during the week directed by Carlos Manga, broadcast by TV Rio. The rest of the country had to wait and watch it on videotape, as there was no retransmission via satellite.

Over the course of an hour, the trio sang their hits and received guests. Quickly, the program became an audience leader and caused hysteria in the fans who crowded the theater's premises. The rebellious posture, the frenetic pace and the innocent lyrics, but identifiable by the teenager audience, ensured the program's success.

=== Songs ===
Young Guard's first songs were versions of hits from the American and British songbook. We can mention the version of "Girl" from The Beatles, which became the song "Meu Bem", a success in the voice of Ronnie Von. Neil Sedaka's "Stupid Cupid" was a big hit with Celly Campelo singing "Estúpido Cupido."

At the same time, Roberto Carlos and Erasmo Carlos began to make compositions following the American rock line. The lyrics spoke of dating, conquests, cars and freedom. Examples of this theme are "I Want Everything To Go To Hell," by Roberto Carlos (1965) and "Festa de Arromba," by Erasmo Carlos and Roberto Carlos (1965).

=== Aesthetics ===
The Jovem Guarda left marks on the behavior of teenagers, launching fashion and slang. Extravagant outfits included feather coats, bright colors and the ubiquitous miniskirt for girls. The hair should be long like the Beatles and the posture should be as relaxed as possible.

The language was invaded by expressions such as "É Uma Brasa Mora!", "Barra Limpa" and "É Papo Firme!". These expressions were taken from the lyrics of the songs presented in the program.

=== Legacy ===
The Jovem Guara movement dictated fashion during the boom years. The presenters influenced the young people of the time with their colorful and printed clothes, fur coats and with their long hair in the Elvis Presley style. The movement also helped to spread a variety of slang, phrases and expressions such as:

- É Uma Brasa Mora!
- Barra Limpa Mora!
- É Barra Limpíssima
- Estar por Fora
- Eai Bicho
- Broto
- Boca de Sino

Even after the program ended in 1968, the Jovem Guarda continued to exert influence. Some of its artists such as singer Sérgio Reis migrated to Sertanejo and introduced characteristics of the movement in the new style.

== Artists ==
- Roberto Carlos
- Erasmo Carlos
- Wanderléa
- Jerry Adriani
- Wanderley Cardoso
- Eduardo Araújo
- Silvinha
- Antônio Marcos
- Kátia Cilene
- Dick Danello
- Ney Matogrosso
- Paulo Sérgio
- Reginaldo Rossi
- Sérgio Reis
- Ed Wilson
- Ronnie Von
- Sérgio Murilo
- Waldirene
- Arthurzinho
- Lafayette
- Celly Campello
- Ronnie Cord
- Rossini Pinto
- Martinha
- Vanusa

== Artists ==
- Renato e Seus Blue Caps
- The Jet Blacks
- The Jordans
- Leno & Lílian
- Trio Esperança
- The Brazilian Bitles
- Os Incríveis
- Os Brasas
- Trio Tenura
- Golden Boys
- Lafayette e Seu Conjunto
- Raulzito e os Panteras
- Os Vips
- Os Snakes
- Deny e Dino
- The Clevers
- The Fevers
- Os Iguais
- Os Caçulas
- Os Tremendões
- Jane e Herondy
- The Pops
- Os Jovens

== Main hits ==
- "É Proibido Fumar"
- "Quero que Vá Tudo pro Inferno"
- "Festa de Arromba"
- "Pare o Casamento"
- "Menina Linda"
- "Splish Splash"
- "Minha Fama de Mau"
- "Sou Tremendão"
- "O Terror dos Namorados"
- "Garota Papo Firme"
- "O Bom"
- "Prova de Fogo"
- "Coração de Papel"
- "Tijolinho"
- "Tema Para Jovens Enamorados"
- "Parei na Contramão"

== See also ==
- Tropicália
- Jorge Ben Jor
- Tim Maia
- Yé-yé
- Brazilian rock
