= St. Raymond's Cemetery (Bronx) =

Catholic cemetery in Bronx, New York City, US

Saint Raymond's Cemetery
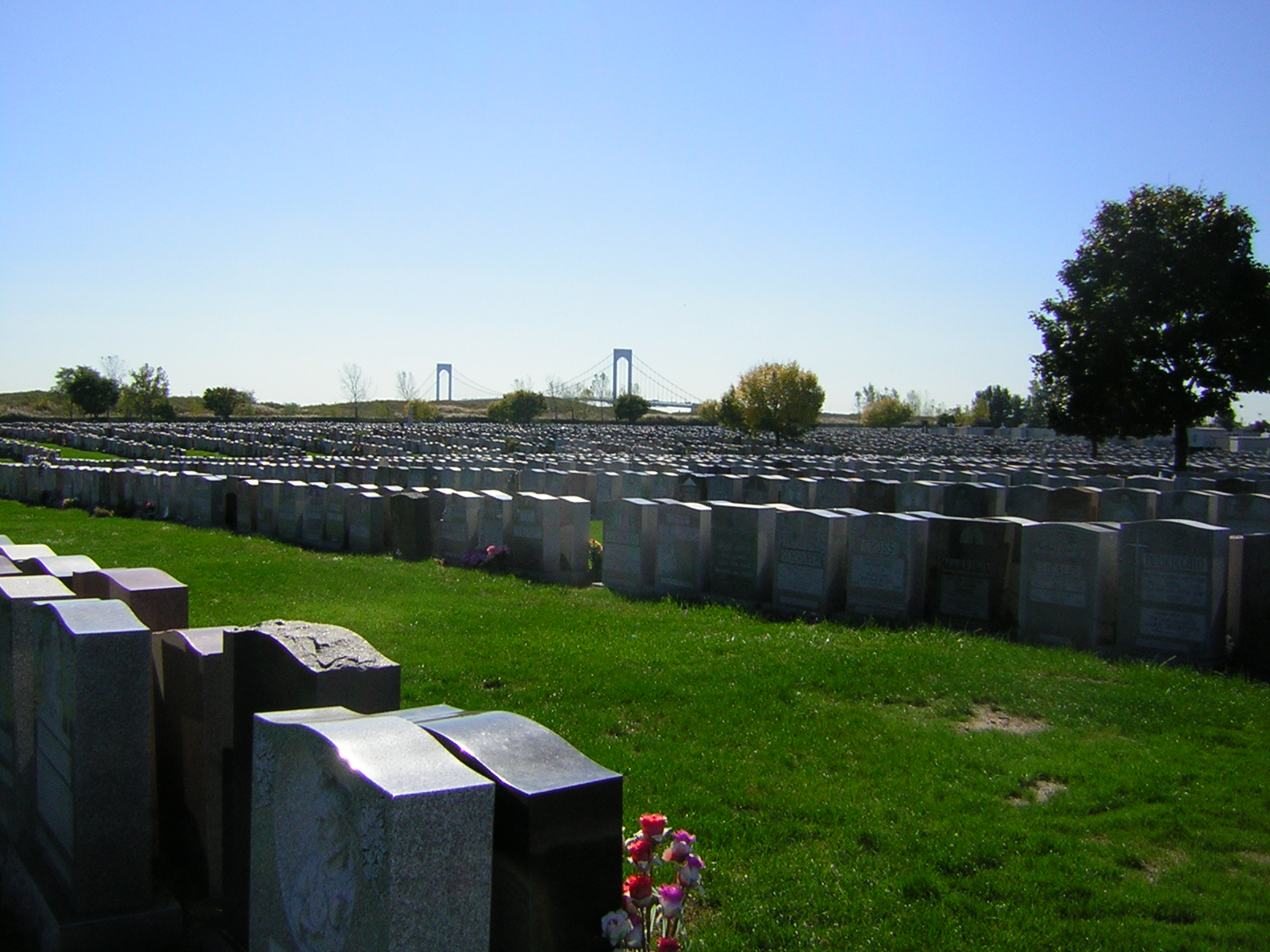
- St. Peter Section of New Saint Raymond's in 2007 with the Bronx Whitestone Bridge in background
- Interactive map of Saint Raymond's Cemetery

Details
- Location: The Bronx
- Country: United States
- Coordinates: 40°49′30″N 73°50′02″W
- Owned by: Archdiocese of New York

Saint Raymond's Cemetery is a large Catholic parish cemetery in the Throggs Neck and Schuylerville sections of the Bronx, New York City. It is the only Catholic cemetery in the Bronx and is one of the busiest cemeteries in the United States with nearly 2,500 burials each year. Through its connection to St. Raymond's Church, part of the Archdiocese of New York, the cemetery is dedicated in honor of 13th-century saint Raymond Nonnatus.

The cemetery is composed of two separate locations. Old Saint Raymond's is to the north at 1201 Balcom Avenue, and New Saint Raymond's is to the south at 2600 Lafayette Avenue, which is also the location of the main office. Both locations are just east of the Hutchinson River Parkway. The Bronx–Whitestone Bridge is visible from New Saint Raymond's.

The old cemetery is essentially full and most present-day burials take place at the new cemetery, with the first burial there in 1951. The cemetery provides in-ground burials, in-ground crypt burials in the new Holy Cross section, Mausoleum burials and niches for cremains and burials in the base of the gigantic granite Cross located in the Holy Cross section. There is also a special Garden of Innocents where still-born and young babies are buried. A portion of the St. Peters section was set aside in 1964 for the burial of the Archdiocese's clergymen.

== History ==
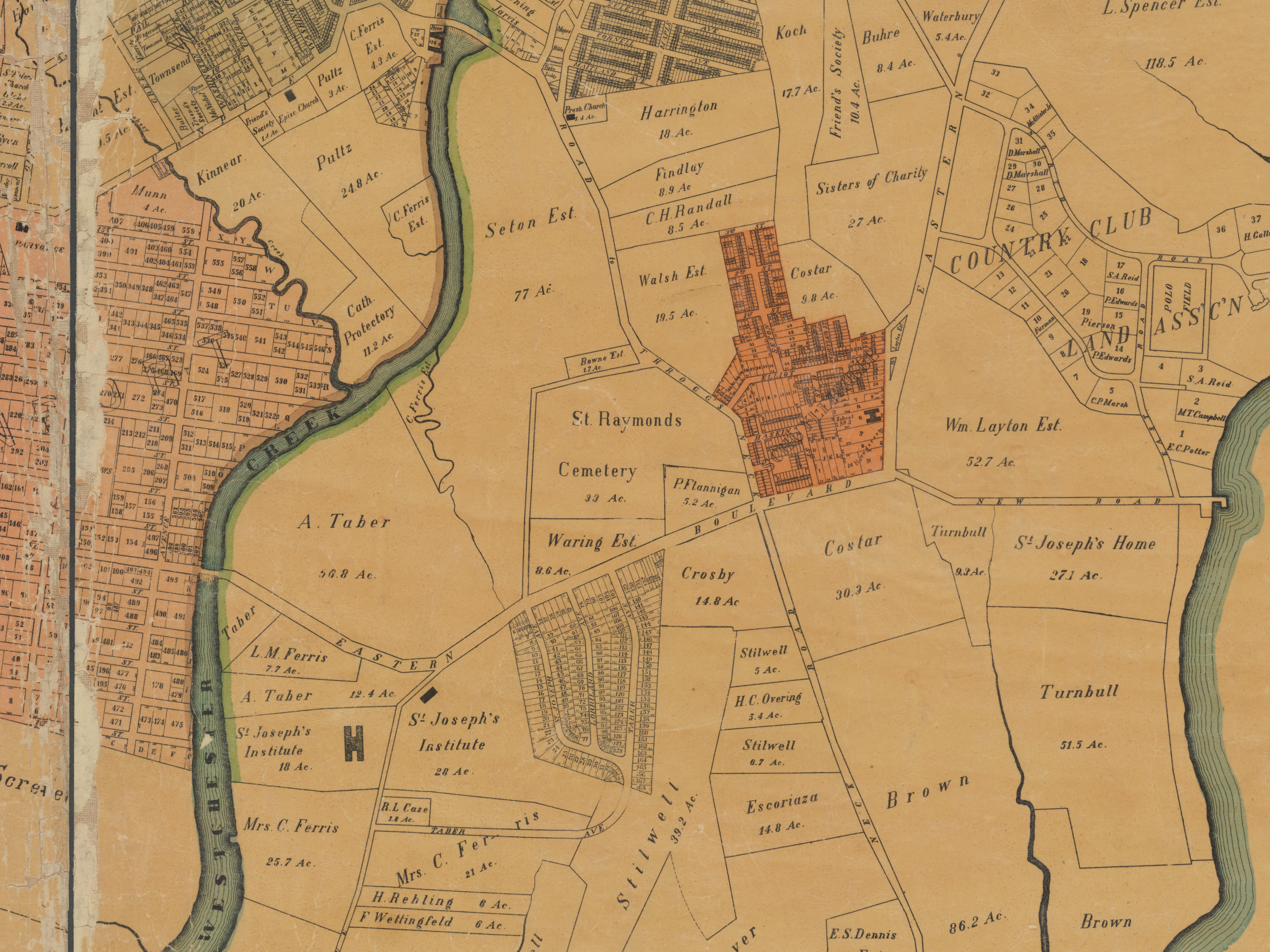
1891 map of the vicinity of Old St. Raymond's. The cemetery acquired some of the adjacent Seton Estate after World War I. New St. Raymond's now occupies the space roughly south of the St. Joseph's Institute parcel.

The original cemetery was in the immediate vicinity of St. Raymond's Church, which opened in 1845 and was enlarged in 1847, but was full by the mid 1870s.

The land of Old Saint Raymond's was originally the Underhill Farm. It was purchased and consecrated by Michael B. McEvoy, pastor of St. Raymond's Church, and the cemetery opened in 1876. After World War I, Old Saint Raymond's expanded with the purchase of land from the estate of Elizabeth Ann Seton's family, which was contiguous with the existing cemetery.

Shortly after his son's kidnapping in 1932, aviator Charles Lindbergh and Bronx resident John Condon met with the alleged kidnapper at St. Raymond's to deliver $50,000 in ransom money. Despite the payment, the child's body was found a few months later. Bruno Richard Hauptmann was convicted of the murder in 1935 and executed the following year.

New Saint Raymond's opened in the 1950s. In the mid-1990s, New Saint Raymond's expanded by acquiring an 11-acre parcel at its southwest.

== Notable burials ==
=== Military ===
- Private William Joseph Bray, Veterans Guard of Canada service member killed during World War II; one of three gravesites of British Commonwealth servicemen at St. Raymond's Cemetery administered by the Commonwealth War Graves Commission.
- James Austin Byrnes, Royal Air Force cadet killed during World War I; one of three gravesites of British Commonwealth servicemen at St. Raymond's Cemetery administered by the Commonwealth War Graves Commission.
- Francis P. Duffy, Canadian-American soldier and chaplain (1871–1932)
- John J. Nolan, Civil War Medal of Honor recipient (1842–1912)
- Christopher Nugent, Civil War Medal of Honor recipient (1838–1898)

=== Politicians ===
- James Kerrigan, Civil War Union Army officer; U.S. Congressman (1828–1899)
- George William Loft, businessman & politician (1865–1943)
- Charles C. Marrin, New York State Assemblyman and Municipal Court Justice (1868–1950)
- John E. McGeehan, former New York State Supreme Court judge (1880–1968)
- Arthur H. Murphy first Democratic County Chairman in the Bronx (1868–1922)
- John P. Nugent, New York State Assemblyman and New York City Councilman (1879–1944)
- Duncan T. O'Brien, politician (1895–1938)
- Frank G. Rossetti, former New York State Senator (1908–1992)
- William F. Smith, member of the New York State Assembly (1901–1950)

=== Entertainment ===
- Henry "Red" Allen, jazz trumpeter (1906–1967)
- Kyrle Bellew, British stage-actor (1850–1911)
- Michael Coleman, Irish fiddle player (1891–1945)
- Carlos de Jesus, NYC radio DJ (WKTU), television host (New York Hot Tracks) and hip-hop music pioneer (1953-2012)
- Billie Holiday, jazz singer (1915–1959)
- Jackie Landry Jackson, member of girl group The Chantels (1941–1997)
- La Lupe, salsa music singer (1936–1992)
- Héctor Lavoe, salsa music musician (1946–1993) (Note: Lavoe's remains and those of his son were exhumed in June 2002 and reburied next to those of his late wife at Cementerio Civil de Ponce in Ponce, Puerto Rico, as per the request of his family.)
- Lillian Lorraine, vaudeville entertainer (1895–1955)
- Frankie Lymon, singer (1942–1968)
- James Morrison, Irish-American fiddler and band leader (1891–1947)
- Lois Nettleton, actress (1927–2008)
- Charlie Palmieri, Latin jazz musician (1927-1988)
- Frank Pesce, actor (1946-2022)
- Steve Vibert Pouchie, Latin Jazz, maestro (1954–2015)
- Hilton Ruiz, musician/composer (1952–2006)
- Merlin Santana, actor (1976–2002)
- Patsy Touhey, celebrated uilleann piper (1865–1923)
- Dave Valentin, American Latin jazz flautist

=== Sports ===
- Hector "Macho" Camacho, Puerto Rican professional boxer, three division world champion (1962–2012)
- Silvio Coucci, United States National Champion jockey (1914-1941)
- Benny "Kid" Paret, Cuban professional boxer, two times world Welterweight champion (1937–1962)

=== Organized crime ===
- Joseph "The Baker" Catania, mobster (1902–1931)
- Peter Coll, Gangster, rumrunner and brother of Vincent "Mad Dog" Coll.
- Vincent "Mad Dog" Coll, mobster (1908–1932)
- Anthony Salerno, mobster (1911–1992)

=== Others ===
- Anjelica Castillo, notable murder victim known in the press as "Baby Hope"
- Anthony de Francisci, sculptor (1887–1964)
- Lesandro "Junior" Guzman-Feliz, notable gang violence victim (2002–2018)
- Mary Mallon (also known as "Typhoid Mary"), notable asymptomatic carrier (1869–1938)
- Thomas H. O'Shea, Irish revolutionary and US labor organizer (1898–1962)
- Joseph Maria Pernicone, first Italian-born bishop in the Archdiocese of New York (1903–1985)
- Cristina Santiago (1981–2011), LGBT activist; one of seven victims killed during the August 2011 Indiana State Fair stage collapse
- Godfrey E. Santini, one of the Seven Santini Brothers (1889–1956)
- Valentina Suriani, notable murder victim (1958–1977)
- Henry Paul Michael Zary, Royal Canadian Air Force Squadron Leader killed during World War II; one of three gravesites of British Commonwealth servicemen at St. Raymond's Cemetery administered by the Commonwealth War Graves Commission.
