= Charles C. Marrin =

American lawyer and politician (1868–1950)

Charles C. Marrin (October 9, 1868 – February 1, 1950) was an American lawyer, politician, and judge from New York.

== Life ==
Marrin was born on October 9, 1868, in New York City, New York on West 47th Street, the son of lawyer Joseph J. Marrin.

Marrin graduated from St. John's College in Fordham with honors in 1889. He then studied law in Fordham. In 1892, he was elected to the New York State Assembly as a Democrat, representing the New York County 30th District. He served in the Assembly in 1893 (when he submitted a bill to authorize the commissioner of the department of public improvements in the 23rd and 24th wards of New York to take summary proceedings to improve the sewers and drainage of those wards and a bill related to the Post-Graduate Hospital) and 1894 (when he submitted a number of bills to amend the New York City charter, including bills to employ school trustees, provide additional school accommodations, continue street improvements in the 23rd and 24th wards, improve Pelham Park, and provide for a canal bridge at Mott Haven). He was one of the youngest members in the Legislature. He lost the 1894 re-election to the Assembly to Republican William White Niles.

Marrin studied law in his father's law office. Following his time in the Assembly, he spent several years in the County Clerk's office and briefly served as executive secretary to Bronx Borough President Louis F. Haffen. He was admitted to the bar in 1907, and shortly afterwards Mayor George B. McClellan Jr. appointed him Deputy Water Commissioner. He resigned from the position a few years later to join his father's law practice. During that time, he was elected president of the Confederated Parents Association of the Bronx and chairman of the Greater New York Federation of Parents Association. He served as assistant Corporation Counsel of New York City from 1918 to 1933, under four different Corporation Counsels, and in 1924 he took charge of the department's tort division. In 1933, Mayor John P. O'Brien appointed him a Municipal Court Justice of the Second District, the Bronx, to fill a vacancy caused by the death of Justice William E. Morris. He unsuccessfully ran for the office as the Liberal Party candidate in 1934, after which he returned to private practice.

Marrin was a member of the Friendly Sons of St. Patrick, the Irish-American Historical Society, the Columbian Order, the Bronx Friends of Erin, the Old Timers Association of the Bronx, and several legal groups. In 1896, he married Margaret T. Kerrigan. His children were attorney Joseph J., physician Charles A., and Mrs. Margaret T. Murtaugh.

Marrin died in the Goldwater Memorial Hospital on Welfare Island on February 1, 1950. He was buried in Saint Raymond's Cemetery.

New York State Assembly
Preceded by District Created	New York State Assembly; New York County, 30th District; 1893–1894	Succeeded by William White Niles
