= 1: The Collection =

Greatest hits album by Julio Iglesias
- Released: 12 May 2014
- Studio: Sony Music Latin
- Genres: Latin pop, pop

Julio Iglesias chronology
1 (2011)	1: The Collection (2014)	México (2015)

1: The Collection is a greatest hits compilation album by Julio Iglesias, released in May 2014 on Sony Music.

It contains a selection of previously released recordings of love ballads. Some tracks were remastered.

== Track listing ==
No.	Title	Length
1.	"Begin the Beguine (Volver a Empezar)" (Remastered Version)
2.	"Crazy" (Remastered Version)
3.	"When I Need You" (Remastered Version)
4.	"Vincent (Starry Night)" (Remastered Version)
5.	"99 Miles from L.A."
6.	"And I Love Her"
7.	"Always on My Mind"
8.	"Crazy in Love" (Remastered Version)
9.	"Fragile" (Remastered Version)
10.	"Caruso" (Remastered Version)
11.	"To All the Girls I've Loved Before" (Remastered Version)
12.	"All of You" (Remastered Version)
13.	"My Love" (Remastered Version)
14.	"When You Tell Me That You Love Me"
15.	"Summer Wind" (Duet with Frank Sinatra)
16.	"Let It Be Me"
17.	"Smoke Gets in Your Eyes" (Duet with All-4-One)
18.	"As Time Goes By (From the Motion Picture "Casablanca")" (Live Version)

== Charts ==
Chart (2014)	Peak position
UK (Official Charts Company)	81
Ireland (Albums Top 100)	49
