= Marcos Roberto =

- Born: Marcos Roberto Dias Cardoso; June 26, 1941; São Paulo, SP, Brazil
- Died: July 21, 2012 (aged 71)
- Years active: 1960s–2012

Marcos Roberto Dias Cardoso (June 26, 1941, in São Paulo – July 21, 2012, in Osasco), also known as Marcos Roberto, was a singer and Brazilian composer, successful since the 1960s and in the 1980s with the song A Última Carta, which was in first place on the charts for months and sold more than 2 million records.

== Biography ==
One of the most awarded singers, won the Chico Viola trophy and various platinum and diamond records. Due to his great success, he participated in the most important radio and television music programs of the time. The song "A Última Carta" originally was composed by composer Antonio Marcelino Vieira from Rio Grande do Norte, nicknamed AMV, dying in 2006, who donated the lyrics and melody to Marcos Roberto, by occasion of a presentation that the latter would do in a small city of Rio Grande do Norte, in 1970. The song donations – by small composers to nationally renown artists – was a common fact in the 60s–70s, in the Brazilian northeast.

Marcos Roberto was, lastly, the productor for new singers and bands and kept composing songs. Marcos was one of the names connected to the program Jovem Guarda in the 60s, consecrated participant in the program, hosted by Roberto Carlos on TV Record. Participated with great shine on the show of Rádio América, on March 15, 1968, on the old Cine Piratininga do Brás, spectacle hosted by José Paulo de Andrade, Sérgio de Freitas and Newton Miranda, hosts of one of the biggest radio teenage programs of the time.

Marcos Roberto died on 21 July 2012 at 71 years old, due to multiple organ failure. The singer was hospitalized at Hospital Municipal Antônio Giglio, in the city of Osasco, São Paulo. According to friends and relatives, he was suffering from depression due to the death of his wife, a cancer victim.
