= List of Hot 100 number-one singles of 2015 (Brazil) =

This is a list of number one singles on the Billboard Brasil Hot 100 chart in 2015.

== Chart history ==
Issue date	Song	Artist(s)	Reference
January 10	"Cuida Bem Dela"	Henrique & Juliano	
January 17	"Cuida Bem Dela"	Henrique & Juliano	
January 24	"Agora (Ahora)"	Bruno & Marrone	
January 31	"Eu Não Merecia Isso"	Luan Santana	
February 7	"Um Degrau na Escada (Ao Vivo)"	Leonardo & Eduardo Costa	
February 14	"Agora (Ahora)"	Bruno & Marrone	
February 21	"Agora (Ahora)"	Bruno & Marrone	
February 28	"Agora (Ahora)"	Bruno & Marrone	
March 7	"Presto Pouco" (featuring Gregory & Gabriel)	João Neto & Frederico	
March 14	"Suíte 14" (featuring MC Guimê)	Henrique & Diego	
March 21	"Suíte 14" (featuring MC Guimê)	Henrique & Diego	
March 28	"Suíte 14" (featuring MC Guimê)	Henrique & Diego	
April 4	"Suíte 14" (featuring MC Guimê)	Henrique & Diego	
April 11	"Suíte 14" (featuring MC Guimê)	Henrique & Diego	
April 18	"10 Minutos Longe de Você" (featuring Henrique & Juliano)	Victor & Leo	
April 25	"Escreve Aí"	Luan Santana	
May 2	"Escreve Aí"	Luan Santana	
May 9	"Escreve Aí"	Luan Santana	
May 16	"Escreve Aí"	Luan Santana	
May 25	"Escreve Aí"	Luan Santana	
June 1	"10 Minutos Longe de Você" (featuring Henrique & Juliano)	Victor & Leo	
June 8	"Escreve Aí"	Luan Santana	
June 15	"Escreve Aí"	Luan Santana	
June 22	"Escreve Aí"	Luan Santana	
June 29	"Escreve Aí"	Luan Santana	
July 6	"Escreve Aí"	Luan Santana	
July 13	"Escreve Aí"	Luan Santana	
July 20	"Escreve Aí"	Luan Santana	
July 27	"Escreve Aí"	Luan Santana	
August 3	"Escreve Aí"	Luan Santana	
August 10	"Escreve Aí"	Luan Santana	
August 17	"Sapequinha"	Eduardo Costa	
August 24	"Aquele 1%" (featuring Wesley Safadão)	Marcos & Belutti	
August 31	"Escreve Aí"	Luan Santana	

== See also ==
- Billboard Brasil
- Crowley Broadcast Analysis
