= Sérgio Reis =

Brazilian actor and singer

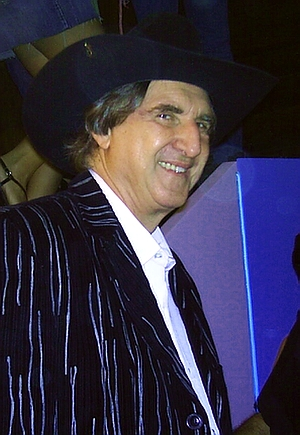

Federal Deputy for São Paulo
- In office February 1, 2015 – February 1, 2019

Personal details
- Born: Sérgio Bavini; June 23, 1940 (age 86) São Paulo, Brazil
- Party: REPUBLICANOS (2014–present)
- Musical career
- Origin: Brazil
- Genre: Sertanejo
- Occupations: singer, actor, politician
- Instruments: Viola, vocals
- Website: www.sergioreis.com.br

Sergio Bavini, known as Sérgio Reis (born June 23, 1940), is a Brazilian sertanejo singer, actor and politician. He has sold approximately 16 million copies of his more than 40 album releases.

Reis was born in São Paulo, and began working in radio stations and nightclubs as a teenager. In 1958, he released his first record, "Enganadora" b/w "Será", but did not garner any notice. In 1967 he was invited to record with The Jet Blacks, and the resulting singles – "Coração de Papel," "Nuvem Branquinha," "Fim de Sonho," and "Qual a Razão," all shot to the top of the Brazilian charts. He became a fixture on Jovem Guarda radio and television, writing songs for Jerry Adriani, Wanderley Cardoso, Nalva Aguiar, Deny e Dino, Marcos Roberto, and The Golden Boys.

Reis's style mixes caipira music with a heavy influence from American pop and country. Among his most well-known songs are "O Menino da Porteira," "O Menino da Gaita", "João de Barro", "Rei do Gado", "Cabocla Teresa" "Os Três Boiadeiros," and "Cavalo Zaino." Alongside his music career he has appeared often in film and television, including Brazilian soap operas.

In 2015, his album Amizade Sincera II, a partnership with Renato Teixeira, was nominated for the 16th Latin Grammy Awards in the Best Sertaneja Music Album category.

== Discography ==
- 1967 – Coração de Papel
- 1969 – Anjo Triste
- 1973 – Sérgio Reis
- 1974 – João de Barro
- 1975 – Saudade de Minha Terra
- 1976 – Retrato do Meu Sertão
- 1977 – Sérgio Reis – Disco de ouro
- 1977 – O Menino da Porteira
- 1977 – Relaciones Internacionales
- 1978 – Mágoa de Boiadeiro
- 1978 – Natureza
- 1979 – Sérgio Reis
- 1980 – Sérgio Reis
- 1980 – Sérgio Reis – Disco de ouro
- 1981 – Boiadeiro Errante
- 1982 – O Melhor de Sérgio Reis
- 1982 – Os Grandes Sucessos de Sérgio Reis
- 1982 – A Sanfona do Menino
- 1983 – Sérgio Reis – Disco de ouro
- 1983 – Sérgio Reis
- 1984 – Sérgio Reis
- 1985 – Sérgio Reis
- 1985 – O Melhor de Sérgio Reis – Vol. 2
- 1987 – Sérgio Reis
- 1988 – Sérgio Reis
- 1989 – Sérgio Reis
- 1990 – Pantaneiro
- 1991 – Sérgio Reis
- 1993 – Sérgio Reis
- 1993 – Sérgio Reis – Acervo Especial
- 1994 – Ventos Uivantes
- 1995 – Grandes Sucessos de Sérgio Reis
- 1995 – Os Originais – Sérgio Reis
- 1996 – Marcando Estrada
- 1996 – O Rei do Gado
- 1997 – Vida Violeira
- 1997 – Boiadeiro
- 1998 – Sérgio Reis – Coleção JT
- 1998 – Sérgio Reis – Do Tamanho do Brasil
- 1998 – Essencial
- 1999 – Sérgio Reis – Popularidade
- 1999 – Essencial de Sérgio Reis
- 1999 – Melhor de Sérgio Reis
- 2000 – Série Bis – Jovem Guarda
- 2000 – Sérgio Reis – Dose Dupla
- 2000 – 40 anos de Estrada
- 2000 – Sérgio Reis & Convidados
- 2000 – Sérgio Reis
- 2001 – Sérgio Reis – 100 anos de Música
- 2002 – Sérgio Reis – Nossas Canções
- 2003 – O Divino Espírito do Sertão
- 2003 – Sérgio Reis e Filhos – Violas e Violeiros
- 2007 – Tributo a Goiás
- 2008 – Coração Estradeiro
- 2009 – 50 Anos Cantando o Brasil
- 2010 – Amizade Sincera (ao vivo, com Renato Teixeira)
- 2013 – Questão de Tempo
- 2015 – Amizade Sincera II (ao vivo, com Renato Teixeira)

== Acting career ==
Films

- O Menino da Porteira (1976) – Diogo Mendonça
- Mágoas de Boiadeiro (1977)
- Filho Adotivo (1984)

Television

- Paraiso (1982)
- Pantanal (1990 – Rede Manchete) – Tibério
- A História de Ana Raio e Zé Trovão (1990/1991– Manchete)
- O Rei do Gado (1996/1997– Rede Globo)- Zé Bento (Saracura)
- Canavial de Paixões (2003/2004– SBT)
- Bicho do Mato (2006– Record)- Geraldo
