= México (Julio Iglesias album) =

Studio album by Julio Iglesias
- Released: 25 September 2015
- Genre: Latin pop, vocal
- Label: Sony Music, S.a.

Julio Iglesias chronology
1: The Collection (2014)	México (2015)

Singles from México
- 1. "Fallaste corazón" Released: 2015

México is a 2015 studio album of Spanish international singer Julio Iglesias released on Sony Music. It reached number 1 on Productores de Música de España (PROMUSICAE) Official Albums Chart. It also charted in a great number of European chart. The single "Fallaste corazón", a cover of Pedro Infante hit was also a charting single in Spain.

== Track listing ==
1. "Usted" (3:28)
2. "Júrame" (4:07)
3. "Ella" (3:46)
4. "Fallaste corazón" (4:00)
5. "Sway" (3:30)
6. "Amanecí en tus brazos" (3:17)
7. "Échame a mí la culpa" (Version 2015) (3:32)
8. "Juan Charrasqueado" (3:45)
9. "Y nos dieron las diez" (4:48)
10. "La media vuelta" (3:18)
11. "Se me olvidó otra vez" (3:01)
12. "México lindo" (2:46)
13. "Quién será" (Bonus Track) (2:43)

== Charts ==
Chart (2015)	Peak position
Belgian Albums (Ultratop Flanders)	63
Belgian Albums (Ultratop Wallonia)	26
Dutch Albums (Album Top 100)	64
French Albums (SNEP)	140
Portuguese Albums (AFP)	9
Spanish Albums (PROMUSICAE)	1
US Top Latin Albums (Billboard)	2
US Latin Pop Albums (Billboard)	1

== Certifications ==
Region	Certification	Certified units/sales
Spain (PROMUSICAE)	Gold	20,000^{‡}
^{‡} Sales+streaming figures based on certification alone.

== See also ==
- List of number-one albums of 2015 (Spain)
