= List of number-one albums of 2015 (Spain) =

Top 100 España is a record chart published weekly by PROMUSICAE (Productores de Música de España), a non-profit organization composed by Spain and multinational record companies. This association tracks record sales (physical and digital) in Spain.

== Albums ==
Week	Chart date	Album	Artist(s)	Ref
1	January 4	Terral	Pablo Alborán	
2	January 11	Terral	Pablo Alborán	
3	January 18	Terral	Pablo Alborán	
4	January 25	Terral	Pablo Alborán	
5	February 1	Terral	Pablo Alborán	
6	February 8	Wallflower	Diana Krall	
7	February 15	Terral	Pablo Alborán	
8	February 22	Hey Babe!	Calum	
9	March 1	Break of Day	Sweet California	
10	March 8	500 noches para una crisis	Joaquín Sabina	
11	March 15	Rebel Heart	Madonna	
12	March 22	500 noches para una crisis	Joaquín Sabina	
13	March 29	Código Rocker	Loquillo & Un Niles	
14	April 5	500 noches para una crisis	Joaquín Sabina	
15	April 12	500 noches para una crisis	Joaquín Sabina	
16	April 19	Circus Avenue	Auryn	
17	April 26	Cama Incendiada	Maná	
18	May 3	Mil y una noches	Gemeliers	
19	May 10	Sirope	Alejandro Sanz	
20	May 17	Sirope	Alejandro Sanz	
21	May 24	Sirope	Alejandro Sanz	
22	May 31	Sirope	Alejandro Sanz	
23	June 7	Sirope	Alejandro Sanz	
24	June 14	Lo que aletea en nuestras cabezas	Robe	
25	June 21	Sirope	Alejandro Sanz	
26	June 28	Who I AM	Abraham Mateo	
27	July 5	Sirope	Alejandro Sanz	
28	July 9	Mil y una noches	Gemeliers	
29	July 16	Sirope	Alejandro Sanz	
30	July 23	Sirope	Alejandro Sanz	
31	July 30	El viaje	Antonio José	
32	August 6	El viaje	Antonio José	
33	August 13	El viaje	Antonio José	
34	August 20	El viaje	Antonio José	
35	August 27	Burning Bridges	Bon Jovi	
36	September 3	Sirope	Alejandro Sanz	
37	September 10	The Book of Souls	Iron Maiden	
38	September 17	Quién me ha visto...	Rozalén	
39	September 24	Head for the Stars	Sweet California	
40	October 1	México	Julio Iglesias	
41	October 8	Rumba a lo desconocido	Estopa	
42	October 15	Rumba a lo desconocido	Estopa	
43	October 22	Rumba a lo desconocido	Estopa	
44	October 29	Directo	Vanesa Martín	
45	November 5	Bailar el Viento	Manuel Carrasco	
46	November 12	Bailar el Viento	Manuel Carrasco	
47	November 19	Made in the A.M.	One Direction	
48	November 26	25	Adele	
49	December 3	Caos	Malú	
50	December 10	Ghost Town	Auryn	
51	December 17	25	Adele	
52	December 24	25	Adele	
53	December 31	25	Adele	
