= Azteca Records =

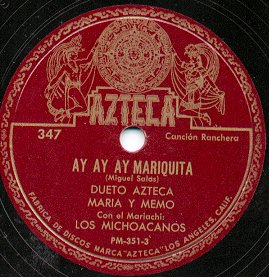
- Founded: 1940s
- Founder: Trinidad Pelaez
- Genre: Mexican music

Azteca Records was a mid 20th century record label specializing in Mexican music. Azteca Records was founded by Trinidad Pelaez in the 1940s as Discos Azteca with retail as well as recording. Many titles were released in Mexico on the Peerless Records imprint. By the 1960s the label and shops were acquired by Al Sherman of Alshire Records in Burbank, California. The label was mostly marketed in Mexico, but was manufactured in Los Angeles, California, in the United States of America.

== See also ==
- Record labels based in California
- List of record labels
