= Pía Sebastiani =

Argentine pianist and composer

Olimpia Ana Pía Sebastiani (27 February 1925 – 26 July 2015) was an Argentine pianist and composer.

She studied under teachers such as Alfredo Pinto, Juan Fanelli, Georges de Lalewicz, in her hometown of Buenos Aires. In 1941, Sebastiani composed and performed a concert for piano and orchestra. She was a member of the Beethoven Conservatory. His piano concertos took her to some of the most important music halls in the world, such as Carnegie Hall and Wigmore Hall.

She taught at the Ball State University School of Music.

Sebastiani died on 26 July 2015 in Buenos Aires at the age of 90.
