= USS Fort Henry =

Gunboat of the United States Navy

History

United States
- Name: USS Fort Henry
- Namesake: Fort Henry, Tennessee, site of an early Union victory
- Owner: Union Ferry Company (1862); United States Navy (1862–65); Long Island Rail Road (1865–68)
- Operator: See owners
- Christened: Fort Henry
- Completed: 1862
- Acquired: (by USN): 25 March 1862
- Commissioned: 3 April 1862
- Decommissioned: 8 July 1865
- Renamed: USS Fort Henry (1862); Huntington (1865)
- Stricken: 1865 (est.)
- Identification: Official no. 11460
- Fate: Destroyed by fire at Hunter's Point, 22 February 1868

General characteristics
- Tonnage: 552
- Displacement: 519 tons
- Length: 150 ft 6 in (45.87 m)
- Beam: 32 ft (9.8 m)
- Draft: 11 ft 9 in (3.58 m)
- Installed power: 1-cyl. inclined steam engine (Note: While Fort Henry's engine type is undocumented, its bore and stroke were identical to that of the other five ferries built in 1862 for the Union Ferry Co. (namely America, Union, Hamilton, Whitehall and Somerset), all of which were fitted with inclined engines.); 38-in bore × 10 ft stroke
- Propulsion: sidewheels
- Armament: two 9 in (230 mm) smoothbore guns; four 32-pounder guns

USS Fort Henry was a gunboat which saw service with the Union Navy during the American Civil War. Originally designed as a ferryboat, she was purchased by the Navy before entering commercial service and converted into a fighting vessel. During the war, she took part in the naval blockade of the Confederacy and captured a number of blockade runners. After the war, she was sold to a New York ferry company. Renamed Huntington, she operated for about two years as an East River ferry before being destroyed by fire in 1868.

== Construction and design ==
Fort Henry was originally built in 1861–1862 as a ferryboat, ordered by the Union Ferry Company for service on the East River between Manhattan and Brooklyn. A wooden-hulled sidewheeler, she was named after a Confederate fort on the Tennessee River recently conquered by Union forces.

Fort Henry was 150 feet 6 inches (45.87 m) in length, with a beam of 32 feet (9.8 m) and hold depth of 11 feet 9 inches (3.58 m). She had a registered tonnage of 552, and in naval service, a displacement of 519 long tons. Fort Henry was powered by a single-cylinder inclined steam engine with bore of 38 inches (0.97 m) and stroke of 10 feet (3.0 m), built by Henry Esler & Co. of New York.

Before she could enter commercial service, Fort Henry was purchased by the US Navy on 25 March 1862 for the sum of $69,689.74 (equivalent to $2,190,000 in 2024). After purchase, the Navy converted the vessel into a gunboat, which included fitting her with two 9-inch smoothbore cannon and four 32-pounder guns. On 3 April 1862, she was commissioned as USS Fort Henry, Acting Lieutenant J. C. Walsh in command.

== Service history ==
Assigned to the East Gulf Blockading Squadron, Fort Henry arrived at Key West, Florida, 2 June 1862 for blockade duty in the vicinity of St. George Sound and the Cedar Keys. Highly successful in apprehending blockade runners, she took one sloop in 1862, and in 1863, took four schooners, four sloops, and one smaller craft. In April 1863, with St. Lawrence and Sagamore, she made an expedition to scour the coast between the Suwannee River and Anclote Keys. A sloop was taken off Bayport, Florida, 9 April, where the group engaged an enemy battery and set a schooner aflame with its fire.

On 20 July 1863, Fort Henry sent her launch to reconnoiter the Crystal River, an expedition in which two of her men were killed by fire from the shore.

She sailed north in June 1865, arriving at New York City 19 June, where she was decommissioned 8 July 1865. The following month, Fort Henry along with a number of other decommissioned US Navy ships were put up for auction at New York by Burdett, Jones & Co. On 15 August, Fort Henry was sold for $18,500, and passed into the hands of the Long Island Rail Road.

Renamed Huntington, the vessel entered commercial service as a ferry, operating between Manhattan and Hunter's Point, Queens. While still in this service, she was burned to the waterline at Hunter's Point on 22 February 1868. (Note: Cudahy, probably erroneously, gives the date as the 11th.) Her estimated value at the time of her loss was $55,000, of which $15,000 was covered by insurance.
