= Cidade Dormitório =

Brazilian rock band

- Origin: Aracaju, Sergipe, Brazil
- Genres: Post-punk, psychedelic rock, experimental rock, MPB
- Years active: 2015–present
- Labels: Banana; Before Sunrise
- Members: Yves Deluc; Fabio Aricawa
- Past members: João Mario; Heder Nascimento; Lauro Francis

Cidade Dormitório is a Brazilian rock band formed in 2015 in the state of Sergipe.

== History ==
The band was born of jam sessions in the suburbs of Aracaju (mainly São Cristóvão, at the campus of Federal University of Sergipe). The first inception had Yves Deluc on vocals and guitar, Heder Nascimento on guitar, Lauro Francis on bass and Fabio Aricawa on drums. The three former met after Deluc published some compositions on SoundCloud and was found by the others. As for Aricawa, he was casually discovered by Deluc when he was performing with a Pixies cover band. The members lived in Nossa Senhora do Socorro, a commuter town near Aracaju; hence the band's name, which means commuter town in Portuguese.

In 2015, they released their first single "Barbosa". Later, they took part in Festival DuSol and, in 2017 (on 31 January), they released their debut EP Esperando o Pior, via Banana Records and which song "Setas Azuis" received airplay in Argentina.

On 28 October 2019, they released their debut album Fraternidade-Terror. It was preceded by two singles released in the same year ("Relacionamentos são extremamente complicados e meu cachorro sabe disso" and "Homo Erectus Plus").

On 10 July 2020, they released Verões e Eletrodomésticos, a remix album with tracks from Fraternidade-Terror and Esperando o Pior.

In 2022, reduced to a duo, they released their second album with all new material, RUÍNA ou O começo me distrai, via Before Sunrise Records.

== Members ==
=== Current line-up ===
- Yves Deluc — vocals, guitar
- Fabio Aricawa — backing vocals, drums

=== Former members ===
- João Mario — guitar
- Heder Nascimento — guitar
- Lauro Francis — bass

=== Session members ===
- Alexandre Mesquita — drums (2017)

== Discography ==
=== EPs ===
- Esperando o Pior (2017)

=== Albums ===
- Fraternidade-Terror (2019)
- Verões e Eletrodomésticos (2020)
- RUÍNA ou O começo me distrai (2022)

=== Singles ===
- "Barbosa" (2015)
- "Relacionamentos são extremamente complicados e meu cachorro sabe disso" (2019)
- "Homo Erectus Plus" (2019)
