= List of number-one singles of 2015 (Venezuela) =

This is a list of the Record Report Top 100 number-one singles of 2015. Chart rankings are based on radio play and are issued weekly.

== Number ones by week ==
Week	Issue date	Song	Artist(s)	Ref.
1	January 24	"Gasolina"	Giorgio	
2	January 31	"Me Marchare"	Los Cadillac's featuring Wisin	
3	February 7	"Me Vuelves Loco"	The Boom	
4	February 14	"Te Quiero Asi"	Siete Bonchones featuring Victor Drija	
8	March 21	"De Tu a Tu"	Lasso	
10	April 11	"Como Yo Te Quiero"	El Potro Álvarez featuring Yandel	
