= Ezetaerre =

Spanish hip-hop group

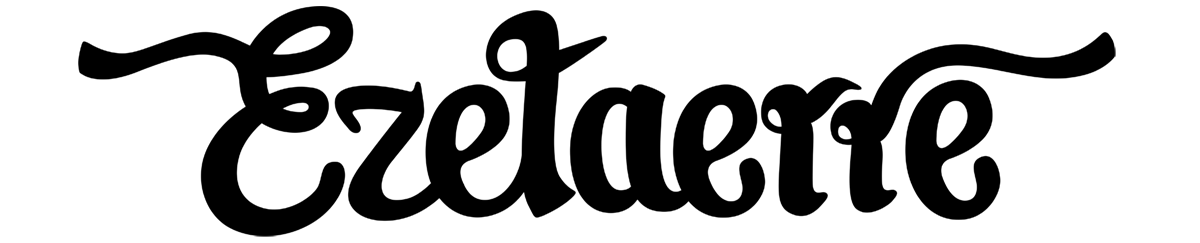

Background information
- Origin: A Coruña.
- Genres: hip hop
- Years active: 2015–present day
- Labels: Santa Guerrilla
- Members: Miguel García (Garchu); Juan Pirola (Pirola); Pedro Iglesias (Petrowski)

Ezetaerre is a Spanish hip hop group formed in A Coruña in 2015, composed of Miguel García (Garchu), Juan Pirola (Pirola) and Pedro Iglesias (Petrowski).

== Career ==
The group was formed in June 2015, when the three members performed a satirical song protesting the merger of different faculties at the University of A Coruña. At the end of that same year, they released the song "Berros do mar", which would later be featured on the group's demo, released in March 2016 and consisting of ten songs.

In May 2016 they won the third annual Revenidas Prize for Emerging Music, which gave them the opportunity to perform live in that year's Revenidas Festival (Vilaxoán de Arousa).

In July of that same year, the group released A herdanza do vento, produced by Iago Pico with a music video filmed by Néboa Films. It was the group's first effort released on the independent record label Santa Guerrilla.

In February 2017, the group produced its first studio album, Aspiracións mínimas e urxentes, an LP composed of 8 songs, produced by Iago Pico at Pousada Son Studios. The day the record was released, the group posted a music video for each song on its YouTube channel, making it the first Galician band to release 8 music videos on the same day.

In November of that year, the band released its EP 100 as an homage to the 100th anniversary of the Russian Revolution. This album, produced by Iago Pico, has collaborations from the bands Satxa and Banda Bassotti.

== Members ==
- Miguel García (Garchu) - rapper
- Juan Pirola (Pirola) - rapper
- Pedro Iglesias (Petrowski) - rapper and producer

== Discography ==
Studio albums

- A herdanza do vento (single) (2016, Santa Guerrilla)
- Aspiracións mínimas e urxentes (2017, Santa Guerrilla)
- Non é verán de Estrella Damm (single) (2017, Santa Guerrilla)
- 100 (2017, Santa Guerrilla)
- Esmorga Inferno (2018, Santa Guerrilla)

Demos

- Demo (self-produced, 2016)
