= Mi Verdad (song) =

Single by Maná featuring Shakira

from the album Cama Incendiada
- Released: 9 February 2015
- Recorded: 2014
- Studio: Criteria Studios (Miami, FL)
- Genre: Latin pop
- Length: 4:32
- Label: Warner Music Mexico
- Composer: Fher Olvera · George Noriega
- Lyricist: Fher Olvera
- Producer: George Noriega

Maná singles chronology
"Penélope" (2012)	"Mi Verdad" (2015)	"La Prisión" (2015)

Shakira singles chronology
"Dare (La La La)" (2014)	"Mi Verdad" (2015)	"Try Everything" (2016)

Music video
- "Mi Verdad" on YouTube

"Mi Verdad" (transl. "My Truth") is a song by Mexican band Maná featuring Colombian singer-songwriter Shakira. It was released on 9 February 2015 by the Mexican division of Warner Music Group, as the lead single from Maná's ninth studio album Cama Incendiada.

The song is the main theme of the Mexican 2016 telenovela Sueño de amor.

== Track listing ==
- Digital download
1. "Mi Verdad (feat. Shakira)" - 4:32

== Charts ==
=== Weekly charts ===
Weekly chart performance for "Mi Verdad"
Chart (2015)	Peak position
Colombia (National-Report)	5
Colombia (Monitor Latino)	8
Dominican Republic Pop (Monitor Latino)	1
Mexico (Billboard Mexican Airplay)	5
Spain (Promusicae)	20
US Bubbling Under Hot 100 (Billboard)	19
US Hot Latin Songs (Billboard)	1
US Latin Airplay (Billboard)	1

=== Year-end charts ===
Year-end chart performance for "Mi Verdad"
Chart (2015)	Position
Spain (PROMUSICAE)	57
US Hot Latin Songs (Billboard)	14

== Certifications ==
Certifications for "Mi Verdad"
Region	Certification	Certified units/sales
Mexico (AMPROFON)	Gold	30,000^{*}
Spain (Promusicae)	2× Platinum	120,000^{‡}
United States (RIAA)	5× Platinum (Latin)	300,000^{‡}
^{*} Sales figures based on certification alone.^{‡} Sales+streaming figures based on certification alone.

== See also ==
- List of number-one Billboard Hot Latin Songs of 2015
