= Cama Incendiada =

Studio album by Maná
- Released: April 21, 2015
- Recorded: June 30, 2014 – January 7, 2015
- Genre: Pop rock
- Label: Warner Music Mexico
- Producers: George Noriega, Maná

Maná chronology
Exiliados en la Bahía: Lo Mejor de Maná (2012)	Cama Incendiada (2015)	El Gladiador Mexicano (2018)

Singles from Cama Incendiada
- 1. "Mi Verdad" Released: February 9, 2015; 2. "La Prisión" Released: April 20, 2015; 3. "Ironía" Released: September 21, 2015; 4. "Adicto a Tu Amor" Released: May 20, 2016

"Cama Incendiada" (Burning Bed) is the ninth studio album released by Maná on April 21, 2015.

== Track listing ==
No.	Title	Lyrics	Music	Length
1.	"Adicto a Tu Amor"	Fher Olvera	Fher Olvera · George Noriega	4:04
2.	"La Cama Incendiada"	Olvera	Olvera · Noriega	4:36
3.	"La Prisión"	Olvera	Olvera · Noriega	4:18
4.	"Ironía"	Olvera	Olvera · Noriega	5:16
5.	"Peligrosa"	Sergio Vallín	Vallín	3:45
6.	"Mi Verdad" (featuring Shakira)	Olvera	Olvera · Noriega	4:32
7.	"Suavecito"	Olvera	Olvera · Noriega	5:08
8.	"La Telaraña"	Olvera	Olvera · Noriega	4:25
9.	"Electrizado"	Olvera	Álex González	3:33
10.	"Somos Más Americanos"	Enrique M. Valencia	Valencia	3:48
11.	"La Telaraña (Remix)"	Olvera	Olvera · Noriega	4:22

== Charts ==
=== Weekly charts ===
Chart (2015)	Peak position
Argentinian Albums (CAPIF)	1
Mexican Albums (Top 100 Mexico)	2
Spanish Albums (Promusicae)	1
South American Albums (Prensario)	16
Swiss Albums (Schweizer Hitparade)	72
Uruguayan Albums (CUD)	4
US Billboard 200	15
US Top Latin Albums (Billboard)	1
US Latin Pop Albums (Billboard)	1

=== Year-end charts ===
Chart (2015)	Position
Spanish Albums (PROMUSICAE)	24
US Top Latin Albums (Billboard)	4

== Certifications ==
Region	Certification	Certified units/sales
Chile (IFPI)	Gold	
Mexico (AMPROFON)	Gold	30,000^{^}
Spain (Promusicae)	Gold	20,000^{‡}
United States (RIAA)	Platinum (Latin)	60,000^{^}
^{^} Shipments figures based on certification alone.^{‡} Sales+streaming figures based on certification alone.

== See also ==
- List of number-one Billboard Latin Albums from the 2010s
- List of number-one albums of 2015 (Spain)
