= Deny e Dino =

Brazilian rock band

- Origin: Santos, Brazil
- Years active: 1956–1994
- Past members: Deny, Dino (1956–1994)

Deny e Dino is a Brazilian rock band formed in the city of Santos in 1956. They achieved mainstream success with their Jovem Guarda hit "Coruja" (translated as owl). They were among the artists associated with the television program Jovem Guarda, alongside performers including Roberto Carlos, Erasmo Carlos and Wanderléa. They co-wrote songs for other Jovem Guarda artists, like Demétrius ("Comendador Mesquita") and Erasmo Carlos ("Eu Não Me Importo"). Their album O Ciúme sold 200,000 copies and stayed at first place on the charts for 22 weeks. They still had some success after the end of Jovem Guarda. Dino died in 1994, but Deny kept producing and recording, and released a new album, Essential, with another partner who adopted the stage name Dino.
