= Steve Vibert Pouchie =

American vibraphone player

Steve Vibert Pouchie was a Bronx Latin Jazz vibraphonist born on January 18, 1954. He died on August 28, 2015.

After graduating from Bard College in 1976 Pouchie worked as a teacher in the Bronx at Walton High School until 2004.

Pouchie was awarded the New York Post "Liberty Medal" presented to him by New York City Mayor Michael Bloomberg for his works as an outstanding innovative musical educator.

Despite his educational demands, Pouchie formed a Latin Jazz ensemble to promote that form of music. He played and opened for Tito Puente, Charlie Palmieri, Jimmy Sabater, Dave Valentin and Bobby Sanabria.

Pouchie also produced and directed the Latin Jazz television show "Latin Jazz Alive and Kickin" for many years. In 2002 Pouchie released his first CD "Vibe Mania" and in 2015 he released his final CD, titled "North by Northwest" which included Grammy nominated Wilson "Chembo" Corniel on congas and percussion.

On August 13, 2015, Steve Pouchie's Latin Jazz Ensemble performed their last "Hotel Beach Concert" at The Claridge Hotel in Atlantic City, New Jersey. The concert was in connection with Atlantic City's Chicken Bone Beach Historical Society.

Pouchie died shortly after and was buried on September 4, 2015 at the Saint Raymond's Cemetery in the Bronx.
