= Continental Records =

American record company

- Founded: 1942
- Founder: Donald H. Gabor
- Status: Defunct
- Genre: Jazz, blues, classical
- Country of origin: U.S.

Continental Records was a record company founded by Donald H. Gabor in 1942 producing and releasing jazz, blues and classical music. Its catalogue included issues by Cozy Cole, Edmond Hall, Sabby Lewis, Slam Stewart, Mary Lou Williams, Rubberlegs Williams, Ethel Waters, and classical artists Georges Enesco, Béla Bartók, and Andor Foldes. The label's name was revived briefly in the 1960s.

== See also ==
- List of record labels
