= Tic, Tic Tac =

Single by Carrapicho

from the album Festa do Boi Bumba
- B-side: "E' O Sol Adormesce"
- Released: June 1996
- Genre: Latin; dance
- Length: 3:16
- Label: Arista; BMG
- Songwriter: Braulino Lima
- Producer: Patrick Bruel

Alternative cover
- Chilli featuring Carrapicho

"Tic, Tic Tac" is a song by Brazilian band Carrapicho. It was released in June 1996, by Arista Records and BMG, as the lead single from their eleventh album, Festa do Boi Bumba (1996), which was later certified platinum disc in France. The song is written by Braulino Lima and produced by Patrick Bruel. It was also recorded by Chilli featuring Carrapicho and released in May 1997. The original version charted in Belgium, Estonia, France, Israel, Latvia, the Netherlands and Spain. The remixed version, produced by Frank Farian, charted in Austria, Canada, Germany, Norway, Portugal, Sweden, Switzerland, and the United Kingdom. Russian singer Murat Nasyrov performed his cover with other lyrics "The Boy Wants [to Go] to Tambov" (Russian: "Мальчик хочет в Тамбов") in 1997.

== Background and releases ==
It was a song originally produced for the Folkloric Festival of Parintins in 1992, in Brazil, exalting the greatness and strength of the Amazon River. In the middle of 1994 a musical group from the Amazon region called Carrapicho recorded the music in solo version and was later discovered by the French singer Patrick Bruel who participated in the production and dissemination in his home country. The song was sponsored by TF1 in France and became one of the major summer hits. In the music video, the band sing "Tic, Tic Tac" on a boat while performing a group choreography.

The original version even topped the chart in France for three weeks, becoming at the time one of the first two singles certified Diamond. In late 1996, French TV host Sophie Favier covered the song in French-language with other lyrics under the title "Il me tape sur les nerfs...". Her version peaked at #31 in France and #16 in Belgium (Wallonia).

In 1997, the song was covered by Fruit De La Passion, and in the same year the song finally became a success in Brazil, its country of origin. In the same year, the song was covered using original lyrics and released as a single by singer Murat Nasyrov, titled Mal'chik hochet v Tambov (The Boy Wants to go to Tambov). His version became a massive hit in Russia and received a Golden Gramophone Award in 1997.

In Brazil, the song was performed for the first time in 1996 on a national network on the Domingo Legal (SBT) program, under the presentation of Augusto Liberato (Gugu), who invited the group to perform on their program after having heard and verified the success of the group in Europe when traveling on vacation.

== Critical reception ==
Alex Bellos from The Guardian commented, "This year the track nominated by the brightest brains in the European music industry to make the most Britons dance like chickens reliving their sleaziest holiday memories is called 'Tic, Tic Tac'. If you travelled to any tacky tourist zone this summer, or anywhere in Latin America, you will probably already be seeking aversion therapy to stop this mantra going through your mind: 'Baji baji tambo, chicachicachicachica'. The actual words are the Brazilian 'Bate forte o tambor, Eu quero é tic tic tic, tac' but that's not really the point." Alan Jackson from The Times noted, "Apparently summer is incomplete without a Euro-hit imported by nostalgic package holidaymakers. Here it is."

Pan-European magazine Music & Media wrote, "If a track's worth can be judged by the number of covers which appear in its wake, then 'Tic, Tic Tac' is a monster. Various "versions" have been spotted in Spain and Italy, where the track has already been widely compiled and is enjoying serious airplay. But even the original track is not really the original... Carrapicho's first recording of 'Tic, Tic Tac' was released in 1995 by RCA in Brazil, where it went on to sell a respectable 500,000 units. That version was released across Europe via France last year, but failed to live up to BMG's hopes that it would become another 'Lambada'/'Macarena' sensation. 1997's version, featuring Chilli, is altogether more "Europeanised" and is currently collecting airplay in the Netherlands and Germany. The track has also been warmly received by two of Spain's major radio networks, Los 40 Principales and Cadena 100, both of whom have declared it "the song of the summer." Somewhat predictably, the only European territory not intending to release 'Tic, Tic Tac' is the U.K, despite the fact that, like 'Macarena', it's more than just a song, with its own easy-to follow dance routine and a devilishly catchy chorus."

== Track listings ==
- 12" single
1. "Tic, Tic Tac" (Club Mix) — 4:45
2. "Tic, Tic Tac" (Single Edit) — 3:16
- 2 x 12" maxi
1. "Tic, Tic Tac" (Rosabel Tiki-Tiki Dub) — 11:41 (remixed by Rosabel (Ralphi Rosario-Abel Aguilera))
2. "Tic, Tic Tac" (Rosabel House Mix) — 8:41 (remixed by Rosabel (Ralphi Rosario-Abel Aguilera))
3. "Tic, Tic Tac" (Mardi Gras Cha Cha Mix) — 7:07 (remixed by Rosabel (Ralphi Rosario-Abel Aguilera))
4. "Tic, Tic Tac" (Bang Da Drum Mix) — 7:00 (remixed by Victor Calderone)
5. "Tic, Tic Tac" (Bang Da Drum Dub) — 7:00 (remixed by Victor Calderone)
6. "Tic, Tic Tac" (Play Hard House Mix) — 6:14 (remixed by Moncho Tamares)
7. "Tic, Tic Tac" (Batucada HNRG Mix) — 4:30 (remixed by Moncho Tamares)
- CD single
1. "Tic, Tic Tac" — 3:16
2. "E' O Sol Adormece" — 2:17
- CD single
1. "Tic, Tic Tac" (Radio Edit 1) Chilli featuring Carrapicho — 3:45
2. "Tic, Tic Tac" (Radio Edit 2) Carrapicho featuring Chilli — 3:45
- CD single
1. "Tic, Tic Tac" (Radio Edit 1) Chilli featuring Carrapicho — 3:45
2. "Tic, Tic Tac" (Radio Edit 2) Carrapicho featuring Chilli — 3:45
3. "Tic, Tic Tac" (Club Mix) Chilli featuring Carrapicho — 6:50
4. "Tic, Tic Tac" (Copacabana Drive mix) Carrapicho featuring Chilli — 6:46

== Charts ==
=== Weekly charts ===
Chart (1996)	Peak position
Belgium (Ultratop 50 Flanders)	6
Belgium (Ultratop 50 Wallonia)	2
Estonia (Eesti Top 20)	18
France (SNEP)	1
Israel (Israeli Singles Chart)	10
Latvia (Latvijas Top 50)	4
Netherlands (Dutch Top 40 Tipparade)	2
Netherlands (Single Top 100)	47
Spain (Promusicae)	3

Chart (1997) ^{1}	Peak position
Austria (Ö3 Austria Top 40)	2
Canada (Nielsen SoundScan)	14
Europe (Eurochart Hot 100)	12
Germany (GfK)	5
Iceland (Íslenski Listinn Topp 40)	23
Netherlands (Dutch Top 40)	25
Netherlands (Single Top 100)	31
Norway (VG-lista)	4
Scotland (OCC)	60
Spain (AFYVE)	3
Sweden (Sverigetopplistan)	24
Switzerland (Schweizer Hitparade)	6
UK Singles (OCC)	59
US Hot Dance Club Play (Billboard)	8

^{1} Chilli featuring Carrapicho

=== Year-end charts ===
Chart (1996)	Position
Belgium (Ultratop 50 Flanders)	52
Belgium (Ultratop 50 Wallonia)	10
Europe (Eurochart Hot 100)	37
France (SNEP)	2
Israel (Israeli Singles Chart)	41
Latvia (Latvijas Top 50)	60

Chart (1997)	Position
Austria (Ö3 Austria Top 40)	13
Europe (Eurochart Hot 100)	85
Germany (Official German Charts)	31
Switzerland (Schweizer Hitparade)	37

== Certifications ==
Region	Certification	Certified units/sales
Austria (IFPI Austria)	Gold	25,000^{*}
France (SNEP)	Diamond	750,000^{*}
Germany (BVMI)	Gold	250,000^{^}
Norway (IFPI Norway) Chilli feat. Carrapicho	Gold	
^{*} Sales figures based on certification alone.^{^} Shipments figures based on certification alone.
