= Ronnie Cord =

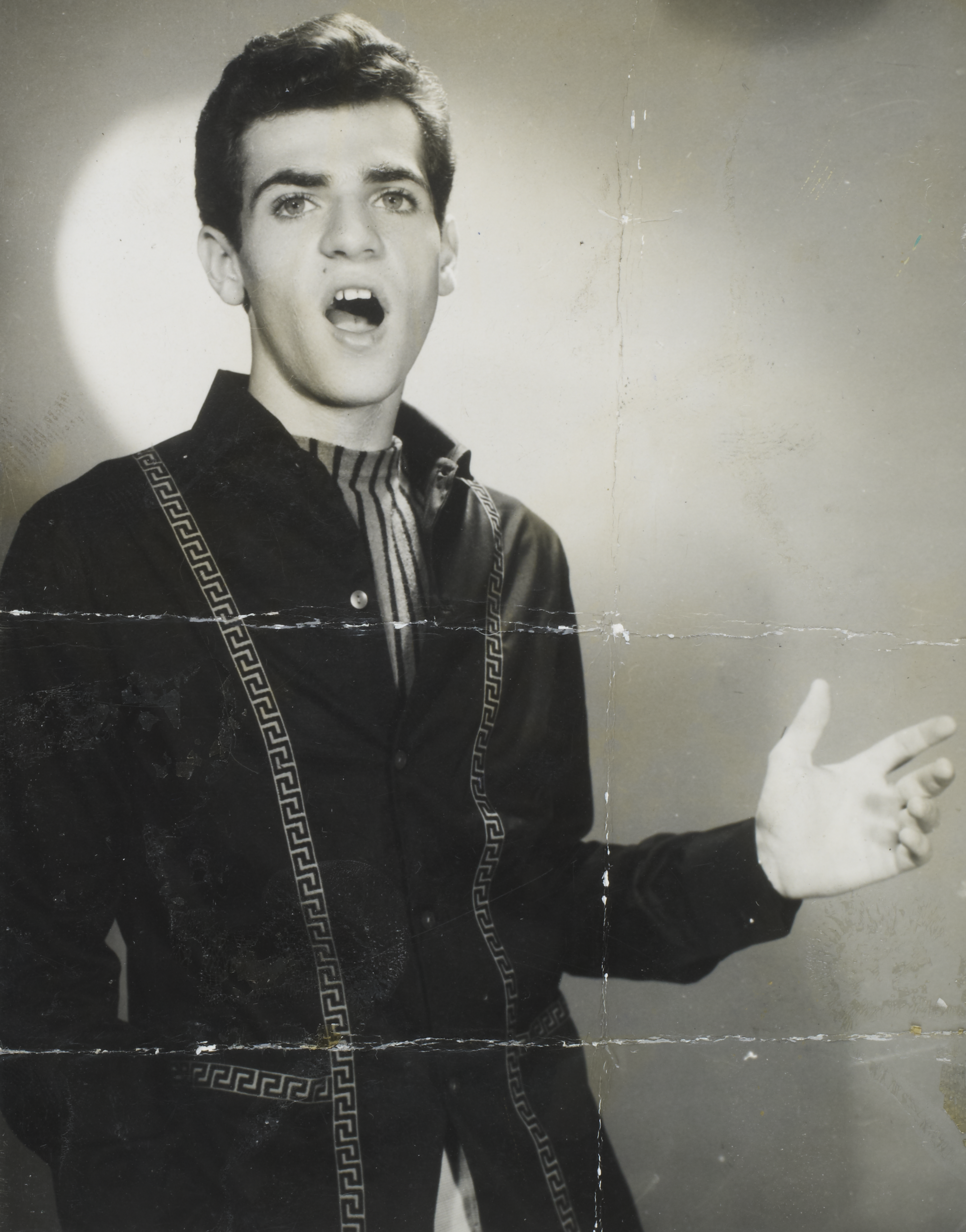
- Ronnie Cord in 1960

Background information
- Born: Ronald Cordovil; January 22, 1943; Manhuaçu, Brazil
- Died: January 6, 1986 (aged 42) São Paulo, Brazil
- Years active: 1960-1986
- Label: RCA Victor

Ronnie Cord (born Ronald Cordovil; January 22, 1943 in Manhuaçu – January 6, 1986 in São Paulo) was a Brazilian singer. Son of conductor and composer Hervé Cordovil, he already played the guitar at age six. In 1959 he auditioned for Copacabana Records in Rio de Janeiro. In 1960, the following year, he made his first recording, released on long-playing records that brought together several other singers. His biggest hit was the song "Rua Augusta", released by RCA Victor in 1963. In 1965, he was very successful with a version of "Itsy Bitsy Teenie Weenie Yellow Polkadot Bikini" recorded at RCA Victor in 1964. He died in 1986, leaving three children.
