= Parintins =

Municipality of Amazonas, Brazil

- Municipality
- Municipality of Parintins
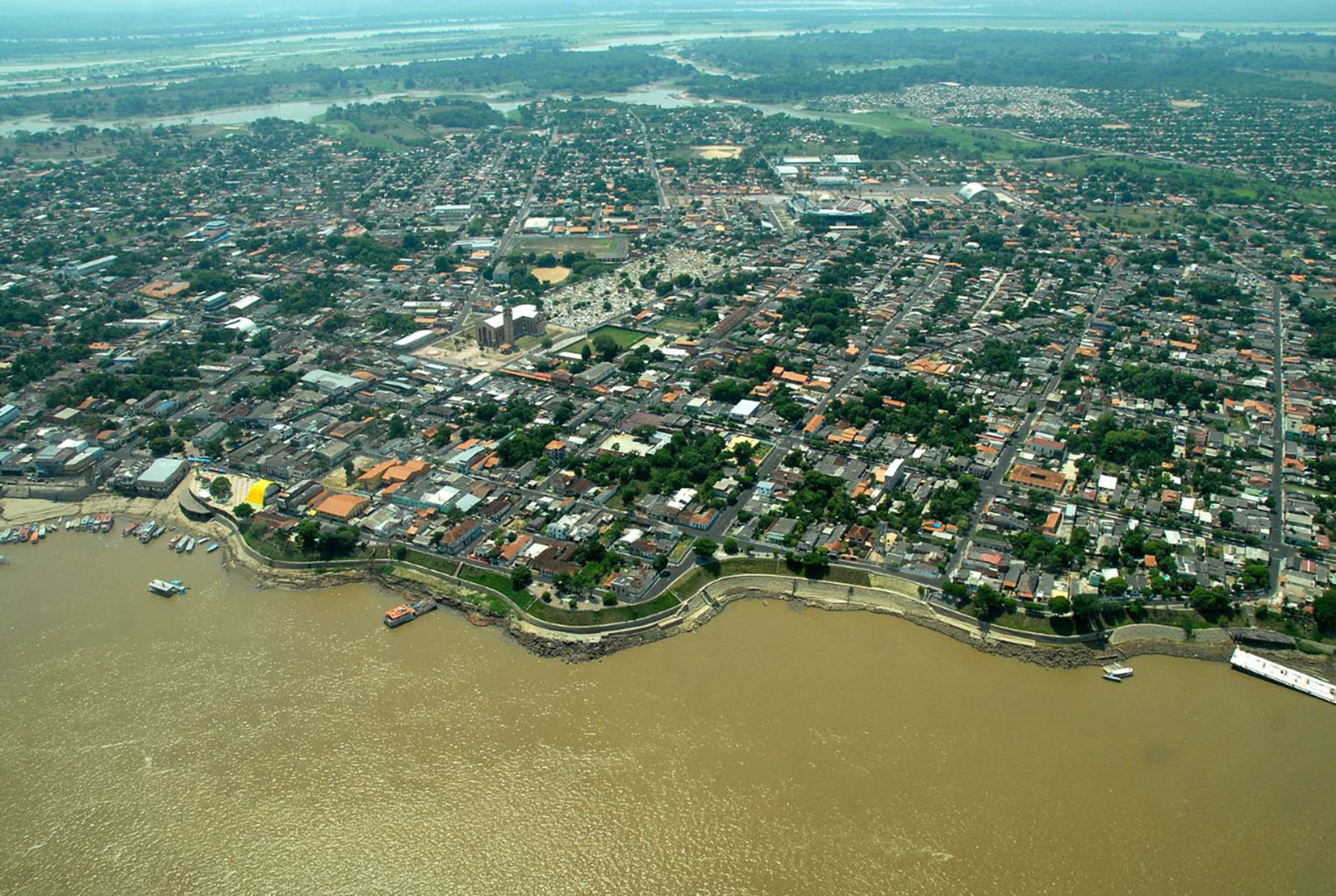
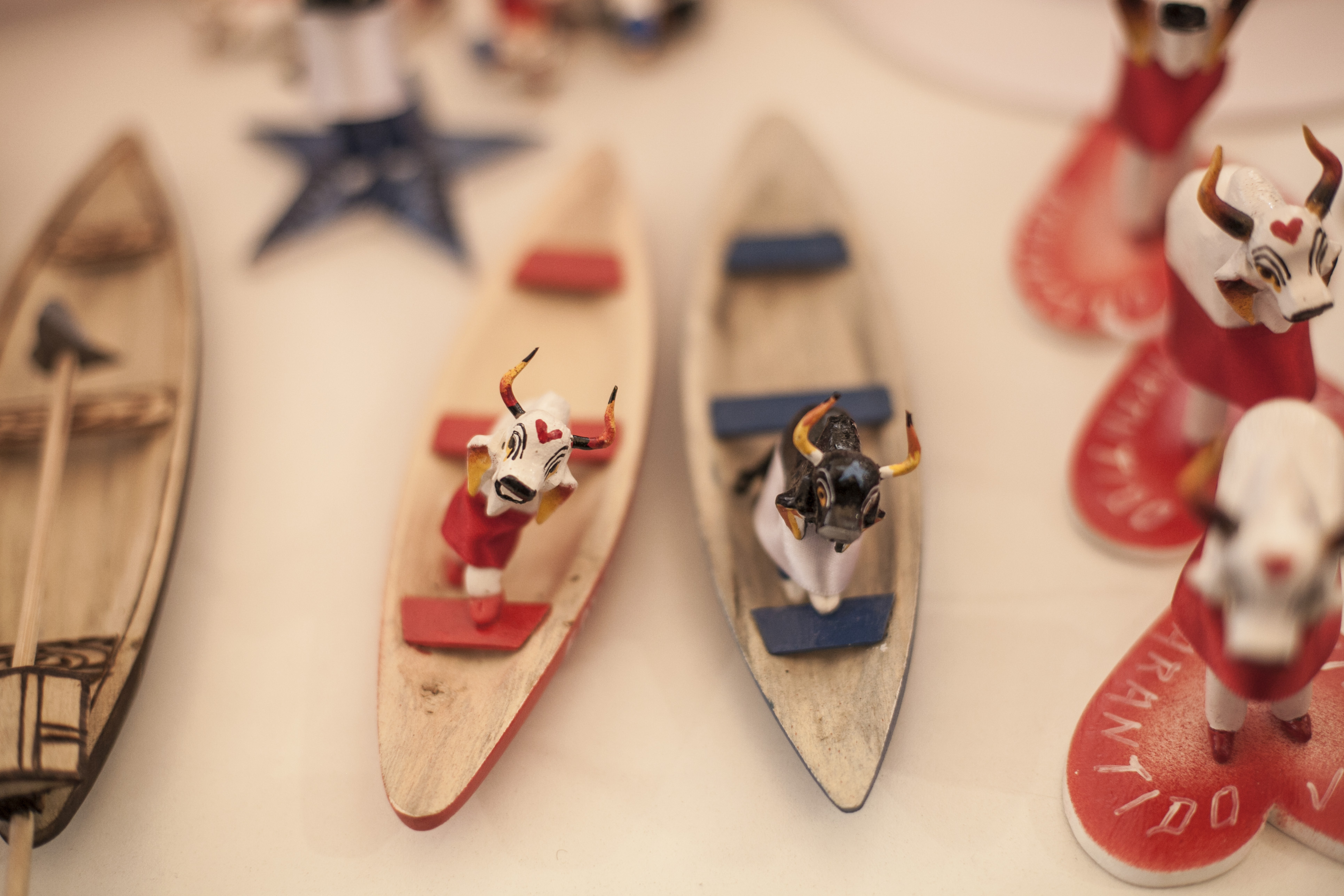
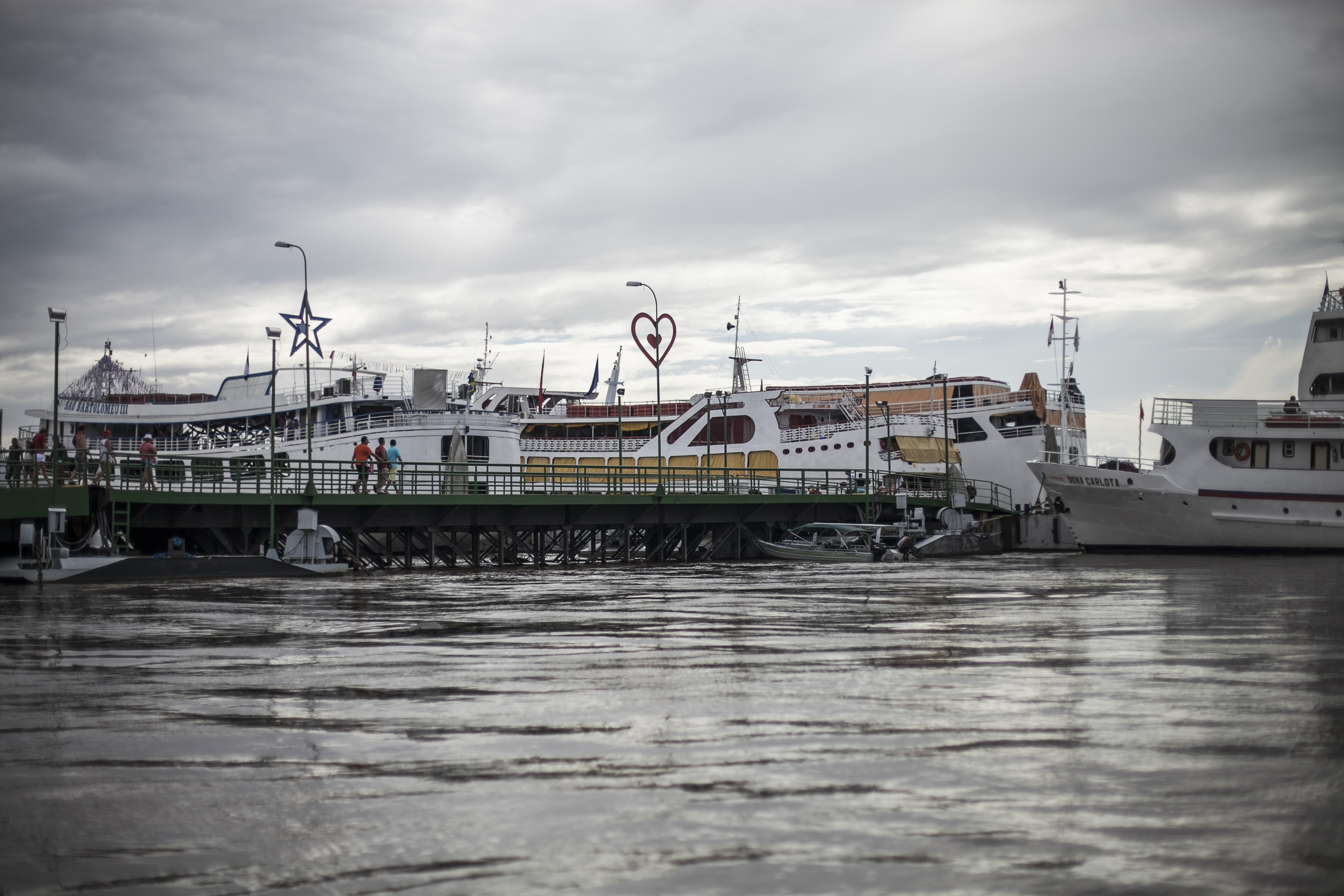
- Clockwise: Aerial view of Parintins ; Bulls Garantido (red) and Caprichoso (blue), main characters of Parintins folklore; River port of city.

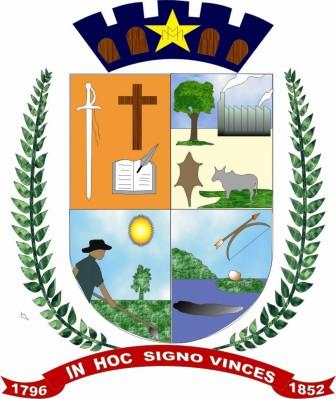
- Flag Coat of arms
- Nickname: Capital Mundial do Folclore (Folklore Capital of the World in Portuguese)
- Location in Amazonas

- Location in Brazil
- Coordinates: 02°37′40″S 56°44′09″W
- Country: Brazil
- Region: North
- State: Amazonas
- Founded: 15 October 1852; 174 years ago

Government
  - Mayor: Frank Luiz da Cunha Garcia (PSDB)

Area
  - Total: 5,952.333 km^{2} (2,298.209 sq mi)
- Elevation: 27 m (89 ft)

Population (2022 Census)
  - Total: 96,372
  - Estimate (2025): 101,855
  - Density: 16.191/km^{2} (41.934/sq mi)
- Time zone: UTC−4 (AMT)
- Postal code: 69150-000
- Area code: +55 92
- Demonym: parintinense

Parintins is a municipality in the far east of the Amazonas state of Brazil. It is part of a microregion also named Parintins. The population for the entire municipality was 96,372 (2022 Census) and its area is 6,044 km^{2}. It is the second-largest city in Amazonas. The city is located on Tupinambarana island in the Amazon River. Parintins is known for the Parintins Folklore Festival, a popular festival held there each June and depicting Boi-Bumbá. It was also the site of an experimental deployment of WiMAX, sponsored by Intel, in late 2006.

== History ==
Parintins, like nearly all other Brazilian municipalities, was originally inhabited by indigenous peoples. Its discovery occurred in 1749 when going down the Amazon River, the exploiter José Gonçalves da Fonseca, noticed an island which, by extension excelled located on the right bank of the big river Amazon. The foundation of the town was only held in 1796, by José Pedro Cordovil, who came with his slaves and aggregates to concentrate on fishing arapaima and agriculture, calling the Tupinambarana. Queen Maria First gave him the island as a gift. Fixed, he founded a cocoa tree farm, dedicated to the farming of that product on a large scale. To get out of there, some time later, offered the island to the queen. Tupinambarana was accepted and elevated to the religious mission, in 1803, by Captain-mor of Pará, the Count of Arcos, who has directed mission of the Friar José das Chagas, receiving the title of Vila Nova da Rainha. Efficient performance of José provoked a surge of progress and development in the town, by the organization of the region of the upper Amazon. In July 1833 the village was transformed into a parish, with the name of the parish of Nossa Senhora do Carmo of Tupinambarana. Was still a simple parish when started a revolution in Grão-Pará, and spread throughout the province amazonian. The Vicar, father Antônio de Souza Neto, it's had outstanding performance during the sedition, served as a delegate against the revolutionaries in the lower Amazon River. Parintins maybe because was well defended, was spared the attacks of the night. On 24 October 1848, by the provincial law of Great-Para n° 146, elevated the town to the category of the village, with the name of Vila Bela Imperatriz, and constituted in the municipality until then connected the Maués. On 15 October 1852, now in the province of Amazonas, by provincial law number two confirmed the creation of the municipality. Official on 14 March 1853 the installation of the city renamed for Parintins in 1880, honoring to the name of the tribe that inhabited the place before your foundation.

== Geography ==
Municipality of Parintins is located in the state of Amazonas, is the second largest city in the state in numbers of inhabitants after Manaus, their distance is 369 km (229.28 mi) from the capital of Amazonas and 1757.62 km (109,213.44 mi) in straight line from Brasilia, the municipality is famous within Brazil due to the folk festival which takes place in June each year in town showing a bit of the indigenous Amazonian handicraft in your presentations, is located on the right bank of the Amazon River, in addition to serving as a trading post for the disposal of agricultural production of the Madeira River ongoing for to the Atlantic Ocean. There are two important district for city, the District of Mocambo and the District of Vila Amazonia.

=== Climate ===
Climate is tropical rainforest climate, isothermal (type Af i, according to Köppen), with the driest quarter in July to September (268 millimeters). The average annual temperature is 27.2 °C (80.96 °F) with the maximum thermal average 31.7 °C (89.06 °F) and the minimum average 24.3 °C (75.74 °F). The hottest month is October, which has an average temperature of 28.5 °C (83.3 °F), and, this month, the average of 33.7 °C (92.66 °F) maximum and minimum 24.7 °C (76.46 °F). The relative humidity is 83.5%, with an annual rainfall of 2302.2 millimeters (mm), with March the most precipitation (324.2 mm), annual insolation of 2 200 hours with a major record in the month of August. According to data from the National Institute of meteorology (INMET), for the period of 1967 to 1990 and from 1993, the lowest temperature recorded in Parintins was 12.9 °C (55.22 °F) on 2 January 1975 and the biggest hit 39 degrees Celsius on 7 January 1998. The highest accumulated rainfall in 24 hours was 173 mm on 29 November 1972. In March 1999 it was observed the greatest total volume of rain accumulated in a month of 773.3 mm, followed by 709.2 mm in January 2013.

Climate data for Parintins (1981–2010, extremes 1912–present)
Month	Jan	Feb	Mar	Apr	May	Jun	Jul	Aug	Sep	Oct	Nov	Dec	Year
Record high °C (°F)	39.0 (102.2)	35.8 (96.4)	35.9 (96.6)	35.2 (95.4)	36.2 (97.2)	36.5 (97.7)	37.3 (99.1)	36.4 (97.5)	37.6 (99.7)	38.2 (100.8)	37.8 (100.0)	37.4 (99.3)	39.0 (102.2)
Mean daily maximum °C (°F)	31.3 (88.3)	31.0 (87.8)	31.1 (88.0)	31.2 (88.2)	31.3 (88.3)	31.9 (89.4)	32.2 (90.0)	33.4 (92.1)	34.3 (93.7)	34.4 (93.9)	33.6 (92.5)	32.5 (90.5)	32.4 (90.3)
Daily mean °C (°F)	27.0 (80.6)	26.8 (80.2)	26.9 (80.4)	27.0 (80.6)	27.1 (80.8)	27.3 (81.1)	27.2 (81.0)	28.3 (82.9)	28.9 (84.0)	29.1 (84.4)	28.6 (83.5)	27.9 (82.2)	27.7 (81.9)
Mean daily minimum °C (°F)	24.1 (75.4)	23.9 (75.0)	24.0 (75.2)	24.2 (75.6)	24.3 (75.7)	24.2 (75.6)	24.1 (75.4)	24.7 (76.5)	25.1 (77.2)	25.1 (77.2)	24.9 (76.8)	24.6 (76.3)	24.4 (75.9)
Record low °C (°F)	21.9 (71.4)	20.9 (69.6)	21.0 (69.8)	21.4 (70.5)	21.0 (69.8)	20.6 (69.1)	19.0 (66.2)	14.6 (58.3)	21.5 (70.7)	21.0 (69.8)	20.9 (69.6)	20.7 (69.3)	14.6 (58.3)
Average precipitation mm (inches)	292.7 (11.52)	335.6 (13.21)	363.6 (14.31)	346.0 (13.62)	281.1 (11.07)	186.4 (7.34)	149.9 (5.90)	73.8 (2.91)	63.1 (2.48)	76.7 (3.02)	116.3 (4.58)	189.7 (7.47)	2,474.9 (97.44)
Average precipitation days (≥ 1.0 mm)	17	18	19	18	20	17	14	8	6	6	7	11	161
Average relative humidity (%)	84.6	85.3	85.9	86.3	85.9	83.9	81.6	77.5	74.1	73.1	76.4	79.5	81.2
Mean monthly sunshine hours	137.3	111.3	121.9	126.5	154.8	198.2	231.4	261.1	238.5	220.0	179.2	164.4	2,144.6
Source 1: Instituto Nacional de Meteorologia
Source 2: Meteo Climat (record highs and lows)

== Transportation ==
It is served by Júlio Belém Airport.

== Notable residents ==
- Elaíze Farias, journalist
