= Parintins Airport =

Júlio Belém Airport Aeroporto Júlio Belém
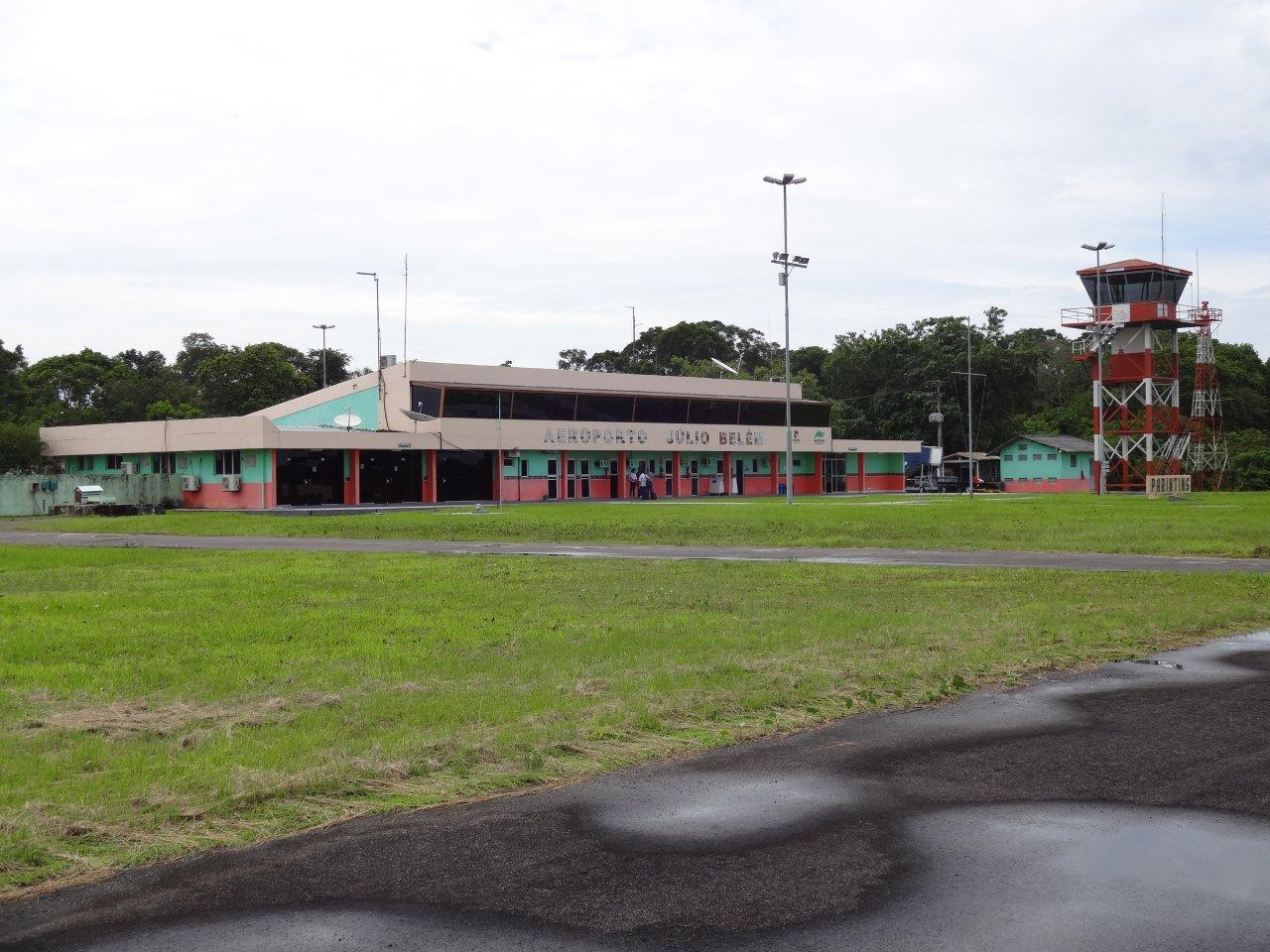
- Apron view of the terminal
- IATA: PIN; ICAO: SWPI; LID: AM0006

Summary
- Airport type: Public
- Owner/Operator: Parintins
- Serves: Parintins
- Opened: 20 September 1982; 43 years ago
- Time zone: BRT−1 (UTC−04:00)
- Elevation AMSL: 25 m (82 ft)
- Coordinates: 02°40′25″S 056°46′39″W

Map
- Location in Brazil

Runways
Direction	Length		Surface
Direction	m	ft	Surface
06/24	1,801	5,909	Asphalt
- Sources: ANAC, DECEA

Júlio Belém Airport (IATA: PIN, ICAO: SWPI) is the airport serving Parintins, Brazil. It is named after Júlio Furtado Belém (1911–1971), a local politician and member of the Amazonas State Assembly.

It is operated by the municipality of Parintins.

== History ==
The airport was inaugurated on September 20, 1982 as a replacement to an older facility located closer to the city center, in the neighborhood of Palmares. The area is now the site of the Bumbódromo.

Every June, during the Parintins Folklore Festival, its traffic is greatly increased by charter and extra flights. In 2024, in twelve days and with the help of the Brazilian Air Force, Parintins air traffic control handled 980 operations with an all-time peak of 172 movements on July 1, 2024.

== Airlines and destinations ==
Airlines	Destinations
Azul Brazilian Airlines	Manaus

== Access ==
The airport is located 5 km (3 mi) from downtown Parintins.

== See also ==
- List of airports in Brazil
