= Parintins Folklore Festival =

Festival in Parintins

- Genre: Boi-Bumbá
- Dates: Last weekend of June
- Locations: Parintins, Amazonas, Brazil
- Years active: 1965–present
- Website: www.festivaldeparintins.com.br

Parintins Folklore Festival (Portuguese: Festival Folclórico de Parintins), also known as the Parintins Festival (Portuguese: Festival de Parintins), is an annual Brazilian folk festival held in Parintins, Amazonas in Brazil. Usually staged over three nights during the last weekend of June, it centres on competitive performances by the boi-bumbá associations Boi Garantido and Boi Caprichoso.

The festival adapts elements of the Bumba-meu-boi tradition, especially the story of the death and resurrection of a bull, into large-scale arena spectacles. Caprichoso, whose colours are blue and white, and Garantido, whose colours are red and white. present themed productions combining toadas (songs), percussion, dance, theatrical narrative, costumes, scenery, Amazonian legends, and references to Indigenous cultures.

The performances take place at the Parintins Cultural Centre, popularly known as the Bumbódromo. The festival's competitive format includes individual and collective performance items, as well as scenic and musical elements, evaluated under the event's regulations.

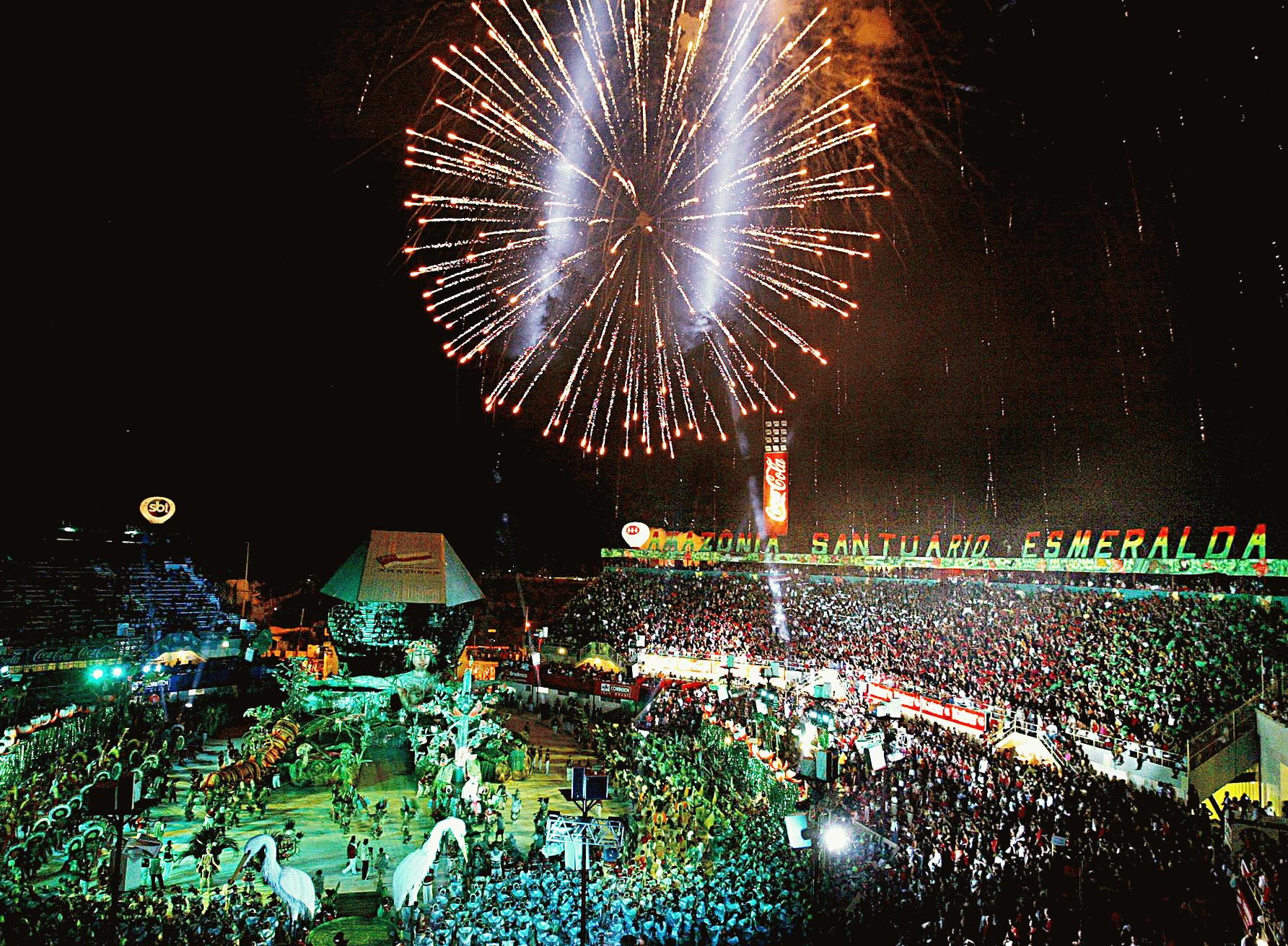
Presentation at the festival in June 2003

The boi-bumbá cultural complex of Médio Amazonas and Parintins, which includes the arena form associated with the festival, was recognised as Brazilian cultural heritage in 2018.

== National and international visibility ==
Despite its importance to the cultural identity of Amazonas, the Parintins Folklore Festival remained relatively little known outside the region for much of the 20th century. Its national visibility increased substantially during the 1990s, particularly following the success of the Amazonian music group Carrapicho and its 1996 hit Tic, Tic Tac, which incorporated musical elements associated with the festival and helped bring the rhythms of Parintins to audiences across Brazil.

The festival has also contributed songs that became widely associated with the culture of the two bois, including Vermelho, performed by Fafá de Belém, and Parintins Para o Mundo Ver. Through music, television broadcasts and the growing tourism industry surrounding the event, Parintins became increasingly recognized beyond Amazonas as a major center of Brazilian popular and folkloric culture.

The rivalry between the two bois also has an unusual effect on commercial branding in Parintins. During the festival period, businesses and national brands frequently adapt their visual identities to the colors associated with the competing associations: blue for Caprichoso and red for Garantido. This practice is particularly visible in the case of Coca-Cola, whose standard corporate color is red.

Coca-Cola has become a well-known example of this local adaptation. During the festival, the brand has produced and displayed special materials and packaging in both red and blue, corresponding to the two bois. In Parintins, Coca-Cola's branding can consequently appear in blue in locations associated with Caprichoso, a striking departure from the company's conventional global visual identity. Special festival editions have also combined the two colors or been produced in separate versions representing each side of the rivalry.

The phenomenon has become part of the festival's international cultural image and illustrates the extent to which the Caprichoso–Garantido rivalry influences commercial as well as artistic life in Parintins. Rather than representing a permanent change to Coca-Cola's global branding, the blue Coca-Cola imagery is a localized adaptation to the cultural context of the festival.

== History ==
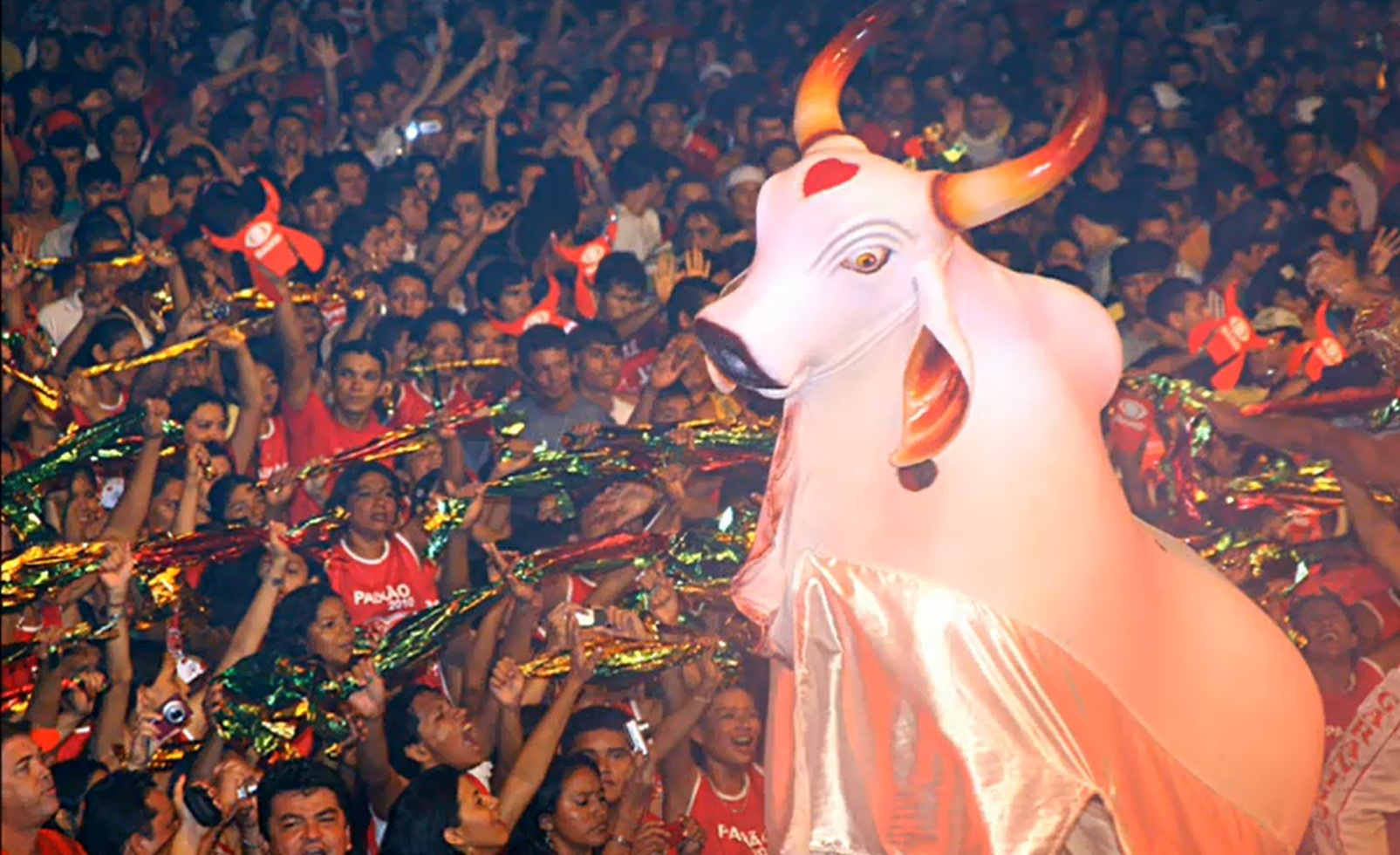
Boi Garantido, identified by its red-and-white colours and the red heart on its forehead.

In Parintins, groups known as bois (bulls) had performed forms of Bumba meu boi since the early 20th century. These groups were smaller and less formally organised than the later festival associations, and documentation from the period is limited. Garantido and Caprichoso had developed a local rivalry before the creation of the festival, alongside other groups, including Diamantino, Ramalhete, Fita Verde, Corre-Campo, Mina de Ouro, Galante and Campineiro.

The first Parintins Folklore Festival was held in 1965. It was organised by young people associated with Juventude Alegre Católica (JAC) to raise funds for the construction of the Cathedral of Our Lady of Mount Carmel, the patron saint of Parintins. The event was initially organised as a June festival involving several folk groups. Garantido and Caprichoso were not invited, and there was no contest between them.

In 1966, Garantido and Caprichoso participated in the festival for the first time. Their appearances were not yet organised as a regular title contest: the associations performed separately, reflecting concerns about confrontations between their supporters. This edition is counted as the first official edition of the festival, although it did not produce a champion under the method used in this article.

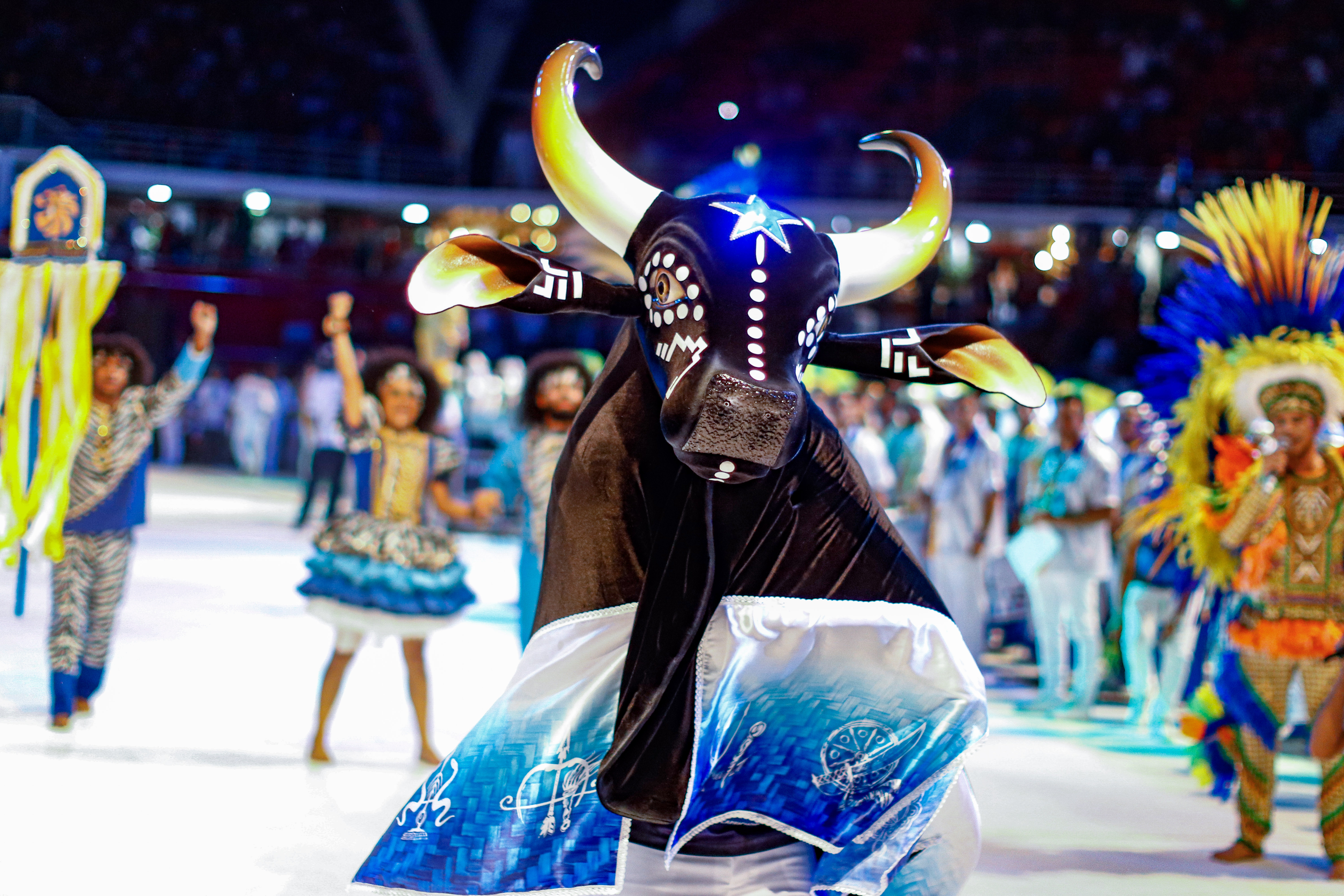
Boi Caprichoso, known as the touro negro ("black bull"), identified by its blue-and-white colours and the blue star on its forehead.

The first competitive encounter between the two associations occurred on 24 June 1967. After the two presentations, the master of ceremonies invited the audience to indicate, by applause, which performance it preferred. Caprichoso received the most applause and was considered the winner. However, the event was not yet an officially established contest, as there was no formal regulation, judging commission, or trophy. In 1968, the JAC introduced a prize for the winner, while the result continued to be determined by audience applause; Garantido won that year.

After three years in which the result had been determined by audience applause, the festival entered a new phase in 1970 with the introduction of a judging panel to evaluate the performances of the two bulls.

The last criterion continued to be determined by audience applause. Thus, public participation remained part of the competition, but applause was no longer the sole basis for determining the winner. For the first time, Caprichoso and Garantido were evaluated according to a set of formal judging criteria.

Over subsequent decades, the festival developed from a local June celebration into a major cultural event in Amazonas. The two bois became structured cultural associations, and their annual productions expanded in scale and complexity. They also appear at related local events, including Carnaboi, a carnival-period celebration in Parintins.

=== Boi Campineiro ===
Boi Campineiro is the third historic Boi-bumbá association of Parintins. It is traditionally associated with the colors green and yellow and is identified by a yellow sun on the forehead of its bull figure.

Campineiro became involved in the history of the Parintins competition on two exceptional occasions, although the circumstances of its participation were different.

1978: Campineiro was invited by Boi Garantido to take part in a dissident presentation organized at the grounds of the JAC , after Garantido declined to participate at the venue officially designated by the municipal government. Caprichoso had attended the official festival at the designated venue but later went to the dissident presentation after being invited. Following a hostile incident there, Caprichoso withdrew and did not return for the remaining nights. Campineiro subsequently took part in the remaining presentations at the dissident venue. In the reconstruction adopted here, however, Campineiro's participation in 1978 was not part of the official competition, and Caprichoso is credited with the championship by walkover (W.O.) because it had attended the officially designated festival while Garantido had not.

1983: Campineiro was officially invited by the municipal government to participate in the competition after Boi Caprichoso withdrew from that year's festival amid disputes concerning the organization of the event. Campineiro competed against Garantido in the municipalized arena and was recorded as the runner-up, while Garantido was declared champion. Unlike 1978, Campineiro's participation in 1983 was part of the official municipal competition.

Campineiro historically had considerably fewer financial and organizational resources than Parintins' two principal Boi-bumbá associations, Boi Caprichoso and Boi Garantido, and consequently remained primarily a community-based folkloric organization.

In recognition of its historical importance to Parintins' folkloric tradition, Boi Campineiro participated in a special presentation at the Bumbódromo during the second night of the 2024 Parintins Folklore Festival. The presentation was led by João Paulo Faria, the Amo do Boi of Garantido.

== Results and themes ==
The table distinguishes the festival's numbered editions from the allocation of titles.

Edition	Year	Champion		Runner-up	
I	1966	Garantido and Caprichoso participated, but no title was awarded.			
II	1967	★	Caprichoso	❤︎	Garantido
III	1968	❤︎	Garantido	★	Caprichoso
IV	1969	★	Caprichoso	❤︎	Garantido
V	1970	❤︎	Garantido	★	Caprichoso
VI	1971	❤︎	Garantido	★	Caprichoso
VII	1972	★	Caprichoso	❤︎	Garantido
VIII	1973	❤︎	Garantido	★	Caprichoso
IX	1974	★	Caprichoso	❤︎	Garantido
X	1975	❤︎	Garantido	★	Caprichoso
XI	1976	★	Caprichoso	❤︎	Garantido
XII	1977	★	Caprichoso	❤︎	Garantido
XIII	1978	★	Caprichoso W.O.		
XIV	1979	★	Caprichoso	❤︎	Garantido
XV	1980	❤︎	Garantido	★	Caprichoso
XVI	1981	❤︎	Garantido	★	Caprichoso
XVII	1982	❤︎	Garantido	★	Caprichoso
XVIII	1983	❤︎	Garantido	☀	Campineiro
XIX	1984	❤︎	Garantido	★	Caprichoso; The Infinite
XX	1985	★	Caprichoso; The Magnificent Black Bull	❤︎	Garantido
XXI	1986	❤︎	Garantido; Garantido and You: A Friendship No One Can Break	★	Caprichoso; Art, Love and Peace
XXII	1987	★	Caprichoso; A Revolution in the Art of the World	❤︎	Garantido
XXIII	1988	❤︎	Garantido; St. John's Folk Play	★	Caprichoso; Black King: A Tribute to Freedom
XXIV	1989	❤︎	Garantido; The Eternal Champion	★	Caprichoso; The Force of Nature
XXV	1990	★	Caprichoso; The Roots of a People	❤︎	Garantido; Garantido: Love, Island Magic
XXVI	1991	❤︎	Garantido; A Cabocla Origin	★	Caprichoso; Cabocla Culture
XXVII	1992	★	Caprichoso; The Art of Folklore	❤︎	Garantido; St. John's Folk Festival
XXVIII	1993	❤︎	Garantido; Amazon River, This River Is My Life	★	Caprichoso; In the Silence of the Forest
XXIX	1994	★	Caprichoso; The Gods’ Caprice	❤︎	Garantido; Temple of Eternal Legends
XXX	1995	★	Caprichoso; Light and Mysteries of the Forest	❤︎	Garantido; A Journey to the Amazon
XXXI	1996	★	Caprichoso; Cabocla Creation	❤︎	Garantido; Legends, Rituals and Dreams
XXXII	1997	❤︎	Garantido; Parintins for the World to See	★	Caprichoso; The Parintins Bull'
XXXIII	1998	★	Caprichoso; 85 Years of Culture	❤︎	Garantido; 500 Years of the Past to Build the Future
XXXIV	1999	❤︎	Garantido; Myth, Culture and Art	★	Caprichoso; Make Art Your Story
XXXV	2000	❤︎	Garantido; My St. John's Folk Play'	Draw	
XXXV	2000	★	Caprichoso; The Earth Is Blue	Draw	
XXXVI	2001	❤︎	Garantido; Living Amazon	★	Caprichoso; Love and Passion
XXXVII	2002	❤︎	Garantido; The Bull of the Amazon	★	Caprichoso; Cabocla Amazon with an Indigenous Soul
XXXVIII	2003	★	Caprichoso; 90 Years of Roots and Traditions in the Amazon	❤︎	Garantido; Amazon, Emerald Sanctuary
XXXIX	2004	❤︎	Garantido; Amazon, Brazilian Heart	★	Caprichoso; Amazonas: Land of Folklore, Source of Life
XL	2005	❤︎	Garantido; Festival of Nature	★	Caprichoso; The Star of Brazil
XLI	2006	❤︎	Garantido; Earth, the Great Maloca	★	Caprichoso; Amazon, Sacred Ground
XLII	2007	★	Caprichoso; El Dorado Is Here	❤︎	Garantido; Guardians of the Amazon
XLIII	2008	★	Caprichoso; The Future Is Now	❤︎	Garantido; The Bull of Preservation
XLIV	2009	❤︎	Garantido; Emotion	★	Caprichoso; Amazonas, Where Green Meets Blue
XLV	2010	★	Caprichoso; The Song of the Forest	❤︎	Garantido; Passion
XLVI	2011	❤︎	Garantido; Miscegenation	★	Caprichoso; The Enchanting Magic
XLVII	2012	★	Caprichoso; Long Live Popular Culture!	❤︎	Garantido; Tradition
XLVIII	2013	❤︎	Garantido; The Centennial Bull	★	Caprichoso; The Centennial of a Passion
XLIX	2014	❤︎	Garantido; Faith	★	Caprichoso; Amazon, Táwapayêra
L	2015	★	Caprichoso; Amazon	❤︎	Garantido; Life
LI	2016	❤︎	Garantido; Celebration	★	Caprichoso; Long Live Parintins!
LII	2017	★	Caprichoso; The Poetics of the Caboclo Imagination	❤︎	Garantido; Magic and Fascination in the Heart of the Amazon
LIII	2018	★	Caprichoso; Popular Wisdom: An Ancestral Revolution	❤︎	Garantido; The Pageant of Cultural Resistance
LIV	2019	❤︎	Garantido; We, the People!	★	Caprichoso; A Song of Hope for Mátria Brasilis
	2020	No festival was held in 2020 and 2021 due to the COVID-19 pandemic			
	2021	No festival was held in 2020 and 2021 due to the COVID-19 pandemic			
LV	2022	★	Caprichoso; Amazon: Our Struggle in Poetry	❤︎	Garantido; Amazon of the Red People
LVI	2023	★	Caprichoso; The Cry of the Warrior People	❤︎	Garantido; Garantido for Life
LVII	2024	★	Caprichoso; Culture – The Triumph of the People	❤︎	Garantido; Secrets of the Heart
LVIII	2025	❤︎	Garantido; The People's Bull, the Common People's Bull	★	Caprichoso; It Is Time for Retaking
LIX	2026	★	Caprichoso; The Folk Play That Sings of Its Homeland	❤︎	Garantido; Parintins: Gateway to Enchantment

== Statistics ==
=== Titles by association ===
Boi-bumbá		Titles	Runner-up finishes	Draws	Appearances in official title contests
Gold medal	Boi Garantido	30	28	1	57
Silver medal	Boi Caprichoso	29	28	1	57
Bronze medal	Boi Campineiro	0	1	0	1

These figures count 1966 as the first official edition but not as a title contest. They include the joint championship in 2000.

=== Consecutive championships ===
Titles	Boi-bumbá	Years
5	Boi Garantido	1980, 1981, 1982, 1983 and 1984
4	Boi Caprichoso	1976, 1977, 1978 and 1979
4	Boi Garantido	1999, 2000, 2001 and 2002
3	Boi Garantido	2004, 2005 and 2006
3	Boi Caprichoso	1994, 1995 and 1996
3	Boi Caprichoso	2022, 2023 and 2024
2	Boi Garantido	1970 and 1971
2	Boi Garantido	1988 and 1989
2	Boi Garantido	2013 and 2014
2	Boi Caprichoso	2007 and 2008
2	Boi Caprichoso	2017 and 2018

=== Champions by decade ===
Decade	Champions by association
1960s	Boi Caprichoso (2); Boi Garantido (1)
1970s	Boi Caprichoso (6); Boi Garantido (4)
1980s	Boi Garantido (8); Boi Caprichoso (2)
1990s	Boi Caprichoso (6); Boi Garantido (4)
2000s	Boi Garantido (7); Boi Caprichoso (4)
2010s	Boi Garantido (5); Boi Caprichoso (5)
2020s	Boi Caprichoso (4); Boi Garantido (1)

== Gallery of images ==
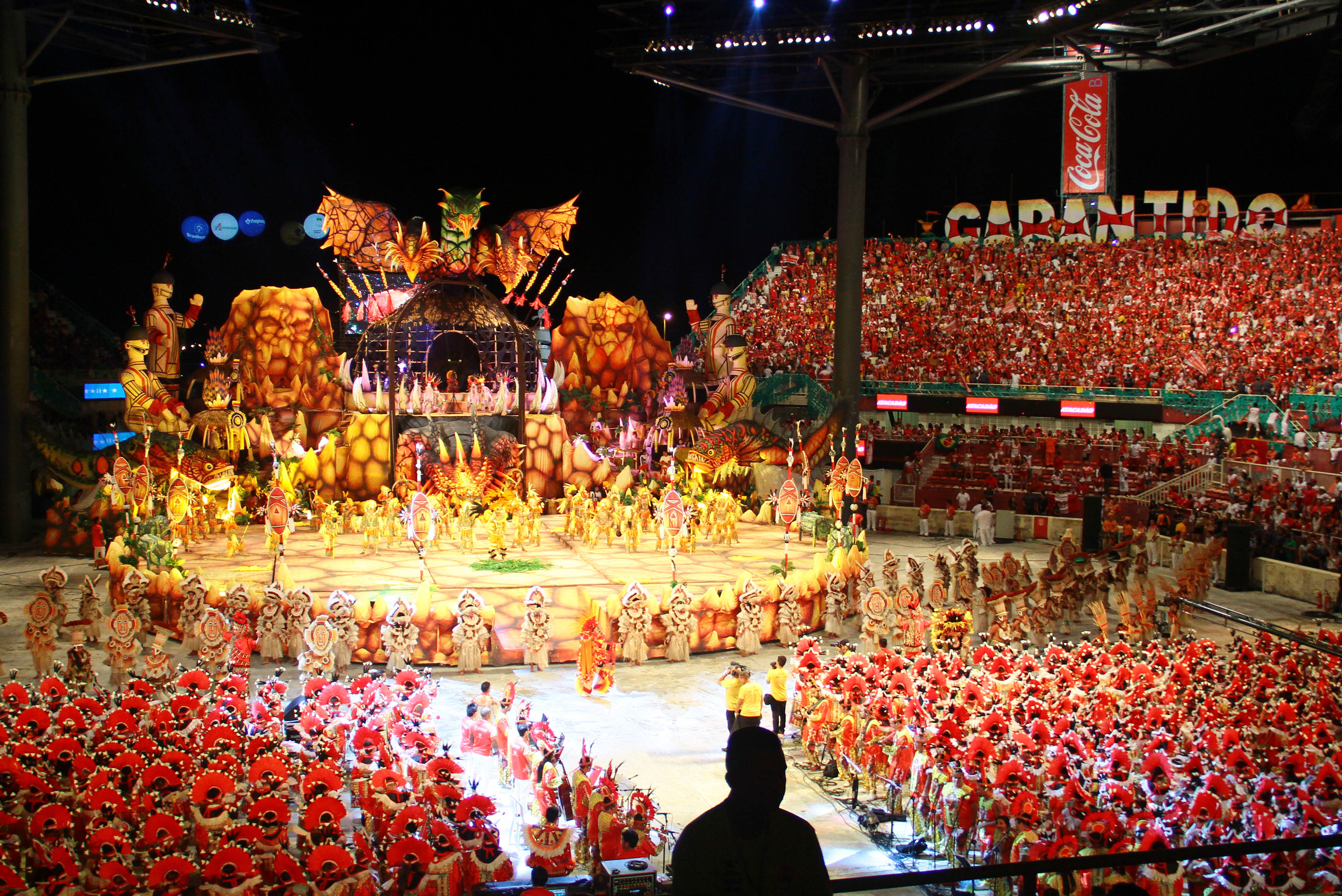
Presentation of Boi Garantido (Red) in Parintins Folklore Festival of 2016.

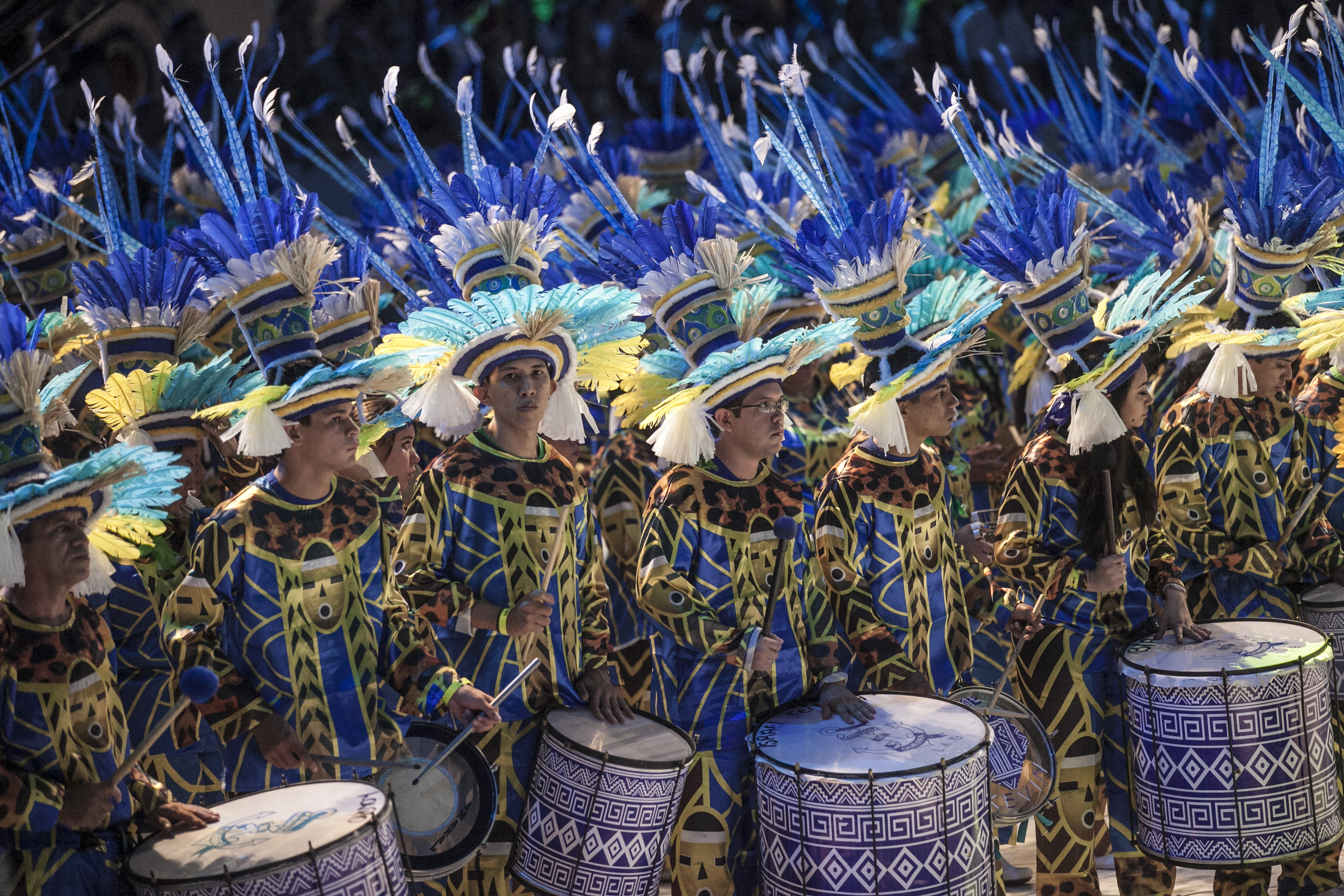
Presentation of Boi Caprichoso (Blue) in Parintins Folklore Festival of 2015.

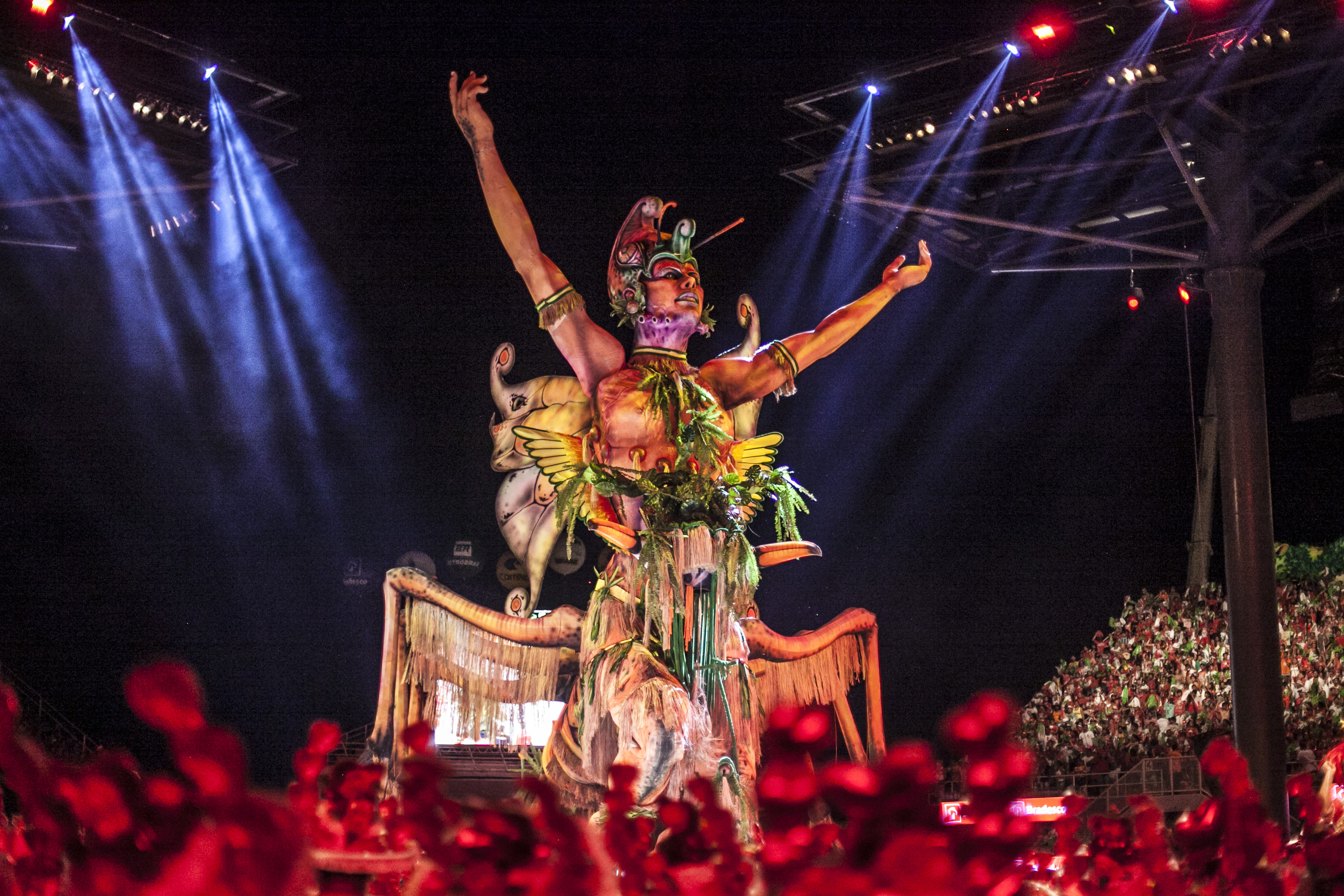
The festival stands out in the Brazil, by following a similar model to Carnival, showing sometimes the handcraft indigenous culture of the Amazon or showing of the culture of other parts of country.

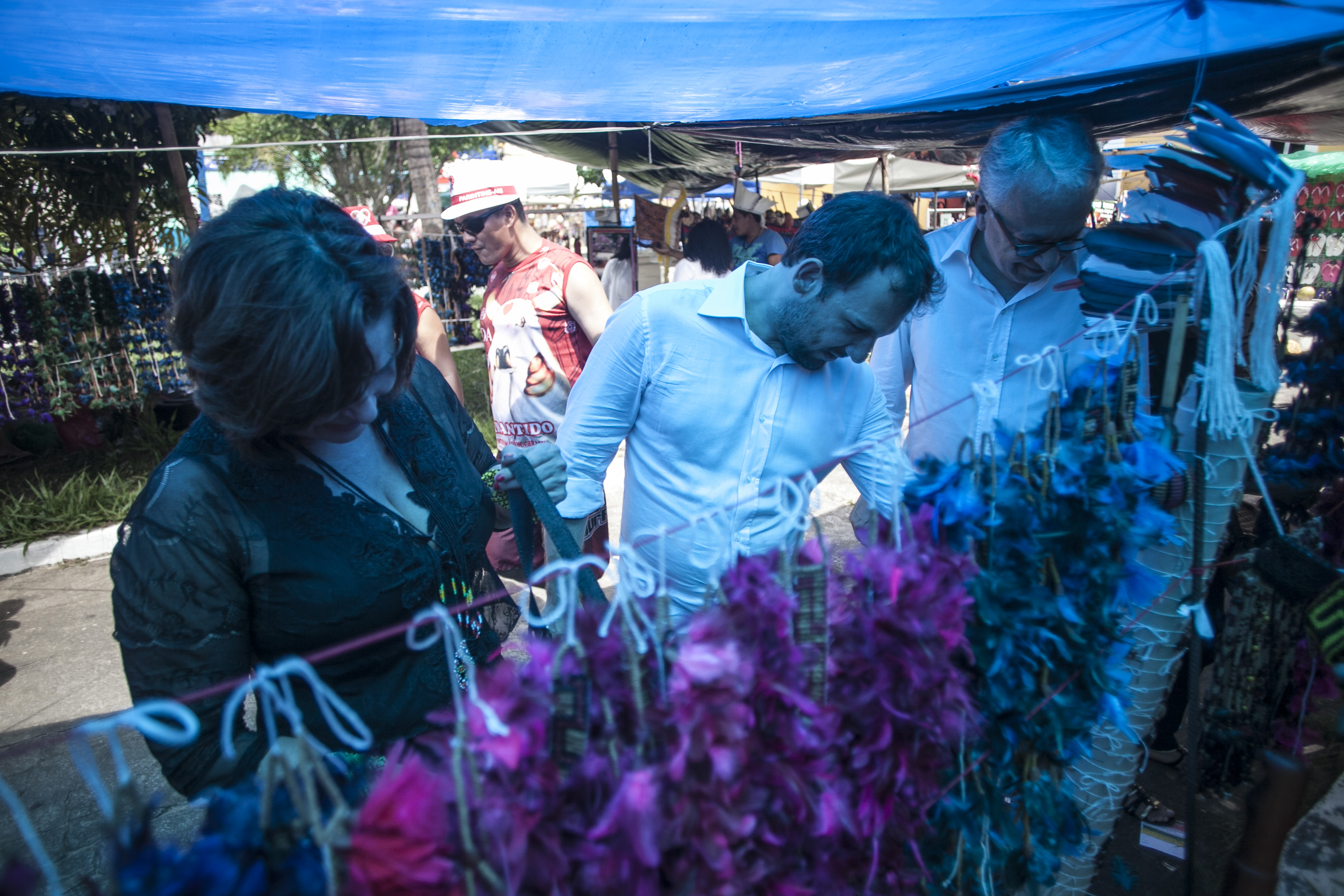
Indigenous handicraft that takes place during the festival.

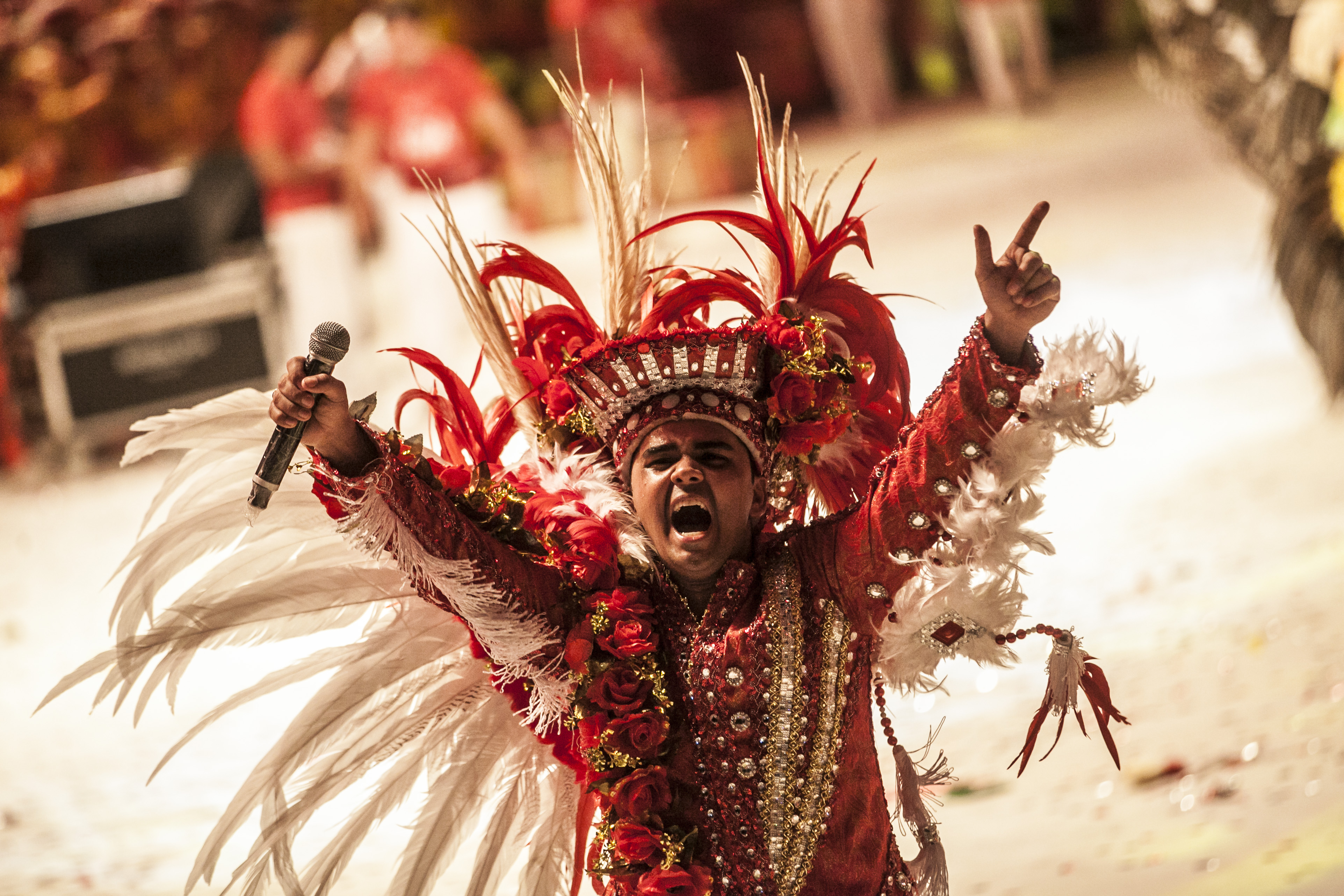
Israel Paulain, presenter of the Boi Garantido since 2002

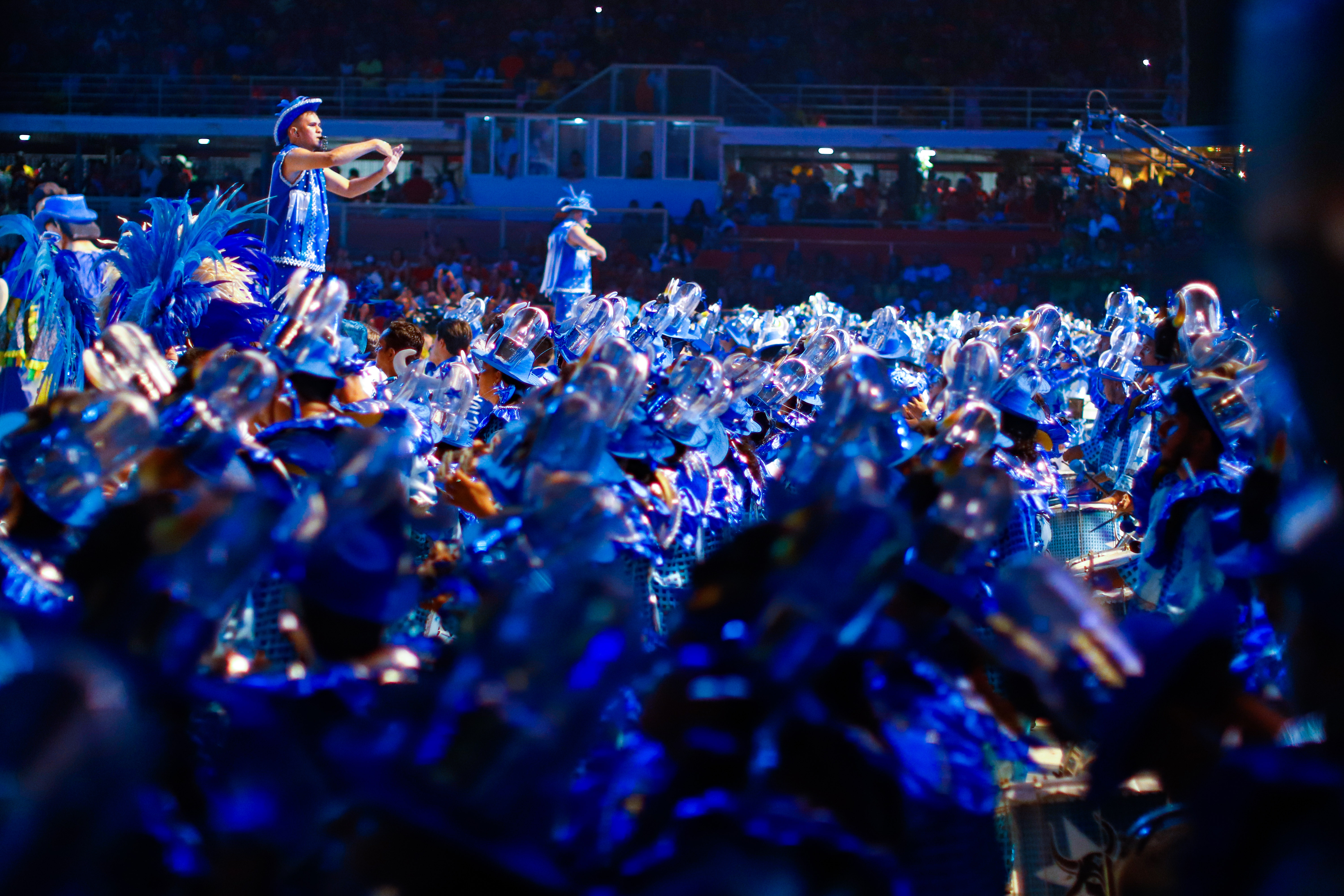
The marujada de guerra of the Boi Caprichoso, which is the group of players who provide the percussion accompaniment to the songs (toadas), is the basis for the show

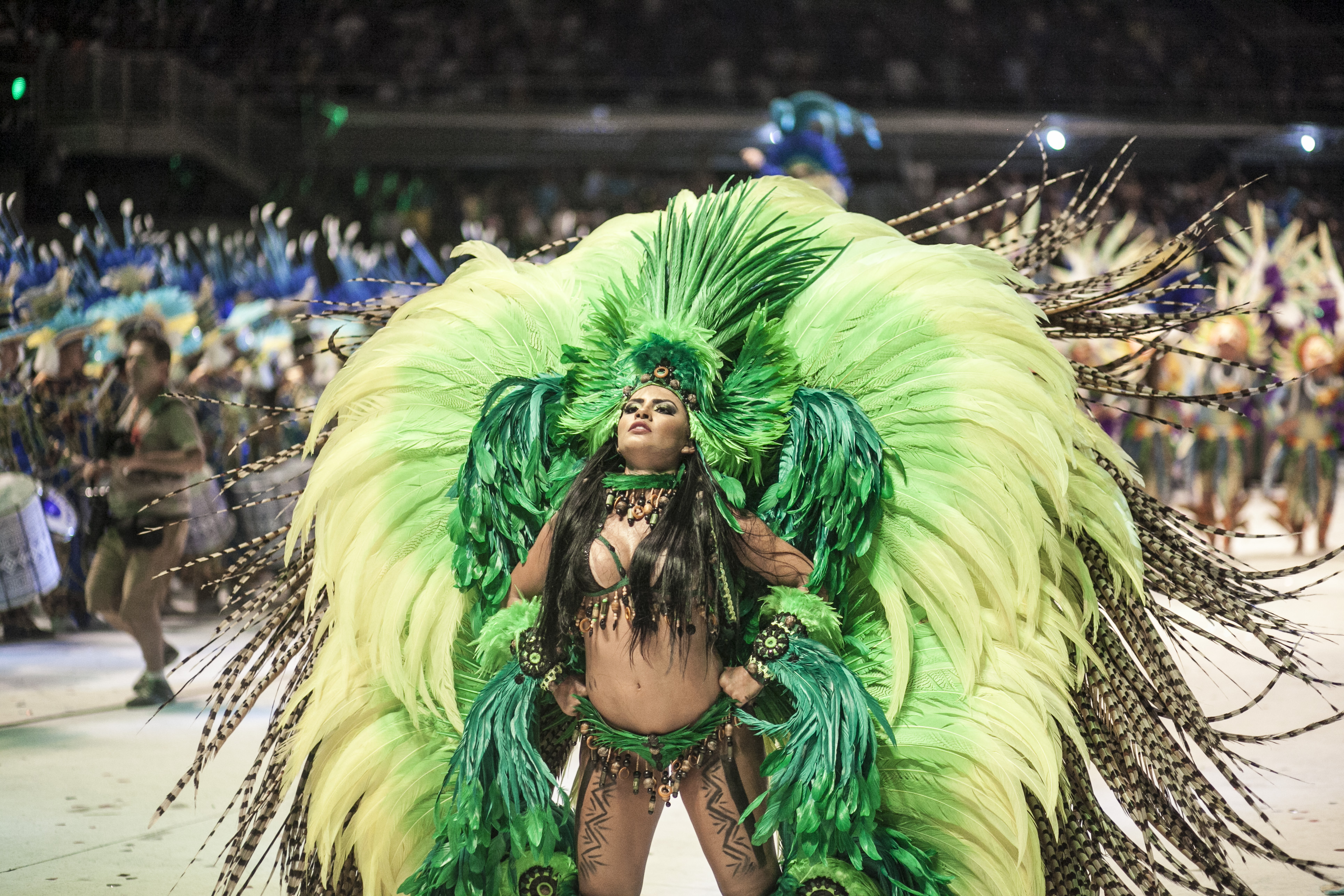
Maria Azêdo was the cunhã poranga of the Boi Caprichoso from 2007 to 2018. Cunhã poranga, a term in the Nheengatu language that means "beautiful woman", represents the indigenous people.

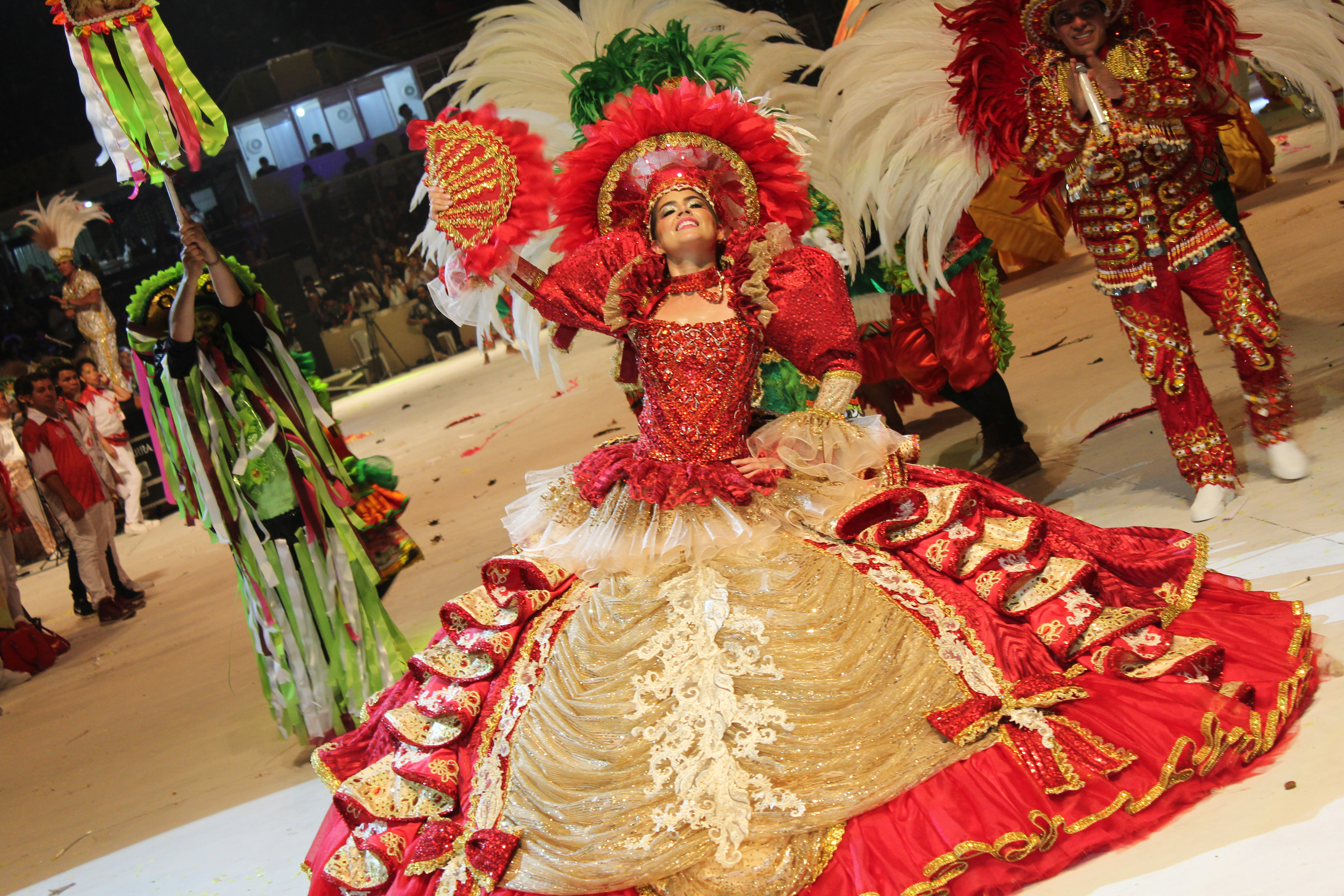
Sinhazinha da fazenda of the Boi Garantido. The sinhazinha da fazenda represents the daughter of the farm owner in the traditional Bumba Meu Boi.

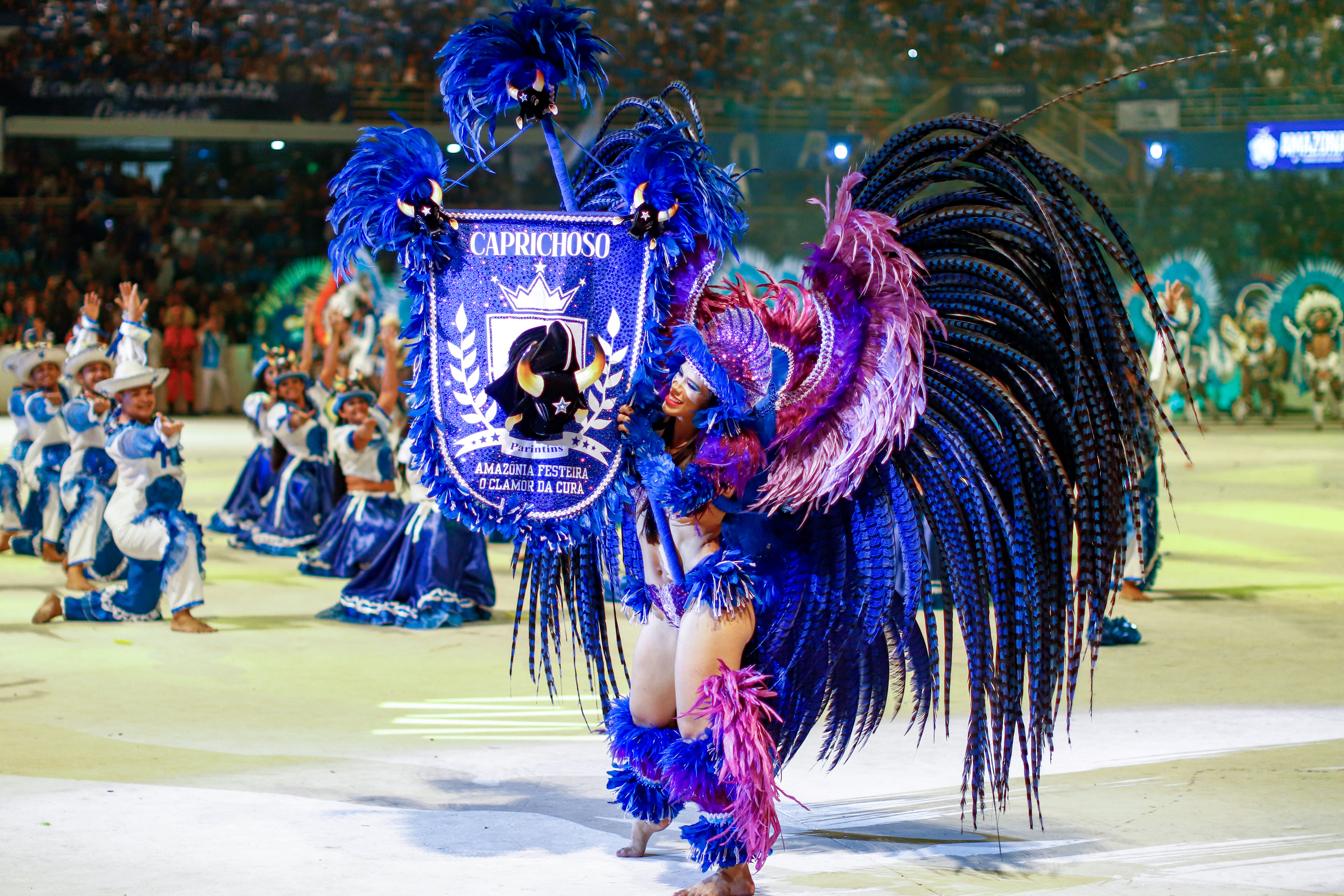
The porta-estandarte (standard-bearer) of the Boi Caprichoso

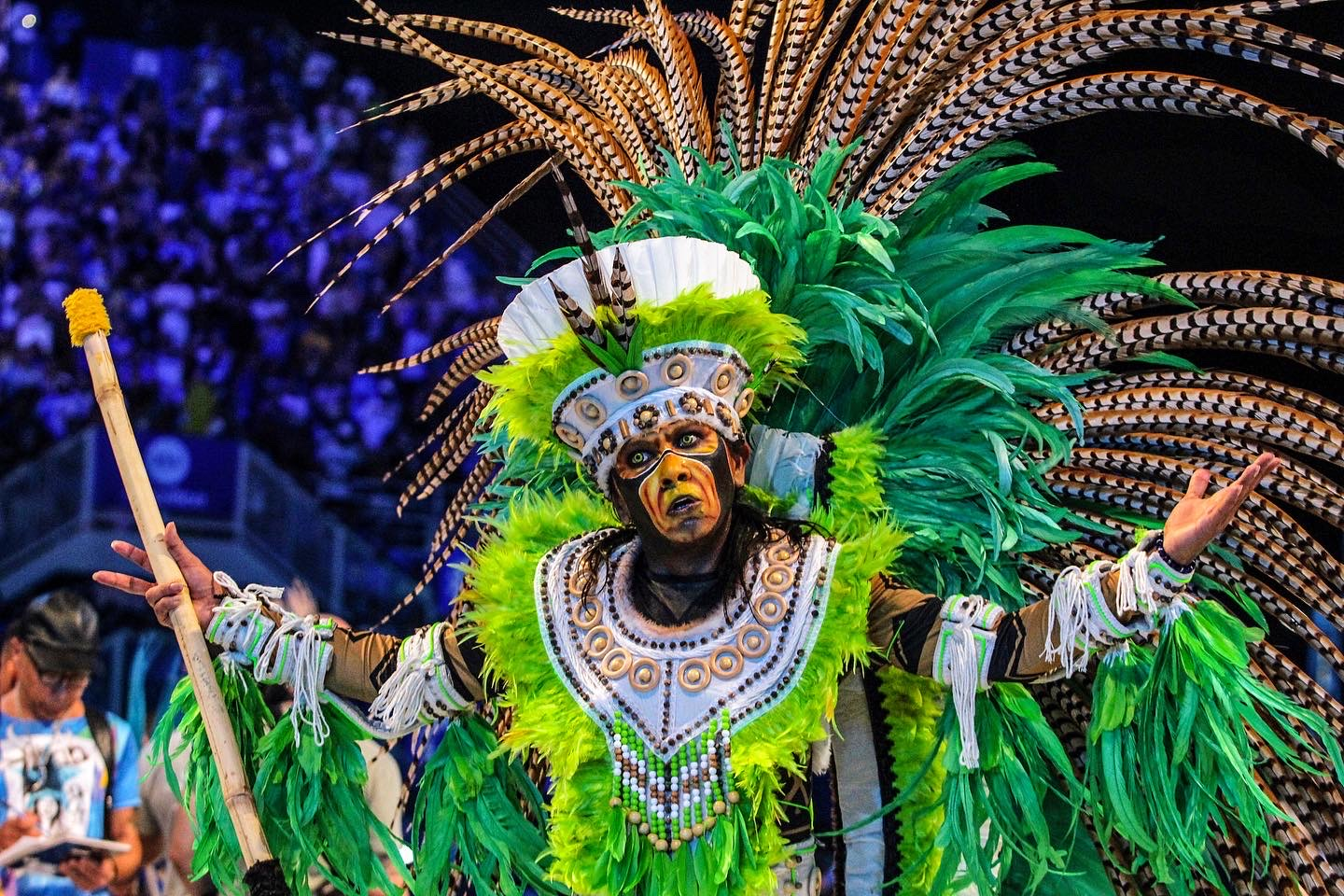
The pajé (shaman) of the Boi Caprichoso

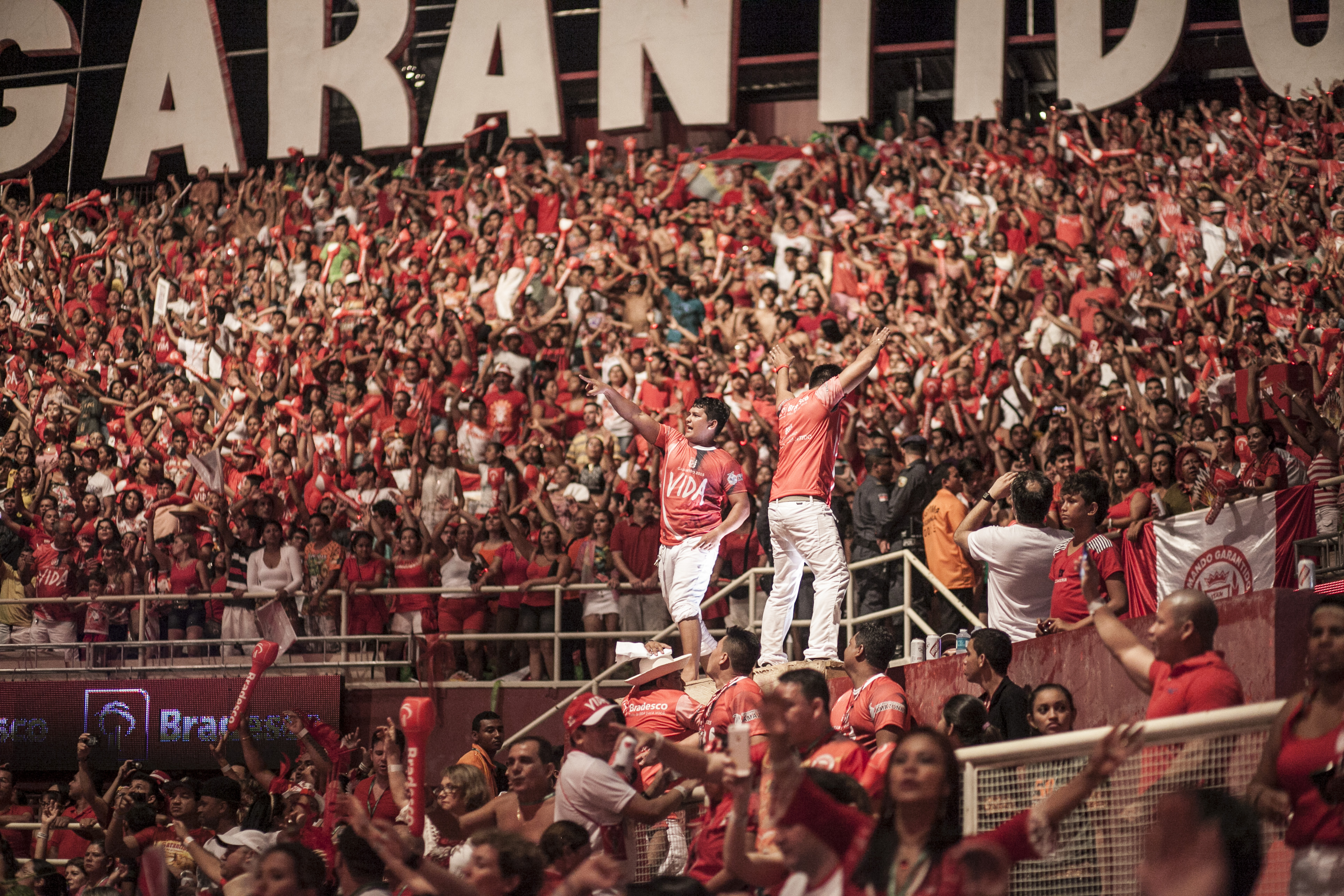
Boi Garantido fans

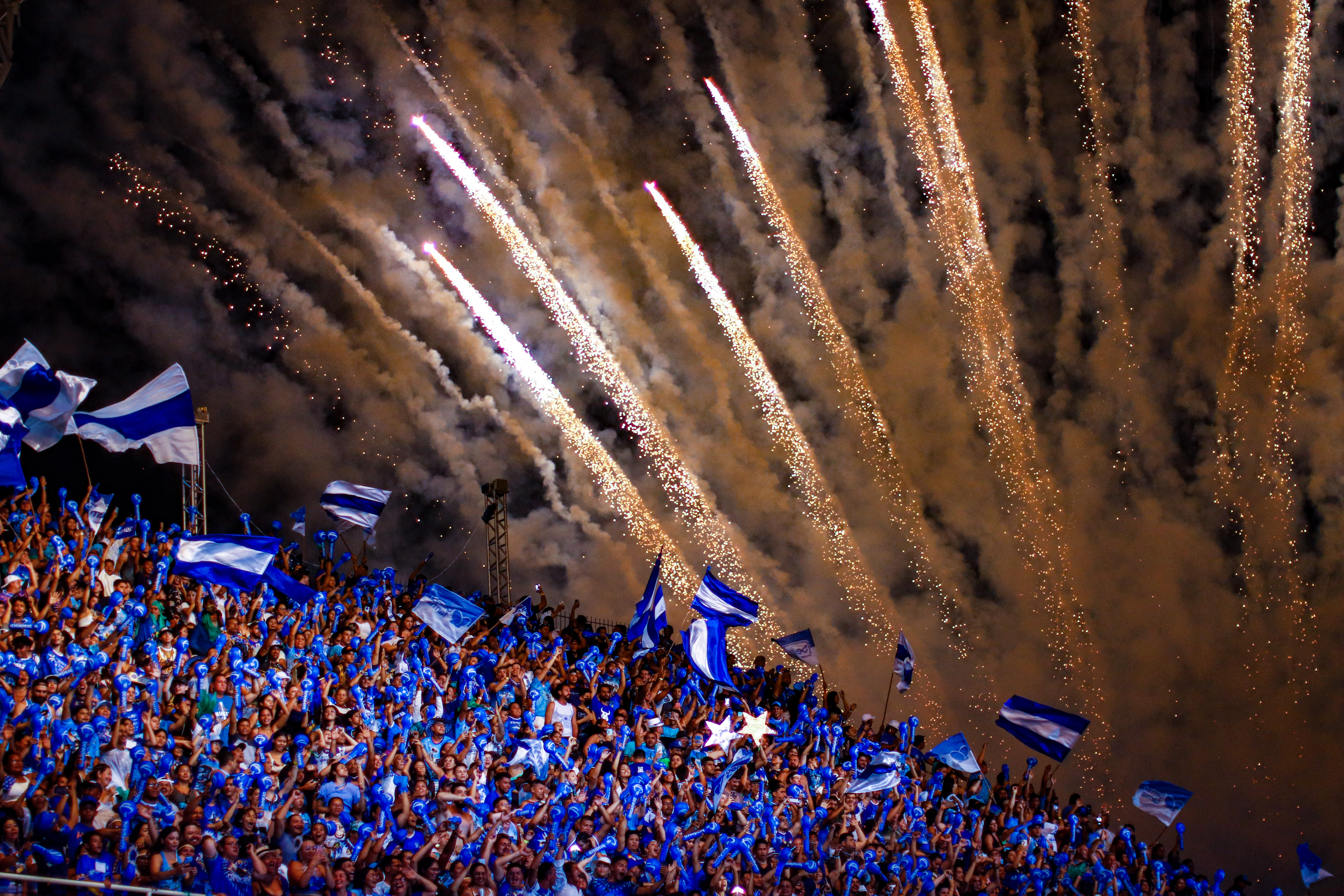
Boi Caprichoso fans

== See also ==
- Festa Junina
- Bumba Meu Boi
