= Bumba Meu Boi =

Interactive play celebrated in Brazil

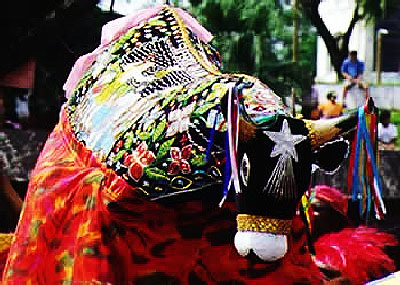
- Interactive dance/festival
- Native name: Bumba Meu Boi
- English name: Bumba Meu Boi
- Date: June 13–29 and December 25 – January 6
- Duration: Mid-18th century – Present
- Location: All regions of Brazil
- Theme: The death and resurrection of an ox
- Participants: The people of Brazil

Bumba Meu Boi is an interactive play celebrated in Brazil. It originated in the 18th century. It is a form of social criticism. Lower-class Brazilians mock and criticize those of higher social status through a comedic folklore story told in song and dance. Though not as well known internationally as Carnival and other Brazilian festivals, it is older and deeply rooted in the culture of Brazil. The tale can vary depending on the region and social setting in which it is practiced. However, its essential theme remains the same, with a focus on the death and resurrection of an ox.

The principal figures include an ox, a white master (Cavalo Marinho, in Pernambuco), a black pregnant woman (Catirina), a Vaqueiro or cowboy (Mateus, Chico or Pai Francisco), other vaqueiros (cowboys), índios, índias and caboclos (indigenous people), a priest, and a doctor (or indigenous healers, pajés). The audience is also a key component of the performance, as passionate responses from spectators provide a hectic atmosphere. Additionally, performers are known to become playfully physical with the audience.

Today, Bumba Meu Boi is separated into traditional and modern practices. However, only the traditional forms can be found throughout the country. Both versions can be seen in Brazil from June 13 to 29, as well as from December 25 (Christmas) to January 6.

The Cultural Complex of Bumba-meu-boi from Maranhão was declared Intangible Cultural Heritage of Humanity by UNESCO in December 2019.

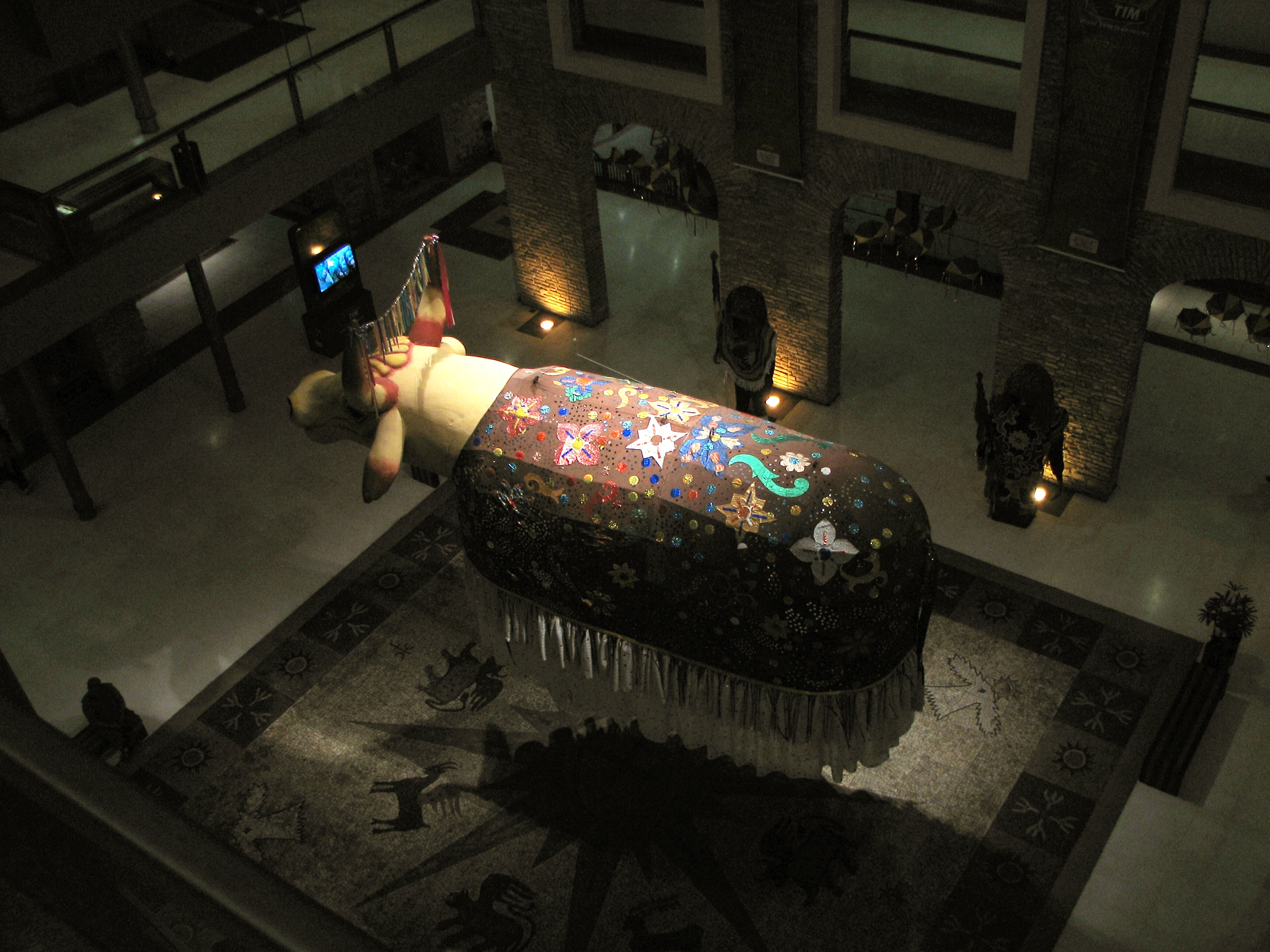
Giant Bumba-meu-boi in Recife

== History ==
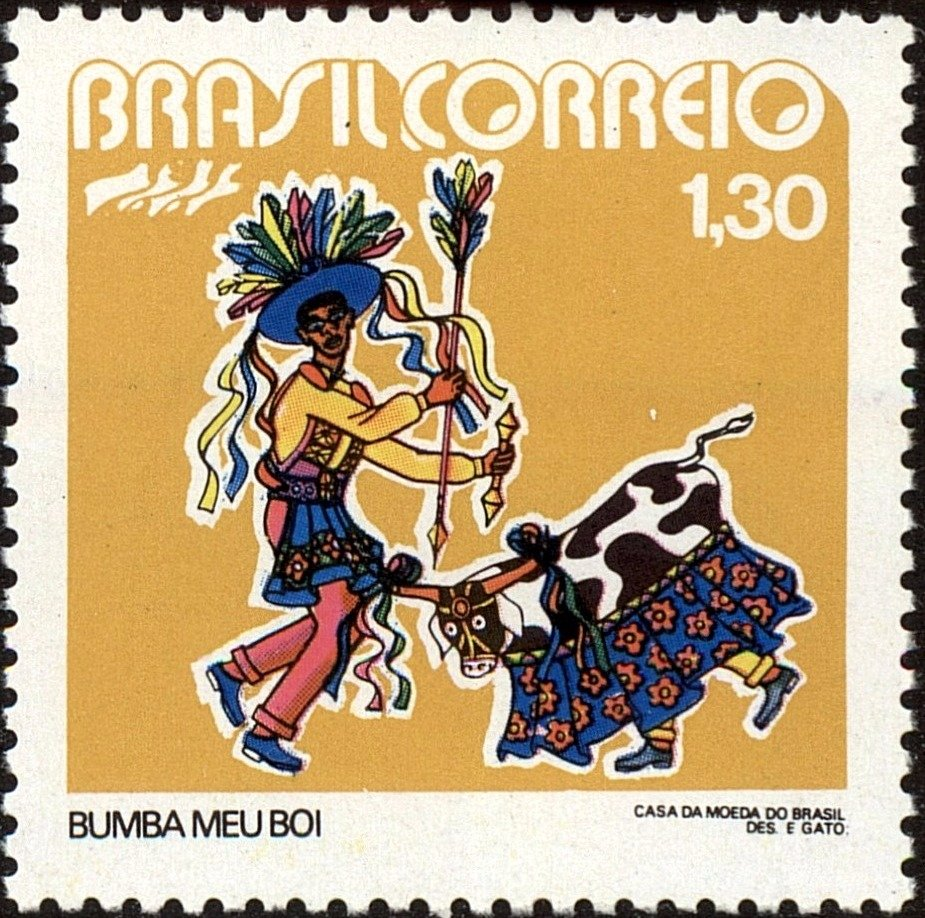
Illustration of Bumba Meu Boi on a stamp

Many different origins of Bumba Meu Boi have been proposed. However, the most commonly believed one is from mid-18th-century Brazil lower-class communities that were left very little from the wealthy and forced to live dreadful lives. It was through these rough conditions that Bumba Meu Boi was born to bring joy to these deprived communities, as well as to provide men with an internal form of rebellion. These communities consisted of slaves and rural workers. So from the start, Bumba Meu Boi was created from people of mixed origins. This is significant because it cuts the festival from any racial ties.

As it became more popular throughout northeastern communities in the 21st century, people began performing it for the entertainment of others, rather than merely for self-enjoyment. It was at this point that it evolved from a family affair to a communal one. This also made it more important within lower-class Brazilians' social lives, as it brought everyone together. By the 20th century the play became an annual and biannual event, transitioning to its modern form as a festival. Throughout the 20th century and the turn of the 21st century, the festival experienced large amounts of popularization, spreading to all corners of the nation. This created large variations of the festival to form, depending on the central values of each community it is celebrated in. Today, its variations and the Brazilians who celebrate them can be sorted into two main categories of people. There are those who continue to celebrate the festival in its traditional forms, who mainly live in northern, northeastern, and Amazonian cities and villages, especially in Maranhão, though it also exists in central regions as well. These forms of the festival still maintain a large focus on the rebellious features of the play towards the upper class, providing Brazil's lower class with a strong cultural connection to Brazil's past. Then there are those who embrace its modern form, which is more constantly altering to modern trends and is aroused by the media. These forms of the festival allow Brazilians to embrace the more current, festive cultures of Brazil. Rationally, this form exists in more populated, modernized cities such as Rio de Janeiro, and is perceived by traditionalists to have lost the meaning of the celebration.

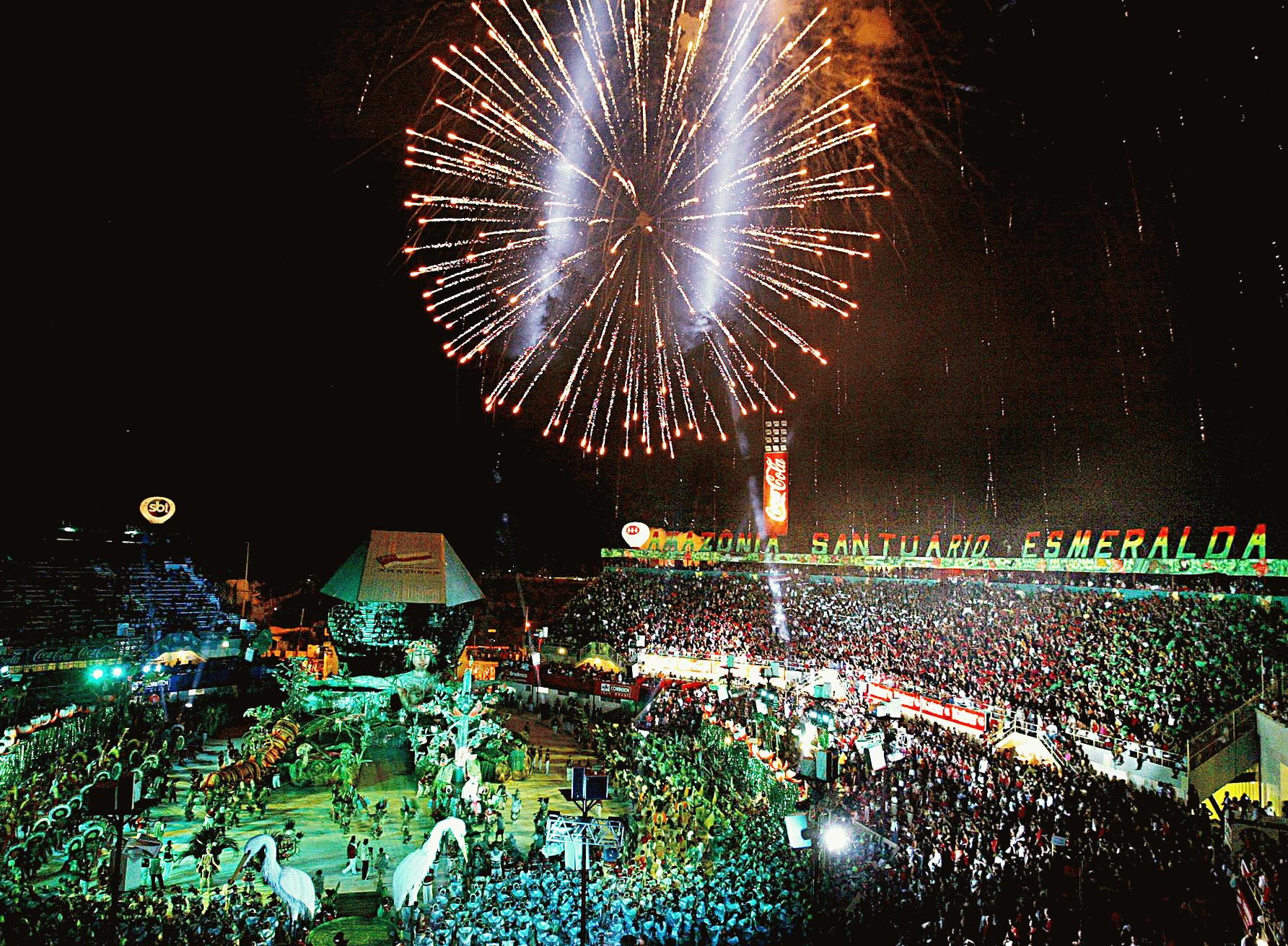
The Parintins Festival in June 2003

The ox was placed as a centerpiece because, at the time, it was seen as an animal of high economic regard due to its use in farming. Oxen were also highly involved in colonists' social lives, as bullfighting and calf-dancing were very popular. These are thought to have been passed down from lower-class Portuguese families, as similar social activities can be traced back much further in Portugal.

A literal translation for "bumba my ox" could be "dance my ox".

== Bumba meu boi in Maranhão ==
Cultural Complex of Bumba-meu-boi from Maranhão
- UNESCO Intangible Cultural Heritage
- Country: Brazil
- Reference: 01510
- Region: Latin America and the Caribbean

Inscription history
- Inscription: 2019 (14th session)
- List: Representative

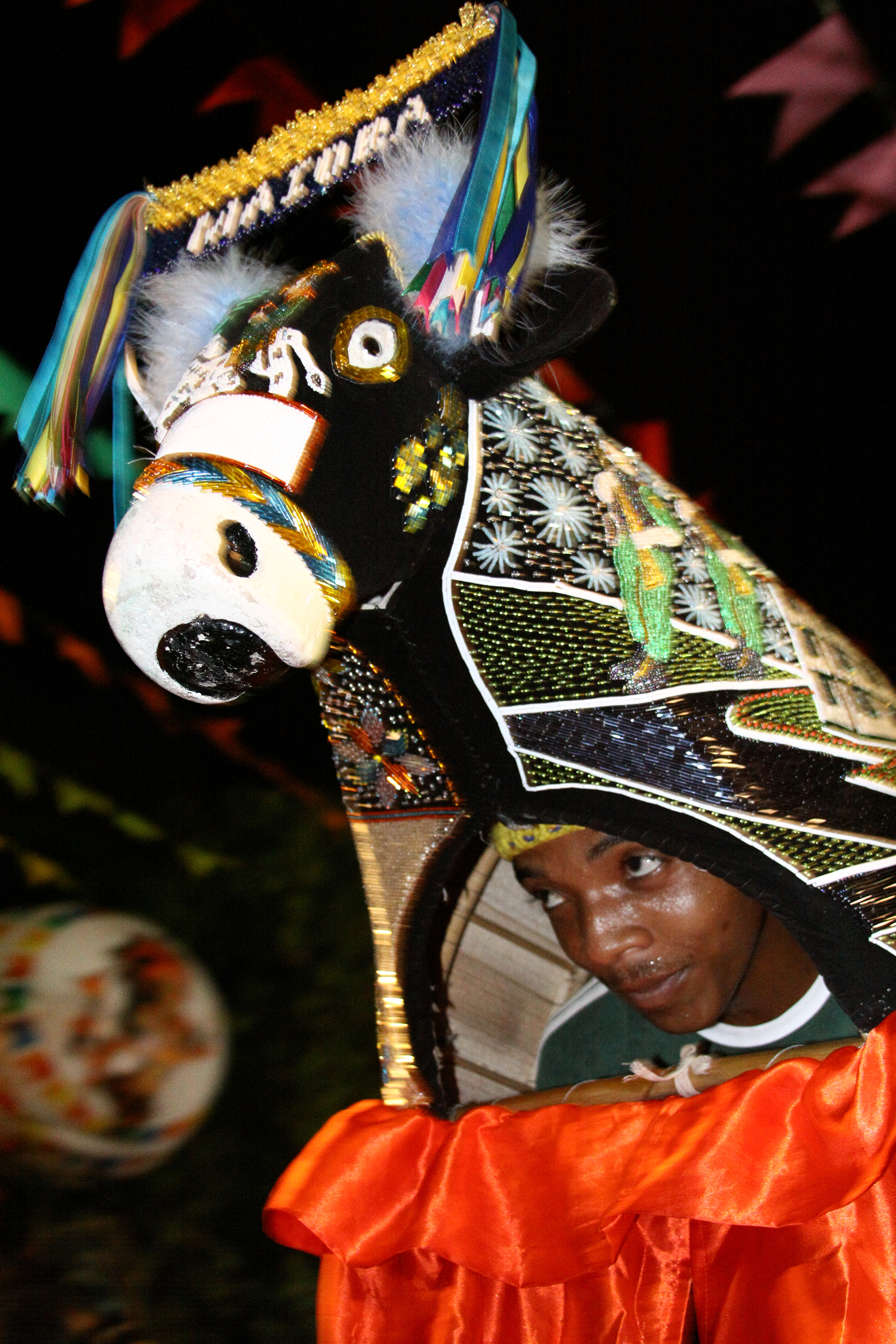
"Miolo do boi", man responsible for the evolutions and choreography of the ox, in Maranhão. This is the miolo of Boi da Maioba (Ox of Maioba)

There are almost one hundred bumba-meu-boi groups in the state of Maranhão, Brazil, subdivided in several sotaque. Each sotaque (which means "accent") has its own characteristics that are manifested in clothes, in the choice of instruments, in the type of cadence of music and in choreographies. The sotaques are: matraca, zabumba, orquestra, from the Baixada Maranhense, and costa de mão, that appear especially in the month of June, in the Festas Juninas, in places called Arraiais.

It involves several characters, such as the owner of the farm (amo or master), Pai Francisco (vaqueiro, a cowboy, or a slave), his wife Catirina, cowboys (vaqueiros), índios, índias and caboclos (indigenous people), the ox, and cazumbás (a mischievous being that represents the overall spirit of Bumba Meu Boi). The plot recalls a typical history of the region's social and economic relations during the colonial period, marked by monoculture, extensive cattle breeding and slavery, mixing European, African and indigenous cultures.

The most famous groups of Maranhão are: Boi de Maracanã, Boi da Maioba and Boi da Pindoba (sotaque of matraca); Boi de São Simão, Boi de Nina Rodrigues, Boi de Axixá, Boi de Morros, Boi de Rosário, Boi Brilho da Ilha and Boi Novilho Branco (sotaque of orquestra); Boi de Leonardo, Boi de Vila Passos, Boi da Fé em Deus, Boi Unidos Venceremos and Boi de Guimarães (sotaque of zabumba). Boi União da Baixada, Boi de Pindaré, Boi Unidos de Santa Fé and Boi Penalva do Bairro de Fátima (sotaque of Baixada); Boi Rama Santa, Boi Brilho da Sociedade, Boi Soledade and Boi Brilho da Areia Branca (sotaque costa de mão).

The bumba-meu-boi involves the devotion to the saints of June São João, São Pedro and São Marçal, and is the most important manifestation of popular culture in the state, attracting thousands of people. The Feast of Saint Peter and Saint Marçal marks the end of the Festas Juninas. On the Feast of St. Peter (29/06), various groups of ox go to St. Peter's Chapel to thank the June season for blessings. On the feast of São Marçal (St. Martial, 30/06), there is a large batalhões of bumba meu boi of matraca (two small pieces of wood, beaten against each other, to produce the rhythm) in the neighborhood of João Paulo, in São Luís, capital of Maranhão.

Other typical dances of Maranhão are: Cacuriá and Tambor de Crioula. The present model of presentation of the bumba meu boi in Maranhão does not tell all the story of the 'auto', replaced by a simplified story, with greater emphasis on songs ("toadas") and dances.

== The story ==
Finding a single true plot behind the story of Bumba Meu Boi is near impossible due to all its variances throughout different communities in Brazil. However, the most common performance will go as follows: The Musical begins with the singing of the overture form the Chorus, who may sing a multitude of songs specifically for Bumba Meu Boi. Usually the first to walk into the room is Cavalo Marinho (or Amo, the owner of farm), wearing a costume that makes it appear as though he is riding a horse. He entertains the audience with rhythmic dancing until the Chorus announces of the entrance of important characters, such as a cowboy named Mateus (or Pai Francisco), who may have another cowboy with him named Birico. A pregnant woman named Catirina usually enters with the Cowboys. She is played by a man, which is almost always the same for all female roles in the performance. After a dance of their own, Catirina proclaims her need to consume the tongue of an ox or bull, for she fears her baby will die, or sometimes have certain birth defects if she doesn't. The story follows Mateus (or Pai Francisco) as he leaves to find an ox. He has many comedic encounters with secondary characters, such as a giant and a donkey. In other forms of the story, the ox belongs to the village and there is no journey to find it.

Next, the ox enters the room and the audience cheers, as it is the most beloved role. The ox may perform a number of dances, and often one known as "Lundu", which involved tap dancing. The ox is then killed, and the audience remorse's and even cries. Often the ox is killed because it attacks the cowboys, Catirina, and the audience, or it happens by accident. Songs are then sung, mourning the death of the ox, followed by Mateus cutting out the ox's tongue and offering it to Catirina. Next Cavalo Marinho (or Amo, the owner of the farm) re-enters and demands the capture of the one who killed the ox, as it is a useful animal to the farm. He also requests a doctor (or indigenous healers, the pajés, in Maranhão) to try to bring the ox back to life. Before doctors arrive, a priest arrives, to bless the ox and to simultaneously marry Mateus and Catirina. The story alters largely here; one or sometimes two doctors may come, to try a variety of comical procedures to save the ox. Witches are also known to come in some. All who attempt to save the ox are mocked by the audience. In Maranhão, when the indigenous healers (pajés) are summoned to save the ox, and when the ox resurrects mooing, they all participate in a huge feast to commemorate the miracle. In other forms a doctor places a special green leaf in the ox mouth. As the ox is revived, the audience cheer, sing songs of praise and dance around the ox. At some point in this final scene the Capitão do Mato or police arrives which is a man dress in a military outfit. He is then mocked by the Audience and by other characters in the play as well. Lastly the Farwell begins as the Chorus sings, and the performers dance, which can be well-mannered or offensive depending on the entertainers' opinion of the reactions of the audience to the performance.

== Character analysis ==
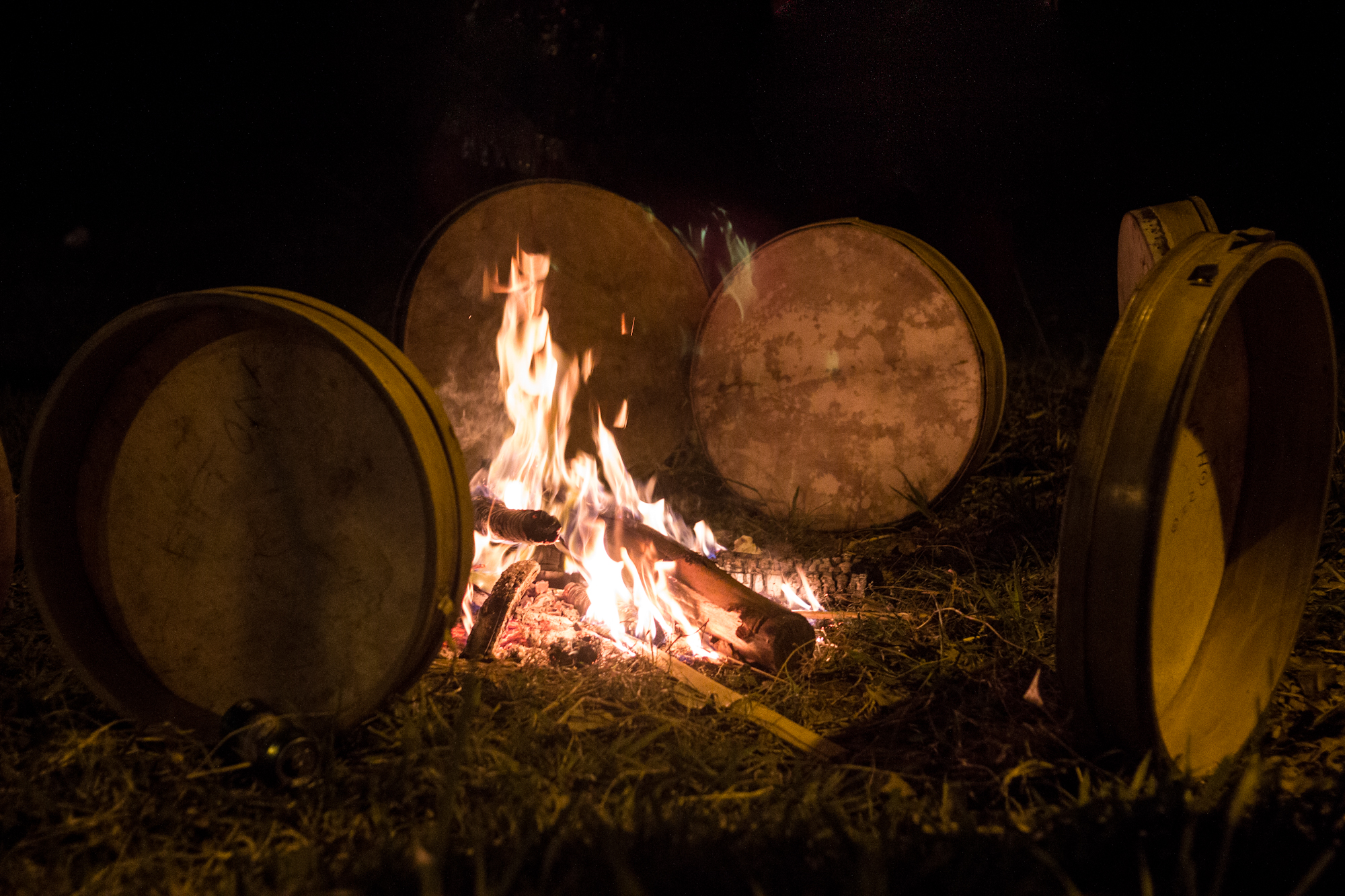
Drums being heated for presentations

The Band: Is typically positioned visually on the side of the stage or room, and is responsible for creating a beat for the performers to dance to. The band consists of String, air, and percussion. In Maranhão, there are also matracas, maracás, pandeirão, pandeiros and tambor onça and zabumbas (types of drum).

The Chorus: Is off-scene for all of the play and is responsible for the introduction of each character as they appear on-scene. Within the Chorus, the Violeiro, and Cantador are guitar players whose energy and speed of play is important to the atmosphere of the play. Additionally, they are responsible for the improvisation of new songs that go along with what is occurring in the musical, and the surrounding community.

Amo: in Maranhão, represents the role of the owner of the farm, commands the group with the aid of a whistle and a maracá (maracá of the master) sings the principal toadas (songs).

Cavalo Marinho: In Pernambuco, he is the main character with the highest authority in the play and the first to arrive on-scene. He is typically white, representing a Portuguese heritage, and wears a naval captain's costume, including a colored coat with golden ornaments hanging from it. Also, red striped pants, a red satin ribbon across his chest (sometimes), and a crown made of paper, covered with small mirrors and ribbons. Additionally, he is seen carrying a sword and has a protruding addition to his costume, making it appear as though he is riding a horse.

Vaqueiros (Cowboys): These characters consist of Mateus (or Pai Francisco, in Maranhão), and often Birico or Sebastião. There may also be other cowboys as well, however, they are insignificant. Their role in the play is as energetic jokesters, who obey the orders of Cavalo Marinho, and are meant to arouse the audience with laughter and remarkable dancing. The Vaqueiros tend to mainly mock the roles of authority in the play such as the Cavalo Marinho, Doctor, priest, and Capitão do Mato (police). Lastly, Mateus tends to be decorated with many noisy bells hanging from his clothes, and Birico will typically wear a mask, while both carry whips in hand.

Indios, Indias and caboclos (indigenous people): have a mission to locate and arrest Pai Francisco. In the presentation of the bumba meu boi of Maranhão, they provide a beautiful visual effect due to the beauty of their clothes and the choreography they perform. Some groups, especially the sotaque de matraca have the royal caboclo, or caboclo de pena (feather), which is the greatest outfit of bumba meu boi. Caboclos de fita are pessoas with hats with colorful ribbon and they blend into the cowboys during a party.

Catirina: As almost all female roles in Bumba Meu Boi, she is played by a man, as a black, provocative woman. She is also pregnant and the mistress of Pai Francisco/Mateus. She is also a comedic character, who is known to dance a frantic Samba. She is very significant in the story, as she is the one who requests the arrival of the bull for its tongue. Sometimes, a secondary female character comes out with Catirina, named Dona Joana. She is also a black woman played by a man, who normally wears amusing ornaments.

Pai Francisco, Chico or Mateus: Catirina's husband, vaqueiro (cowboy), dress in simpler clothes. His role is to provoke laughter in the audience.

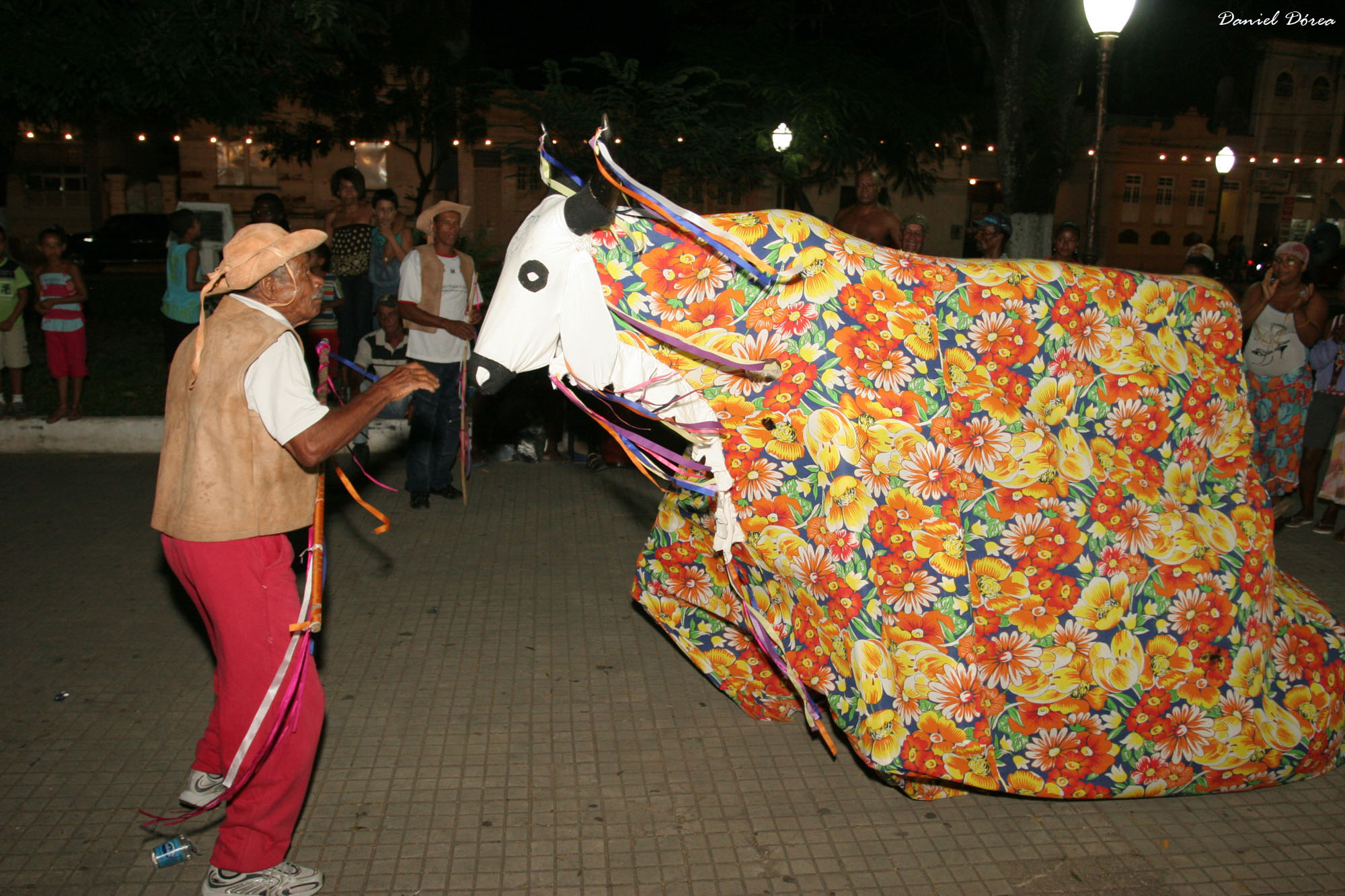
Typical costume for the bull character

The ox: one or two men under a structure usually made of bamboo, covered with colored fabric, such as velvet. The head can be an ox skull or a mask adorned with flowers, stars, and ribbons. The ox has the largest effect on the crowd, and its death and resurrection is the basic framework of the play. In Maranhão, it is called Miolo to the person responsible for the evolutions and choreographies of the ox.

Capitão do Mato: An aggressive man wearing a military costume, who represents the authorities or the police. He is heavily mocked by the audience.

Priest: Is played by a man wearing an elegant robe of sorts, usually with some type of religious symbol on it, such as a cross or Mary, the mother of Jesus. He Arrives on-scene to bless the dead bull, and the marry Mateus and Catirina. Like all characters of high social status, the Priest is heavily mocked and disrespected by the audience, and other comedic characters.

Doctor: Is typically played by a one or many men wearing a higher-class gown. His procedures to save the ox life are usually foolish and are all ridiculed by the crowd. In Maranhão, indigenous healers, the pajés, try to bring the ox back to life

In longer versions, where Mateus (or Chico or Pai Francisco) and Birico embark on a journey to find the ox, the secondary characters they stumble upon are usually two or three of the following:

Burrinha or Zabelinha: This is a role of an unattractive woman riding a donkey, who tends to please the audience with a fast tap dance. Though the dance is impressive the character is meant to look unorthodox.

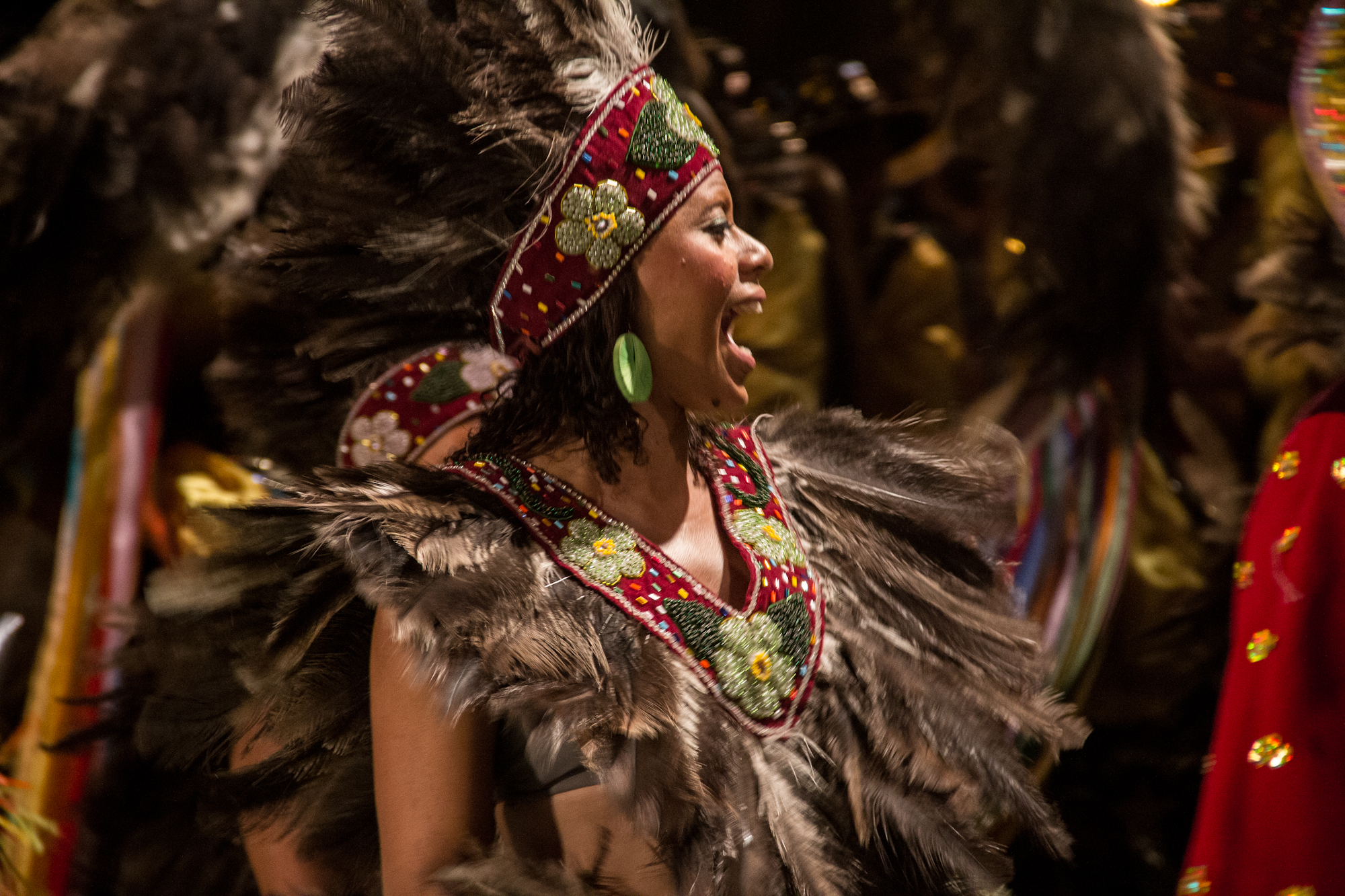
Woman dressed as índia of bumba meu boi.

Gigante: This is the role of a giant played by a man wearing a mask made from calabash, with a big mouth, nose, and eyes to represent a giant. He also wears a large cotton wig and rides on a horse (similar consume design as Cavalo Marinho). The role is known for it character's acrobatic dancing, music sounds like death screams, and forest sounds.

Caboclinha: A man plays an Amerindian girl wearing a costume made of feathers, and rides a goat. She will often skillfully dismount from the goat and kills it with an arrow.

Ema: An exotic bird, played by a boy weighed down by a straw basket full of trash, who moves like a bird, flapping his arms about frantically. He is meant to look foolish.

Babau: A truly dreadful animal played by a man under a sheet, clicking together the jaws of a horse.

Mutuca – in Maranhão, are responsible for the distribution of cachaça to all dancers not to sleep during the marathons of presentation of my bumba meu boi.

Cazumbá: in Maranhão, a character covered in green leaves, and wears a horrifying mask. Is called, or arrives uninvited to save the lifeless ox by performing witchcraft rituals.

== See also ==
- Boi (music)
- Parintins Folklore Festival
- Brazilian Carnival
